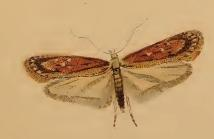

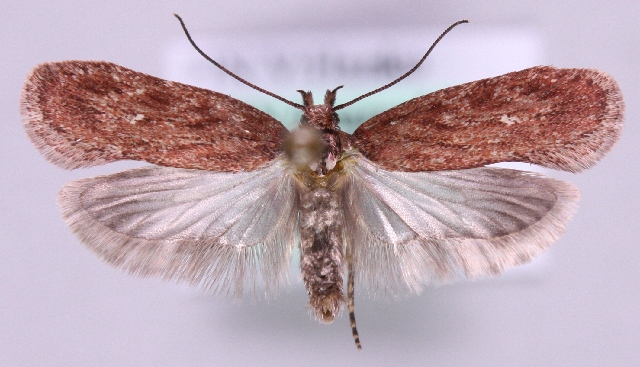

Scientific classification
- Domain: Eukaryota
- Kingdom: Animalia
- Phylum: Arthropoda
- Class: Insecta
- Order: Lepidoptera
- Family: Depressariidae
- Genus: Depressaria
- Species: D. olerella

Binomial name
- Depressaria olerella Zeller, 1854

= Depressaria olerella =

Species of moth

Depressaria olerella is a moth of the family Depressariidae. It is found in most of Europe, except Ireland, the Netherlands, the Iberian Peninsula and most of the Balkan Peninsula.

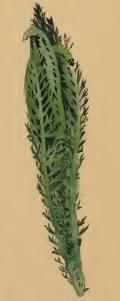
Leaves of Achillea millefolium drawn together by larva

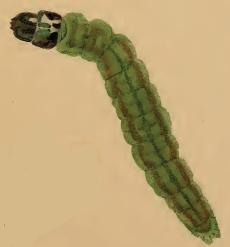
Larva

The wingspan is 20–23 mm. Adults are on wing from March to October.

The larvae feed on Achillea millefolium, Tanacetum vulgare, Tanacetum corymbosum and Senecio species. They live between leaves spun together with silk.
