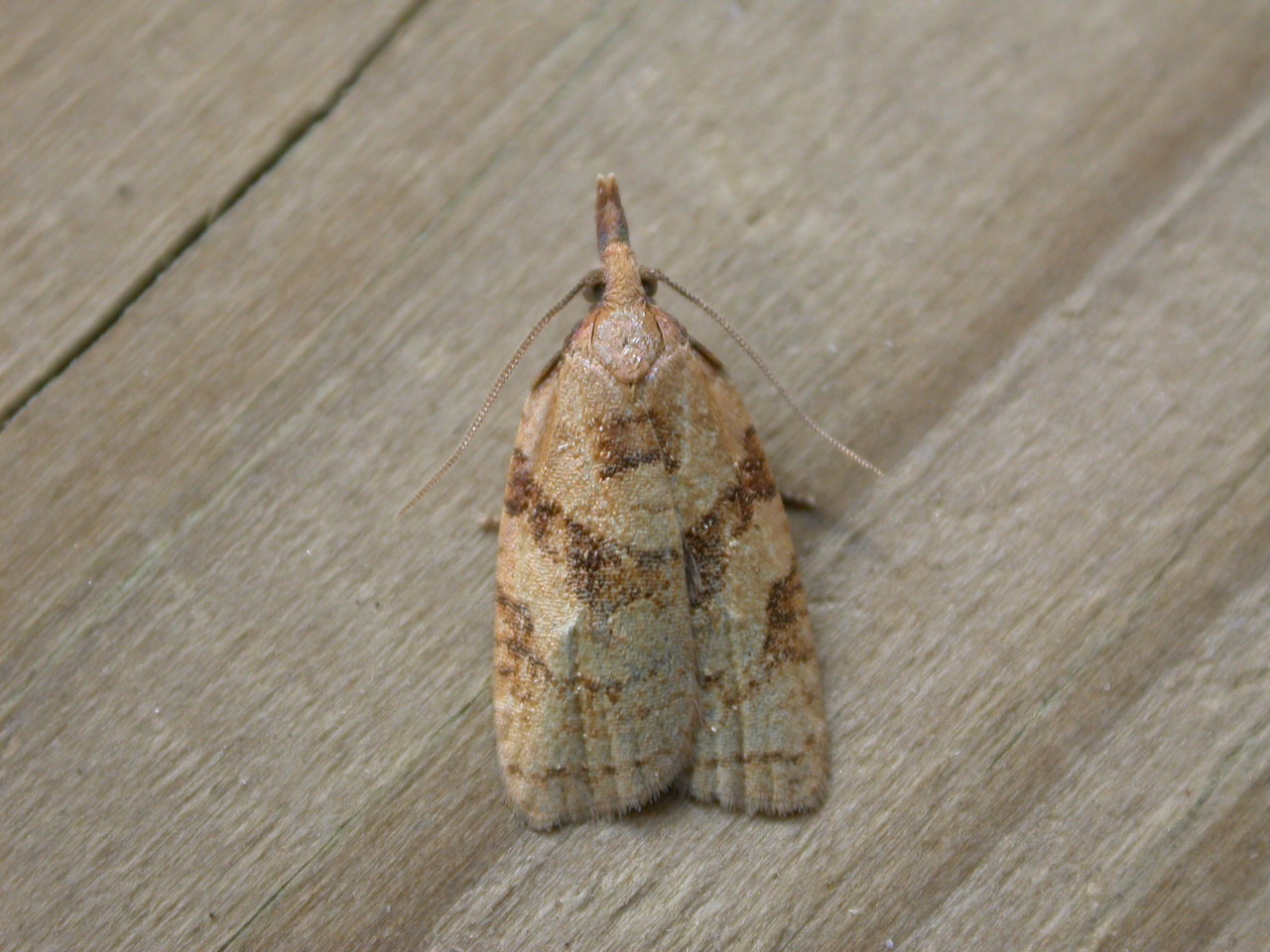

Scientific classification
- Domain: Eukaryota
- Kingdom: Animalia
- Phylum: Arthropoda
- Class: Insecta
- Order: Lepidoptera
- Family: Tortricidae
- Genus: Sparganothis
- Species: S. pilleriana

Binomial name
- Sparganothis pilleriana (Denis & Schiffermüller, 1775)

Synonyms
- List: Tortrix pilleriana Denis & Schiffermuller, 1775; Pyralis danticana Walcken, 1836; Tortrix luteolana Hubner, [1796-1799]; Oenophthira pilleriana ab. obscurana Preissecker, 1934; Pyralis pillerana Fabricius, 1794; Sparganothis pilleriana f. uniformata Dufrane, 1960; Pyralis vitana Fabricius, 1794; Pyralis vitis Dantic, 1786

= Sparganothis pilleriana =

Long-palped tortrix moth

Sparganothis pilleriana, also known as the vine leafroller tortrix, is a moth of the family Tortricidae found in the Palearctic realm. It was first described by the Austrian lepidopterists Michael Denis and Ignaz Schiffermüller in 1775.

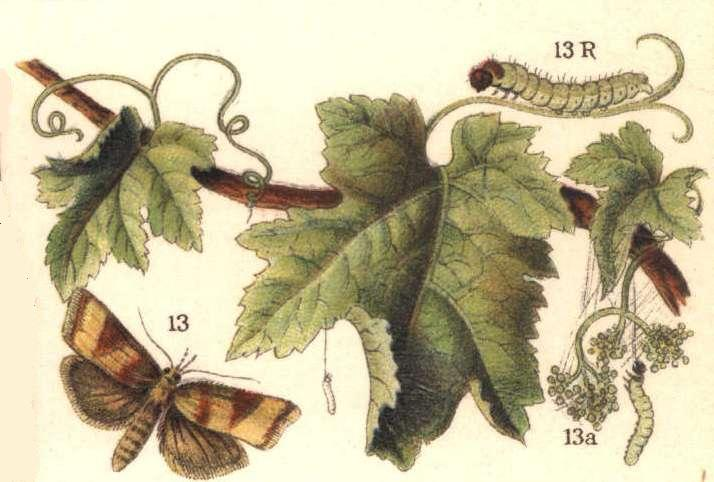

== Description ==
The wingspan of female is 17–22 mm. and the male 15–20 mm. The long labial palps help distinguish this species from other tortrix moths. The moth flies in one generation from July to August.

== Life cycle ==
Eggs are laid on the foodplant in batches of forty to sixty in July and August. Initially emerald-green, they change to greenish-yellow and later yellow. The eggs hatch in September and the larvae overwinter and continue to feed until May and June. They have a black head and prothoracic plate, with a pale green to greyish green body and a narrow darker green dorsal line. Feeding is within folded and spun leaves of various herbaceous plants and pupation occurs inside the rolled leaves.

=== Foodplants ===
Sparganothis pilleriana larvae are polyphagous and recorded foodplants include field wormwood (Artemisia campestris), knapweeds (Centaurea species), Clematis species, burning bush (Dictamnus albus), dyer's greenweed (Genista tinctoria), hop (Humulus), Iris species, common sea-lavender (Limonium vulgare), honeysuckle (Lonicera species), Lysimachia species, apple (Malus species), marjoram (Origanum species), bog asphodel (Narthecium ossifragum), Turkish pine (Pinus brutia), stone pine (Pinus pinea), plantain (Plantago species), Solomon's seal (Polygonatum species), pear (Pyrus species), burnet rose (Rosa spinosissima), bramble (Rubus species), sage (Salvia officinalis), stonecrop (Sedum species), woundworts (Stachys species), Tanacetum corymbosum, woodsage (Teucrium scorodonia), white swallow-wort (Vincetoxicum hirundinaria) and common grape vine (Vitis vinifera).

=== As a pest ===
The larvae can cause occasional and serious damage to grapevines. Chemical control is inefficient because the larva feed within a folded and spun leaf. Research in France has found that using a sex pheromone to disrupt mating was successful in reducing larvae numbers and was more environmentally friendly.
