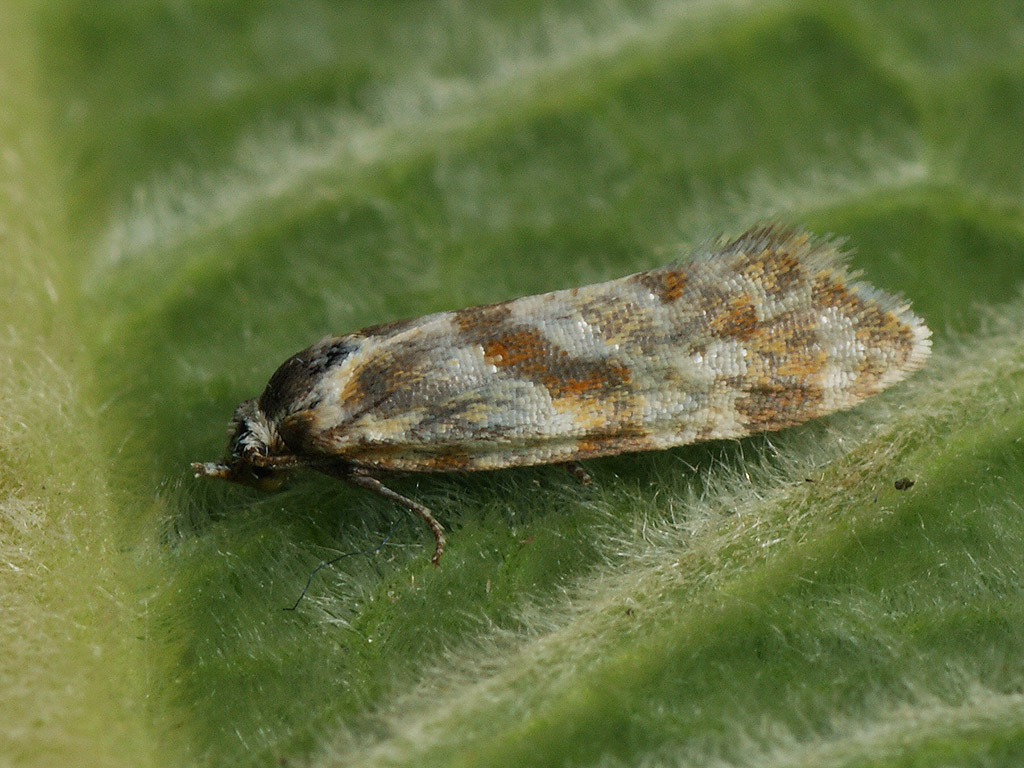

Scientific classification
- Domain: Eukaryota
- Kingdom: Animalia
- Phylum: Arthropoda
- Class: Insecta
- Order: Lepidoptera
- Family: Tortricidae
- Genus: Aethes
- Species: A. kindermanniana

Binomial name
- Aethes kindermanniana (Treitschke, 1830)

Synonyms
- Cochylis kindermanniana Treitschke, 1830; Cochylis kindermannaa Fischer von Roslerstamm, 1834

= Aethes kindermanniana =

Species of moth

Aethes kindermanniana is a species of moth of the family Tortricidae. It was described by Treitschke in 1830. It is found on Sardinia and in Denmark, Germany, France, Spain, Italy, Switzerland, Austria, the Czech Republic, Slovakia, Poland, Hungary, Romania, Norway, Sweden, Finland, the Baltic region, Ukraine, Russia. and Asia Minor. It has also been recorded from North America.

The wingspan is 13–17 millimetres (0.51–0.67 in). Adults are on wing in March and from May to August.

The larvae feed on Artemisia campestris, Chrysanthemum species and Tanacetum corymbosum. Larvae can be found nearly year round.
