= Pyrethrum =

Genus of plants and natural insecticide

Pyrethrum was a genus of several Old World plants now classified in either Chrysanthemum or Tanacetum which are cultivated as ornamentals for their showy flower heads. Pyrethrum continues to be used as a common name for plants formerly included in the genus Pyrethrum. Pyrethrum is also the name of a natural insecticide made from the dried flower heads of Chrysanthemum cinerariifolium and Chrysanthemum coccineum. The insecticidal compounds present in these species are pyrethrins.

== Description ==
Some members of the genus Chrysanthemum, such as the following two, are placed in the genus Tanacetum instead by some botanists. Both genera are members of the daisy (or aster) family, Asteraceae. They are all perennial plants with a daisy-like appearance and white or colored petals.

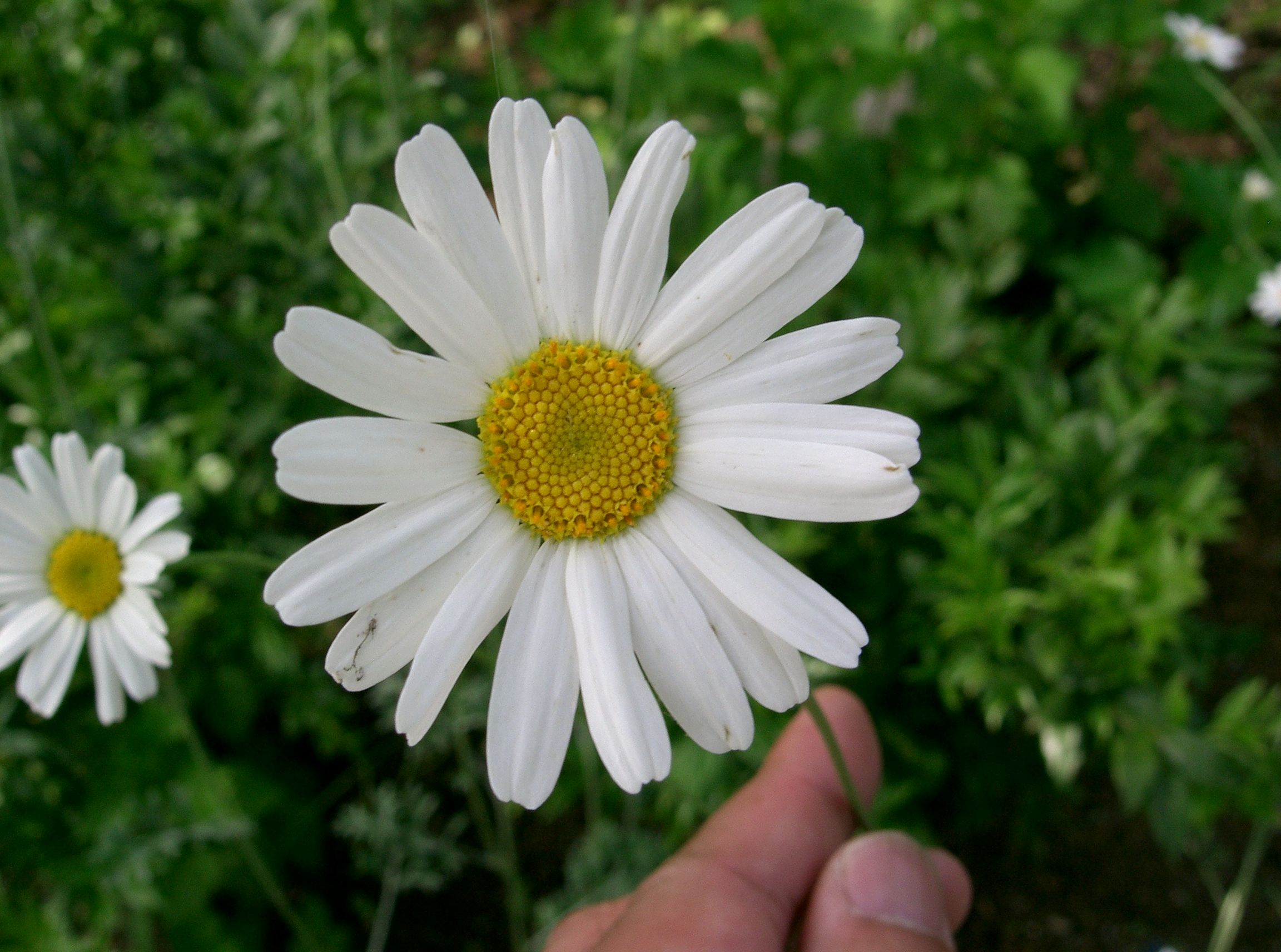
- Tanacetum cinerariifolium
  Tanacetum cinerariifolium is called the Dalmatian chrysanthemum, denoting its origin in that region of the Balkans (Dalmatia). It looks more like the common daisy than other pyrethrums do. Its flowers, typically white with yellow centers, grow from numerous fairly rigid stems. Plants have blue-green leaves and grow to 45 to 100 cm (18 to 39 in) in height. The plant is economically important as a natural source of pyrethrin insecticides.
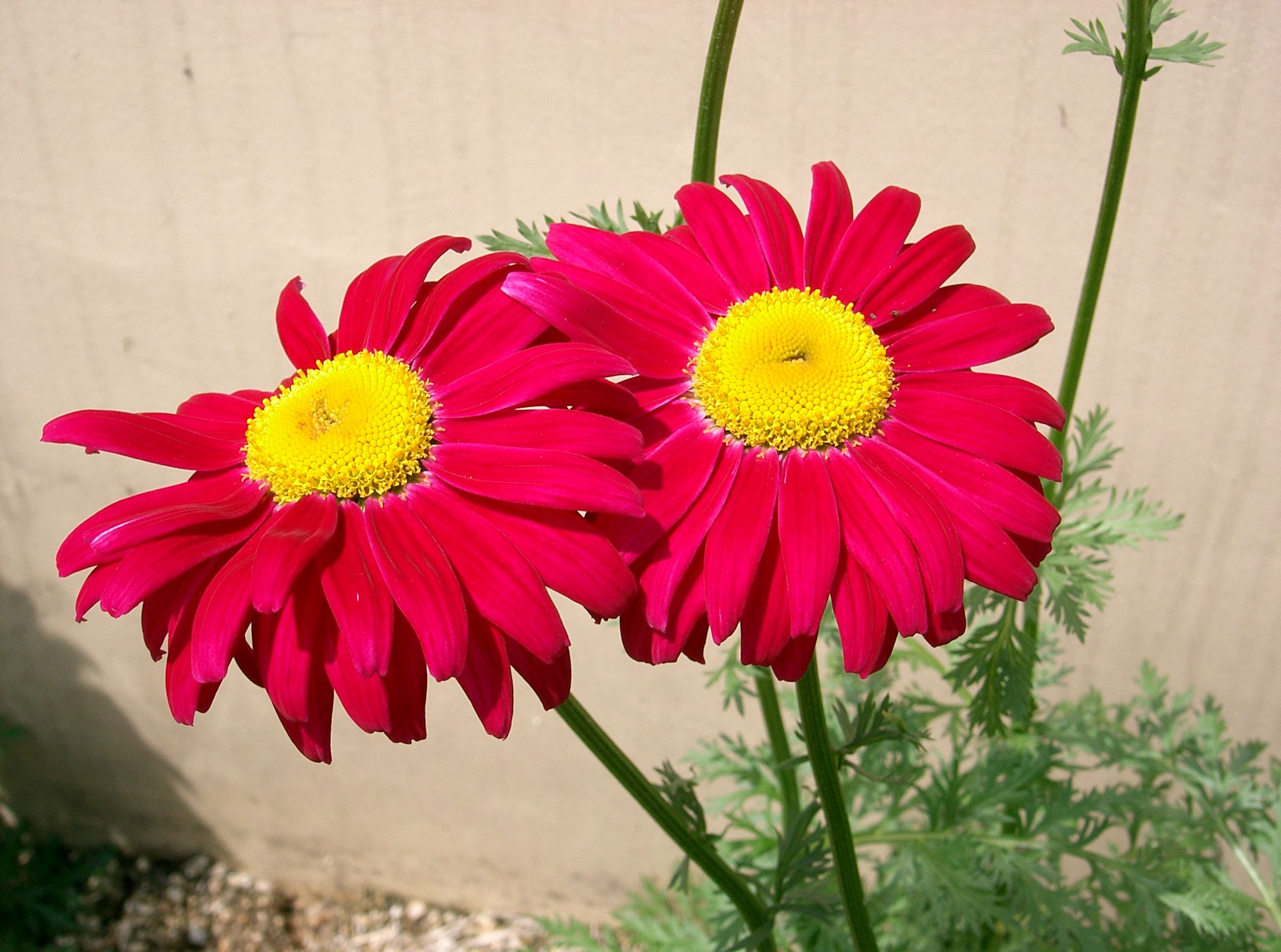
- Tanacetum coccineum
  C. coccineum, the Persian chrysanthemum, is a perennial plant native to Caucasus and looks somewhat like a daisy. It produces large white, pink or red flowers. The leaves resemble those of ferns, and the plant grows to between 30 and 60 cm (12 and 24 in) in height. The flowering period is June to July in temperate climates (Northern Hemisphere). C. coccineum also contains insecticidal pyrethrins, but it is a poor source compared to C. cinerariifolium.
- Other species, such as C. balsamita and C. marshalli, also contain insecticidal substances, but are less effective than the two species mentioned above.

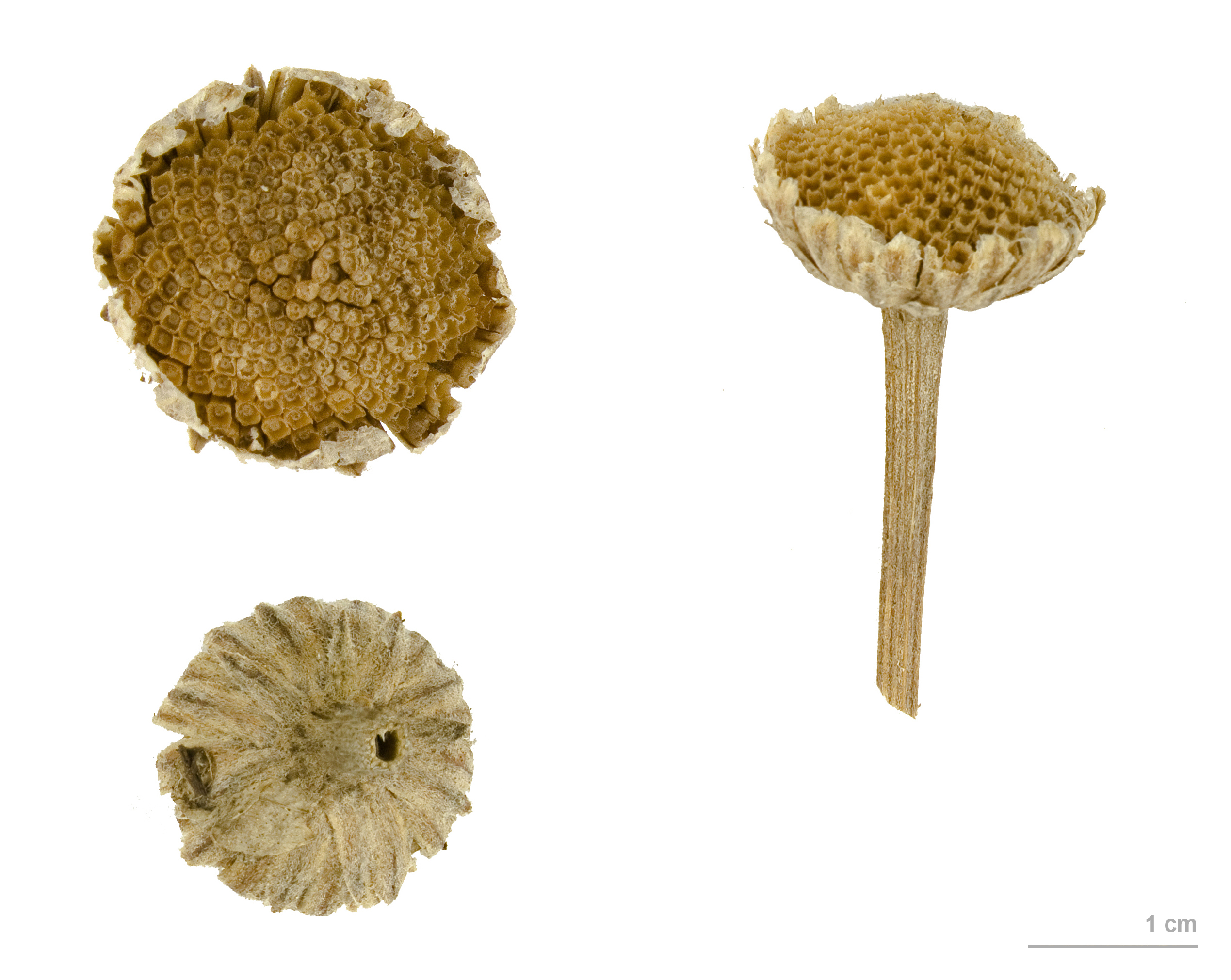
Tanacetum cinerariifolium

== Insecticides ==
Pyrethrin-I, the antifeedant in chrysanthemums

The flowers are pulverized and the active components, called pyrethrins, contained in the seed cases, are extracted and sold in the form of an oleoresin. This is applied as a suspension in water or oil, or as a powder. Pyrethrins attack the nervous systems of all insects, and inhibit female mosquitoes from biting. When present in amounts less than those fatal to insects, they still appear to have an insect repellent effect. They are harmful to fish, but are far less toxic to mammals and birds than many synthetic insecticides and are not persistent, being biodegradable and also decompose easily on exposure to light. They are considered to be amongst the safest insecticides for use around food. In 1998 Kenya was producing 90% (over 6,000 tonnes) of the world's pyrethrum, called py for short. Production in Tanzania and Ecuador is also significant. Currently the world's major producer is Tasmania, Australia.

=== Sprays ===
Pyrethrum has been used for centuries as an insecticide, and as a lice remedy in the Middle East (Persian powder, also known as "Persian pellitory"). It was sold worldwide under the brand Zacherlin by Austrian industrialist J. Zacherl. It is one of the most commonly used non-synthetic insecticides allowed in certified organic agriculture.

The flowers should be dried and then crushed and mixed with water.

- Pyrethroids are synthetic insecticides based on natural pyrethrum (pyrethrins); one common example is permethrin. Pyrethrins are often sold in preparations that also contain the synthetic chemical piperonyl butoxide, which enhances the toxicity to insects and is faster acting compared with pyrethrins used alone. These formulations are known as synergized pyrethrins.

=== Companion planting ===
A pheromone produced by these plants attracts ladybug beetles, and at the same time acts as an alarm signal to aphids.

== Toxicity ==
=== Mammals ===
Rat and rabbit LD_{50} levels for pyrethrum are high, with doses in some cases of about 1% of the animal's body weight required to cause significant mortality. This is similar to fatal levels in synthetic pyrethroids. Nevertheless, pyrethrum should be handled with the same caution as synthetic insecticides: safety equipment should be worn, and mixing with other chemicals should be avoided.

People can be exposed to pyrethrum as a mixture of cinerin, jasmolin, and pyrethrin in the workplace by breathing it in, getting it in the eyes or on the skin, or swallowing it. The Occupational Safety and Health Administration (OSHA) has set the legal limit (Permissible exposure limit) for pyrethrum exposure in the workplace as 5 mg/m^{3} over an 8-hour workday. The National Institute for Occupational Safety and Health (NIOSH) has set a Recommended exposure limit (REL) of 5 mg/m^{3} over an 8-hour workday. At levels of 5000 mg/m^{3}, pyrethrum is immediately dangerous to life and health. People exposed to pyrethrum may experience symptoms including pruritus (itching), dermatitis, papules, erythema (red skin), rhinorrhea (runny nose), sneezing, and asthma.

=== Other animals ===
Pyrethrum, specifically the pyrethrin within, is highly toxic to insects including useful pollinators like bees. The risk of killing bees and other beneficial insects is partially reduced by the compound's rapid breakdown (a half-life of approximately 12 hours on plants and on the surface of the soil, with about 3% remaining after five days, but persisting several weeks or more if it enters a body of water or is dug into the soil) and its slight insect-repellant activity.

== Common names ==
Common names for Chrysanthemum cinerariifolium include:

- Pyrethrum
- Pyrethrum daisy
- Dalmatian pyrethrum
- Dalmatian chrysanthemum
- Dalmatian insect flower
- Dalmatian pellitory
- Big daisy

Common names for Chrysanthemum coccineum include:

- Pyrethrum
- Pyrethrum daisy
- Painted daisy
- Persian chrysanthemum
- Persian insect flower
- Persian pellitory
- Caucasian insect powder plant

== See also ==
- Chrysanthemum
- List of companion plants
- Category: Plant toxin insecticides
- Permethrin
- Pyrethrin
