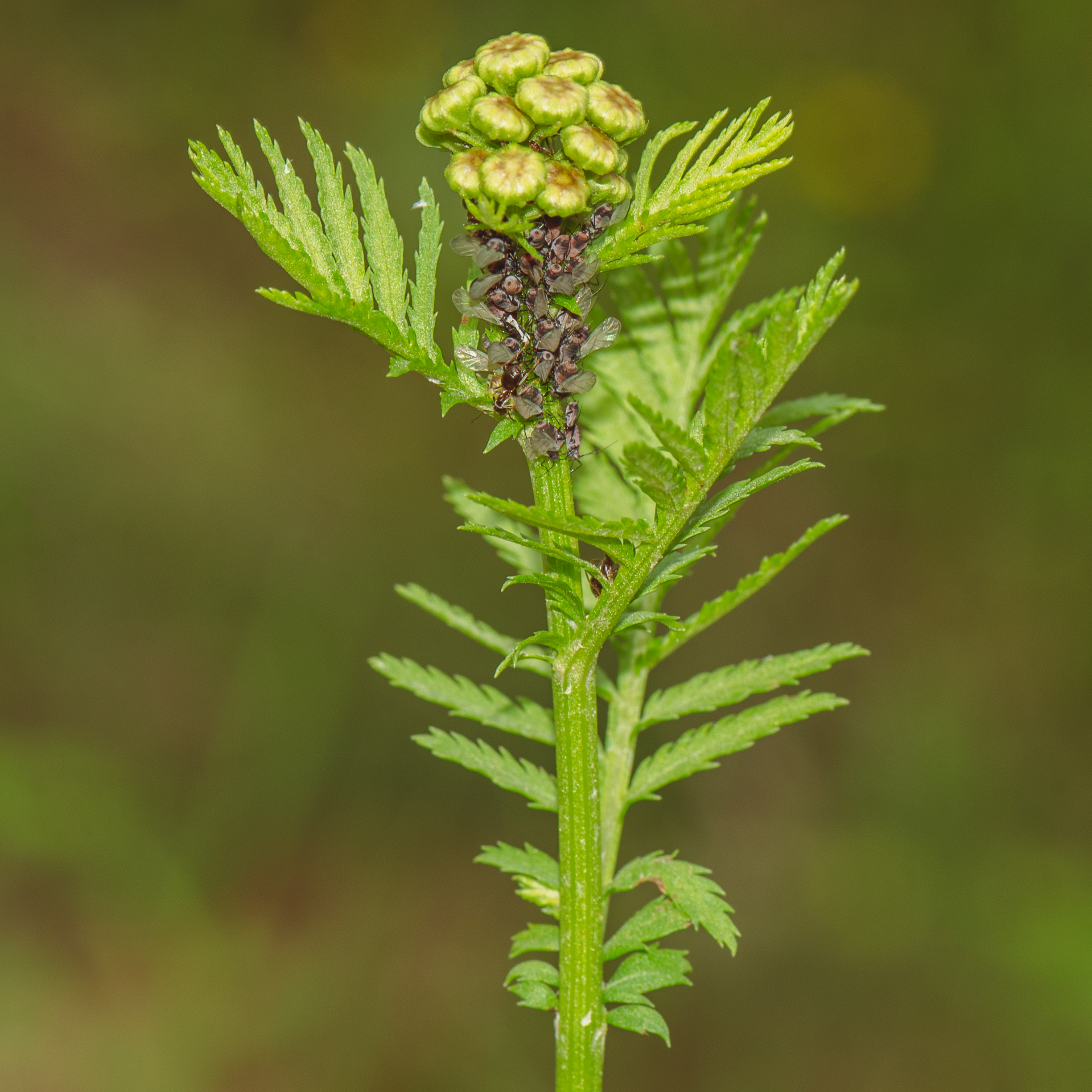
- Pink tansy aphid on Tanacetum vulgare

Scientific classification
- Kingdom: Animalia
- Phylum: Arthropoda
- Clade: Pancrustacea
- Class: Insecta
- Order: Hemiptera
- Suborder: Sternorrhyncha
- Family: Aphididae
- Genus: Metopeurum
- Species: M. fuscoviride

Binomial name
- Metopeurum fuscoviride H.L.G. Stroyan, 1950

= Metopeurum fuscoviride =

Species of true bug

Metopeurum fuscoviride, the pink tansy aphid, is an aphid of the family Aphididae. The species was first described by H.L.G. Stroyan in 1950.

== Distribution ==
The species is widespread in parts of Denmark, Sweden, Norway, Finland, Britain, North Germany, Spain, Bulgaria and Russia.

== Ecology ==
It can be found on tansy and occasionally Achillea millefolium. They feed of the stem of tansies and form large colonies there. On average a single insect produces 1 milligram of honeydew per hour. Compared to other aphids ants prefer collecting honeydew from Metopeurum fuscoviride. Large colonies often get destroyed by parasitoids of the order Hymenoptera.
