= Coleophora bornicensis =

Scientific classification
- Kingdom: Animalia
- Phylum: Arthropoda
- Class: Insecta
- Order: Lepidoptera
- Family: Coleophoridae
- Genus: Coleophora
- Species: C. bornicensis

Binomial name
- Coleophora bornicensis Fuchs, 1886

Species of moth

Coleophora bornicensis is a moth of the family Coleophoridae. It is found in Germany and Turkey.

The larvae feed on the flowers of Tanacetum vulgare.
