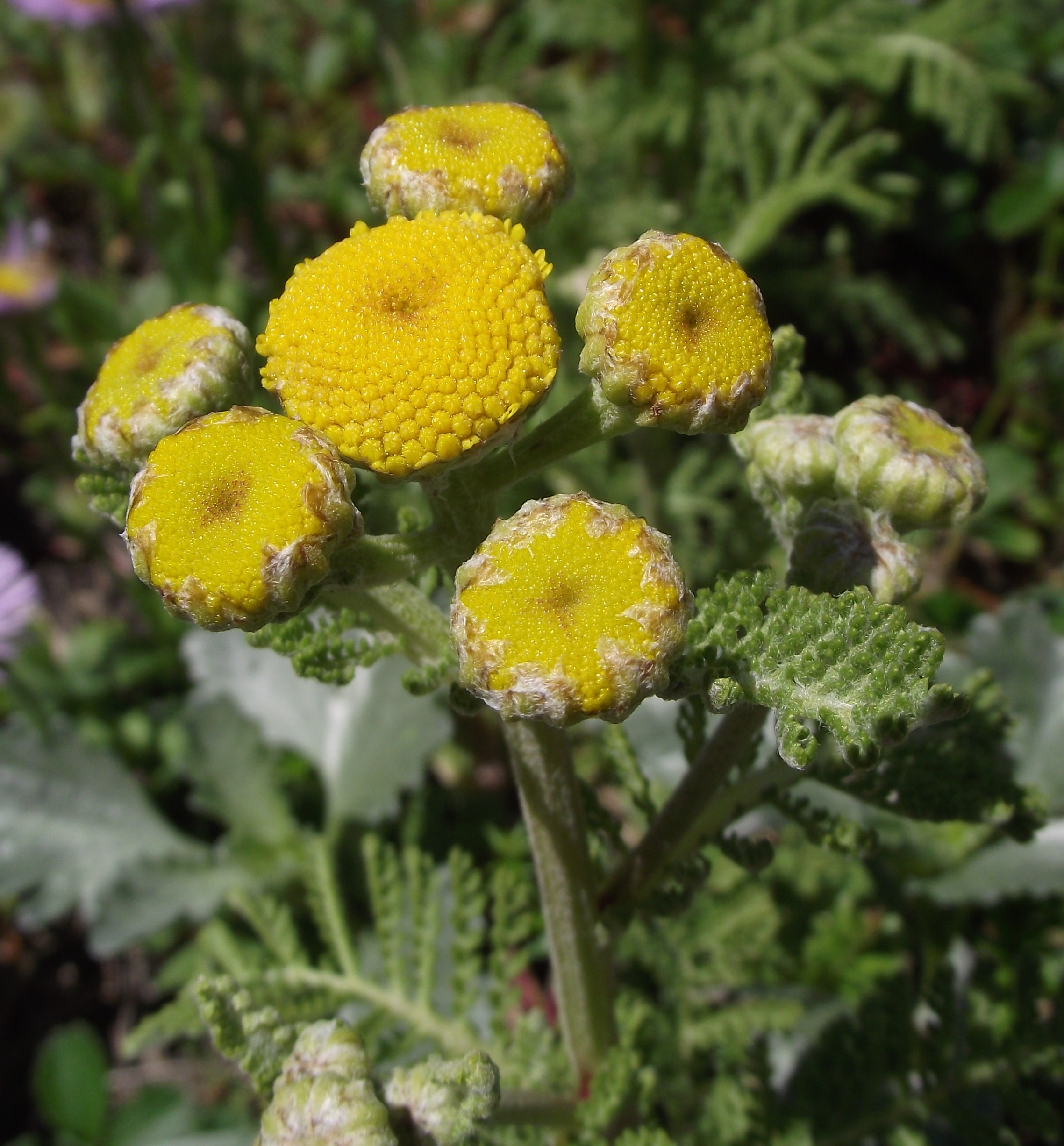

Scientific classification
- Kingdom: Plantae
- Clade: Tracheophytes
- Clade: Angiosperms
- Clade: Eudicots
- Clade: Asterids
- Order: Asterales
- Family: Asteraceae
- Genus: Tanacetum
- Species: T. camphoratum

Binomial name
- Tanacetum camphoratum Less.

= Tanacetum camphoratum =

Species of flowering plant

Tanacetum camphoratum is a species of flowering plant in the aster family known by the common names camphor tansy and dune tansy.

== Taxonomy ==
It was formerly known as Tanacetum douglasii, now a synonym, and is often included in T. bipinnatum.

== Description ==
It is a rhizomatous, perennial herb growing up to 60 centimetres (24 in) tall. It has a thick, low-lying stem up to 25 cm (10 in) long, branching to form a mass of vegetation. It is hairy, glandular, and aromatic, with a camphor scent. The leaves are up to 20 cm long and thick but featherlike, divided into many narrow leaflets on each side of the main rachis. Each leaflet in turn has many segments along each side, and the segments are usually divided into several small, knobby segments with folded or curled edges. Blooming from June to September, the inflorescence bears up to perhaps 20 flower heads, each about 1.5 cm wide. Each head contains many yellowish disc florets and many pistillate florets around the edges. The latter may have minute ray florets. The fruit is an achene a few millimeters long which is tipped with a small pappus of toothed scales.

=== Similar species ===
It resembles the toxic T. vulgare (common tansy), which lacks the hairs and has up to 200 flower heads.

== Distribution and habitat ==
The species is native to the Pacific Coast of North America from British Columbia to northern California, where it grows on coastal sand dunes.
