= Chrysanthemum vulgare =

Chrysanthemum vulgare can refer to:

- Chrysanthemum vulgare (L.) Bernh., a synonym of Tanacetum vulgare L., tansy
- Chrysanthemum vulgare (Lam.) Gaterau, a synonym of Leucanthemum vulgare subsp. vulgare Lam., ox-eye daisy
