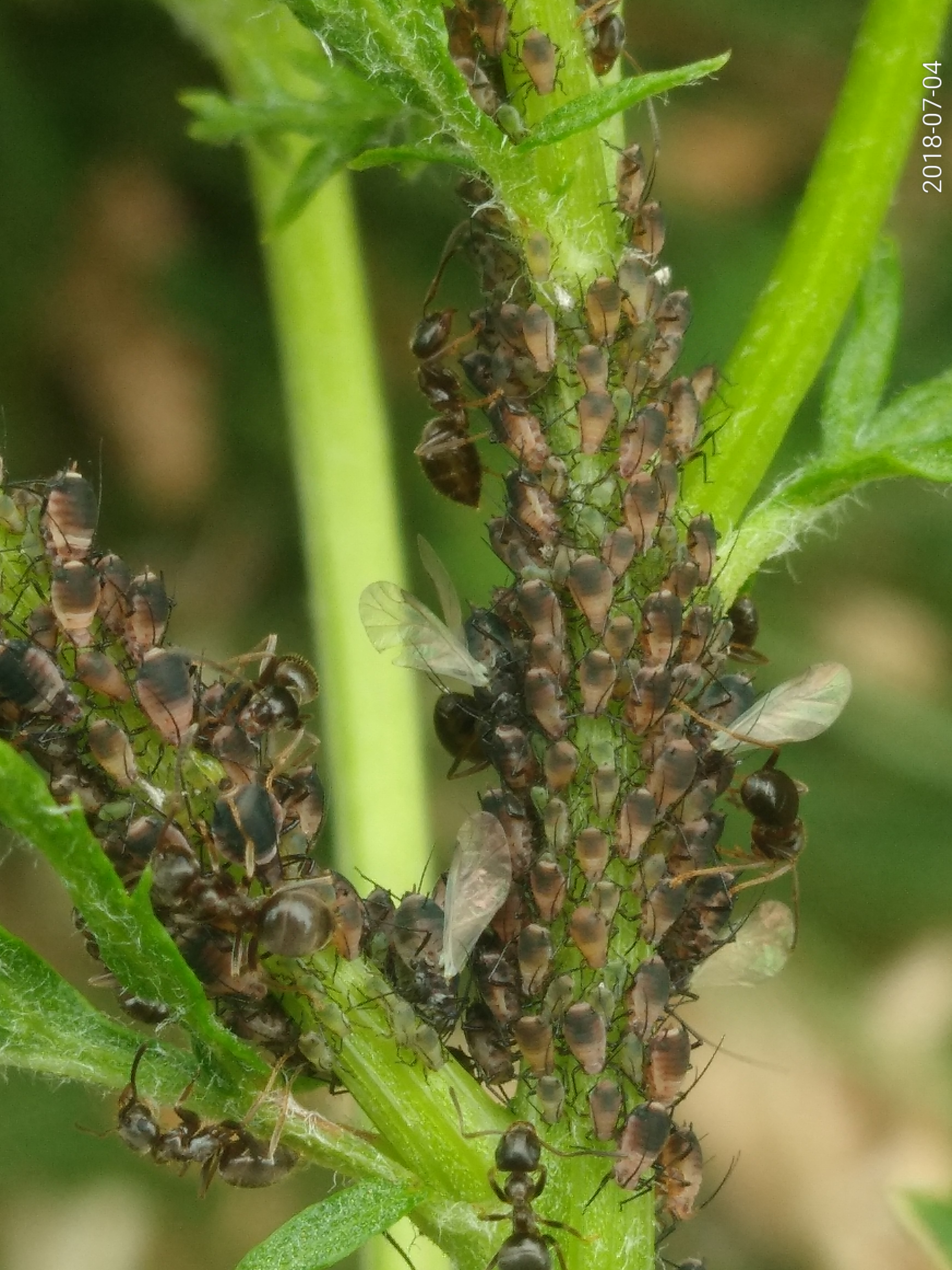
- Pink tansy aphids (Metopeurum fuscoviride)

Scientific classification
- Domain: Eukaryota
- Kingdom: Animalia
- Phylum: Arthropoda
- Class: Insecta
- Order: Hemiptera
- Suborder: Sternorrhyncha
- Family: Aphididae
- Genus: Metopeurum; Mordvilko, 1914

= Metopeurum =

Genus of true bugs

Metopeurum is a genus of true bugs belonging to the family Aphididae.

The species of this genus are found in Europe and Western Asia.

Species:

- Metopeurum achilleae Bozhko, 1959
- Metopeurum borystenicum Bozhko, 1959
- Metopeurum buryatica (Pashtshenko, 1999)
- Metopeurum capillatum (Börner, 1950)
- Metopeurum enslini (Börner, 1933)
- Metopeurum fuscoviride Stroyan, 1950
- Metopeurum gentianae Mamontova & Tshumak, 1994
- Metopeurum matricariae Bozhko, 1959
- Metopeurum millefolii Mamontova & Tshumak, 1994
- Metopeurum paeke
- Metopeurum urticae Mamontova & Tshumak, 1994
