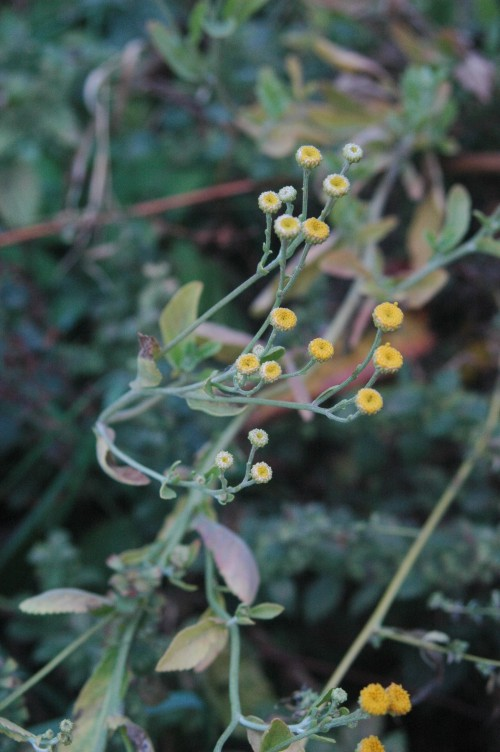

Conservation status
- Secure (NatureServe)

Scientific classification
- Kingdom: Plantae
- Clade: Tracheophytes
- Clade: Angiosperms
- Clade: Eudicots
- Clade: Asterids
- Order: Asterales
- Family: Asteraceae
- Genus: Tanacetum
- Species: T. balsamita

Binomial name
- Tanacetum balsamita L.

Synonyms
- Balsamita balsamita (L.) Rydb. nom. illeg.; Balsamita major Desf.; Balsamita suaveolens Pers.; Balsamita vulgaris Willd.; Chamaemelum balsamita (L.) E.H.L.Krause; Chrysanthemum balsamita (L.) Baill.; Chrysanthemum grande (L.) Hook.f.; Chrysanthemum grandiflorum (Desf.) Dum.Cours.; Chrysanthemum majus (Desf.) Asch.; Chrysanthemum tanacetifolium (Desr.) Dum.Cours.; Chrysanthemum tanacetum Vis.; Leucanthemum balsamita (L.) Over; Matricaria balsamita (L.) Desr.; Pyrethrum majus (Desf.) Tzvelev

= Tanacetum balsamita =

Species of herb

Tanacetum balsamita is a perennial temperate herb known as costmary, alecost, balsam herb, bible leaf, or mint geranium. A fragrant plant native to southern Europe and western Asia, it has been used over centuries for culinary, aromatic, and traditional medicine purposes.

== Description ==
Costmary is a perennial with oval serrated leaves and can grow up to 2 m (6.6 ft) high. During summer, it shows small, yellow, button-shaped blossoms which appear in clusters.

== Name ==
The English name 'costmary' stems from 'costus of Saint Mary'. Also, in other languages, it is associated with the Virgin Mary, most probably because it was thought to be a treatment for women's diseases in folk medicine.

== Origin and spread ==
The plant seems to have originated in the Mediterranean. Whether the plant called "balsamita" described by Columella in 70 AD is the same is unclear. Costmary was widely grown since the medieval times in herb gardens until the late 19th and early 20th centuries. In the 21st century, it has mostly disappeared in Europe, but is still widely used in southwest Asia. It is referred to by Nicholas Culpeper as the 'balsam herb'.

== Phytochemicals ==
Leaves contain carvone as the main phytochemical (about 50% of total), together with minor amounts of β-thujone and other carvone-related chemicals.

== Traditional medicine ==
From medieval times through the 18th century, costmary was used in various supposed treatments of traditional medicine.

== Gallery ==
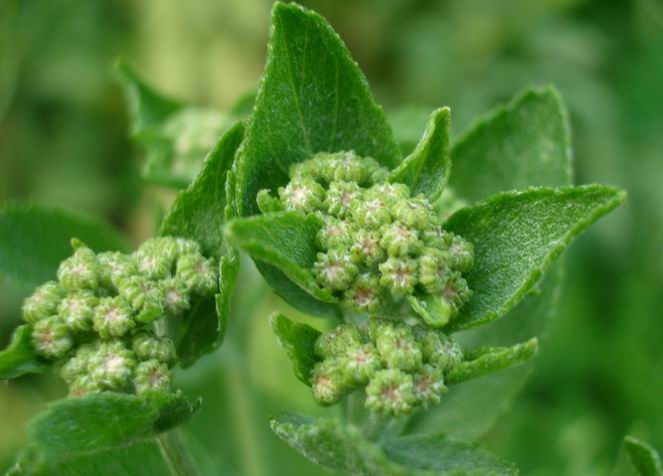
Flower clusters

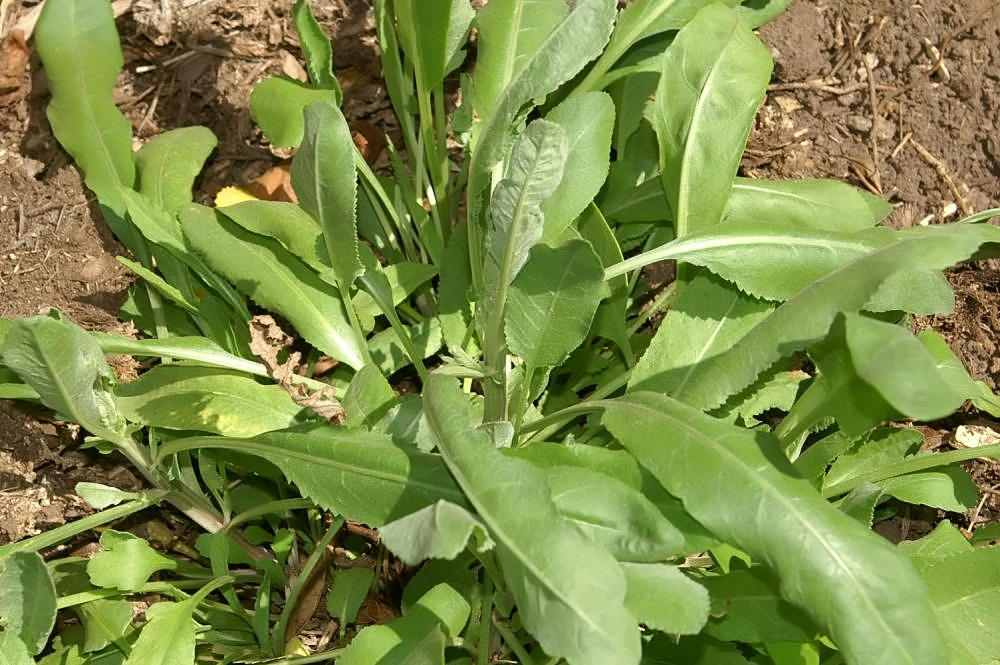
Leaves
