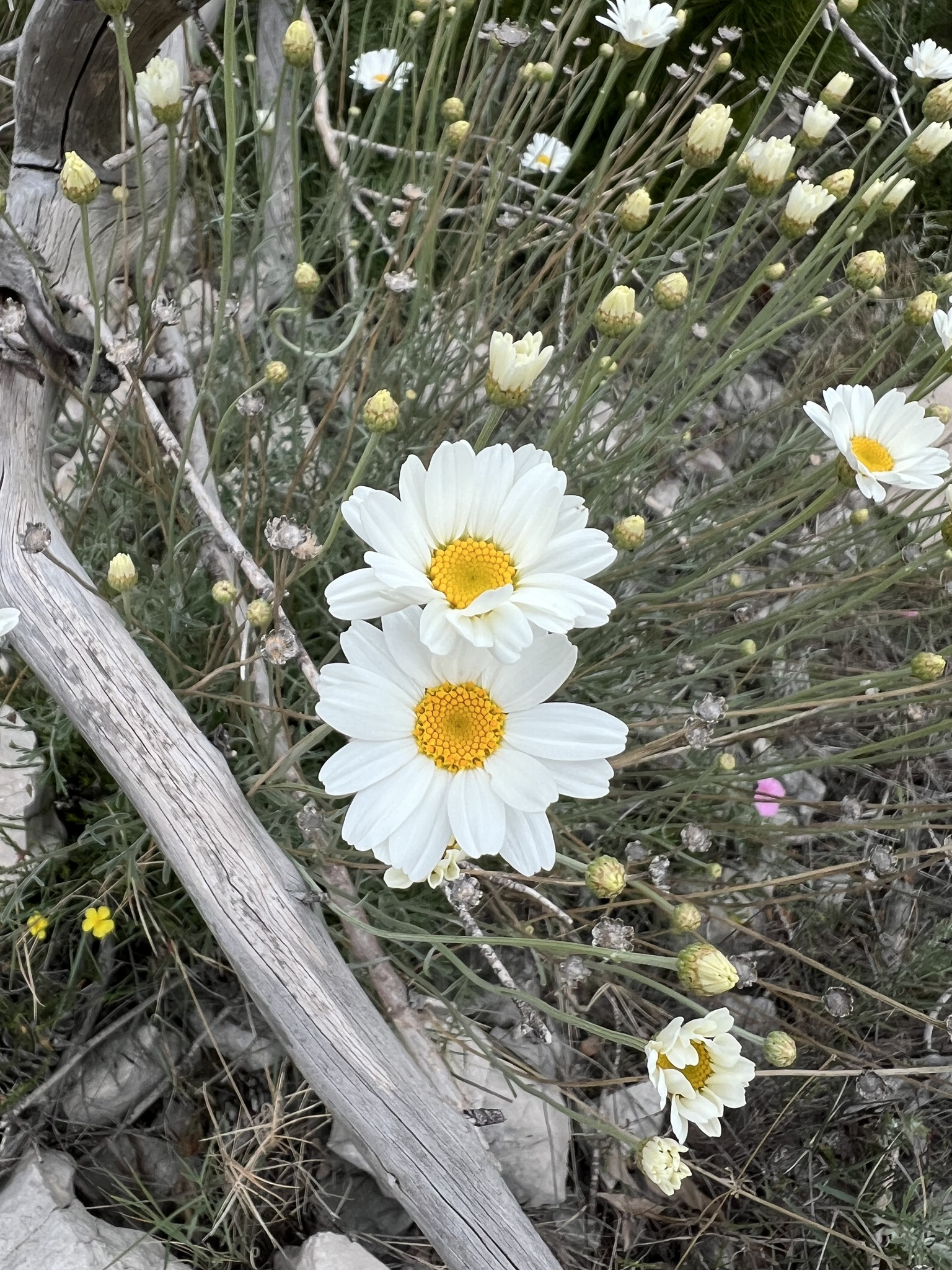

Scientific classification
- Kingdom: Plantae
- Clade: Tracheophytes
- Clade: Angiosperms
- Clade: Eudicots
- Clade: Asterids
- Order: Asterales
- Family: Asteraceae
- Genus: Tanacetum
- Species: T. cinerariifolium

Binomial name
- Tanacetum cinerariifolium (Trevir.) Sch.Bip.

Synonyms
- Chrysanthemum cinerariifolium (Trevir.) Vis.; Chrysanthemum rigidum Vis.; Chrysanthemum turreanum Vis.; Pyrethrum cinerariifolium Trevir. (1820) (basionym); Pyrethrum elongatum Duch.; Pyrethrum turreyanum Less.; Pyrethrum willemotii Duch.

= Tanacetum cinerariifolium =

Species of flowering plant

Tanacetum cinerariifolium is a species of flowering plant in the aster family, Asteraceae, and formerly part of the genus Pyrethrum, but now placed in the genus Chrysanthemum, or the genus Tanacetum by some biologists. It is called the Dalmatian chrysanthemum or Dalmatian pyrethrum, denoting its origin in western coastal Balkan Peninsula, where it ranges from Dalmatia to Albania. It looks more like the common daisy than other pyrethrums do. Its flowers, typically white with yellow centers, grow from numerous fairly rigid stems. Plants have blue-green leaves and grow to 45 to 100 cm (18 to 39 in) in height.

== As an insecticide ==
The plant is economically important as a natural source of an insecticide called "pyrethrum." The flowers are pulverized and the active components, called pyrethrins, contained in the seed cases, are extracted and sold in the form of an oleoresin. This is applied as a suspension in water or oil, or as a powder. Pyrethrins attack the nervous systems of all insects, and inhibit female mosquitoes from biting. When present in amounts less than those fatal to insects, they still appear to have an insect repellent effect. They are harmful to fish, but are far less toxic to mammals and birds than many synthetic insecticides and are not persistent, being biodegradable and also decompose easily on exposure to light. They are considered to be amongst the safest insecticides for use around food. Kenya produced 90% (over 6,000 tonnes) of the world's pyrethrum in 1998 (called py for short), and is still the world's major producer. Production in Tanzania and Ecuador is also significant.

The plant is also used in companion planting. See Pyrethrum § Companion planting.

== Safety ==
These plants can cause severe allergic reactions in some people. Prolonged contact with the dried flowers can cause allergic dermatitis, allergic rhinitis, and asthma.

== See also ==
- Pyrethroid
