= Jasmolone =

Names
- Preferred IUPAC name 4-Hydroxy-3-methyl-2-[(2E)-pent-2-en-1-yl]cyclopent-2-en-1-one
- Other names Jasmolone; Jasmololone; Jasmololon

Identifiers
CAS Number	54383-66-3; 93221-50-2
3D model (JSmol)	Interactive image; Interactive image
ChEBI	CHEBI:180842
ChemSpider	4524423
PubChem CID	5374699
UNII	H2NCU4J9V3
CompTox Dashboard (EPA)	DTXSID501018176
- InChI: InChI=1S/C11H16O2/c1-3-4-5-6-9-8(2)10(12)7-11(9)13/h4-5,10,12H,3,6-7H2,1-2H3/b5-4+ Key: SVRKACAGHUZSGU-SNAWJCMRSA-N
- SMILES: CCC=CCC1=C(C(CC1=O)O)C; CC/C=C/CC1=C(C(CC1=O)O)C

Properties
Chemical formula	C_{11}H_{16}O_{2}
Molar mass	180.247 g·mol^{−1}
- Except where otherwise noted, data are given for materials in their standard state (at 25 °C [77 °F], 100 kPa). Infobox references

Jasmolone is an irregular monoterpene. Irregular monoterpenes are derived from two isoprene C5 units, but do not follow the usual head-to-tail coupling mechanism. Jasmolins are found in pyrethrum flowers. They can specifically be found in the flower heads of Chrysanthemum cinerariaefolium. Jasmolins act as an insecticide for the flower. It is found in the cytoplasm of plants.

Jasmolone is part of the secondary alcohol family. Jasmolone is found in the alcohol portion of pyrethrins. It is thought that jasmolone is a derivative of cyclized and altered fatty acids. The cyclization of the fatty acids is similar to the biosynthetic pathway cyclization of prostaglandins.

A precursor of jasmolone could be alpha-linolenic acid with a 12-oxophytodienoic acid intermediate. The chain shortening could be produced by a beta-oxidation then a decarboxylation.

12-Oxophytodienoic acid is also used in the production of jasmonic acid. Jasmonic acid is used in the production of secondary metabolites in a plants signaling system. Jasmonic acid is used in a plant's response to a microbial infection or wound.

== Natural production ==
Jasmolone is one of the three alcohols (along with pyrethrolone and cinerolone) needed in combination with two specific acids (chrysanthemic acid and pyrethric acid) to form insecticidal esters. These six insecticidal esters are part of the pyrethrins family. So far, pyrethrins have been found in Chrysanthemum cinerariaefolium, Tagetes erecta, C. coccinum, Tagetes minuta, Z. linnearis, Calendula officinalis, Demorphotheca sinuate and Zinnia elegans. Pyrethrins are found mostly in the head of the flowers, but have also been found in the callus tissue of the flowers.

== Biosynthesis ==
α-Linolenic acid undergoes a radical oxidation with O_{2} and lipoxygenase to form a peroxide. Lipoxygenase is an iron-containing enzyme that is used to catalyze dioxygenation of polyunsaturated fatty acids in this case, α-linolenic acid. Lipooxygenase specifically binds to polyunsaturated fatty acids that have a cis,cis-1,4-pentadiene present. Next, an allene oxide synthase occurs followed by allene oxide cyclase. 12-Oxophytodienoic acid is formed. It is unknown how jasmolone is formed from 12-oxophytodienoic acid after this step.

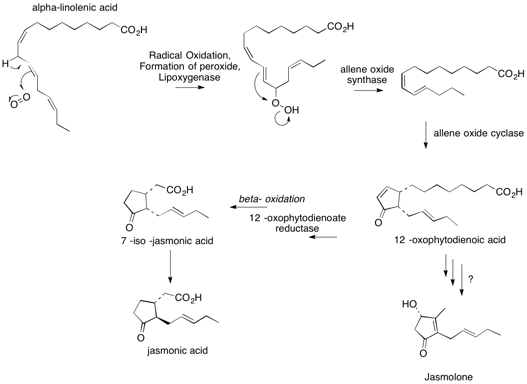
Biosynthesis of jasmolone

== Laboratory synthesis ==
(Z)-Jasmolone was synthesized by Jacqueline Ficini and Jean Pierre Genet in June 1975.

Jasmolone production
