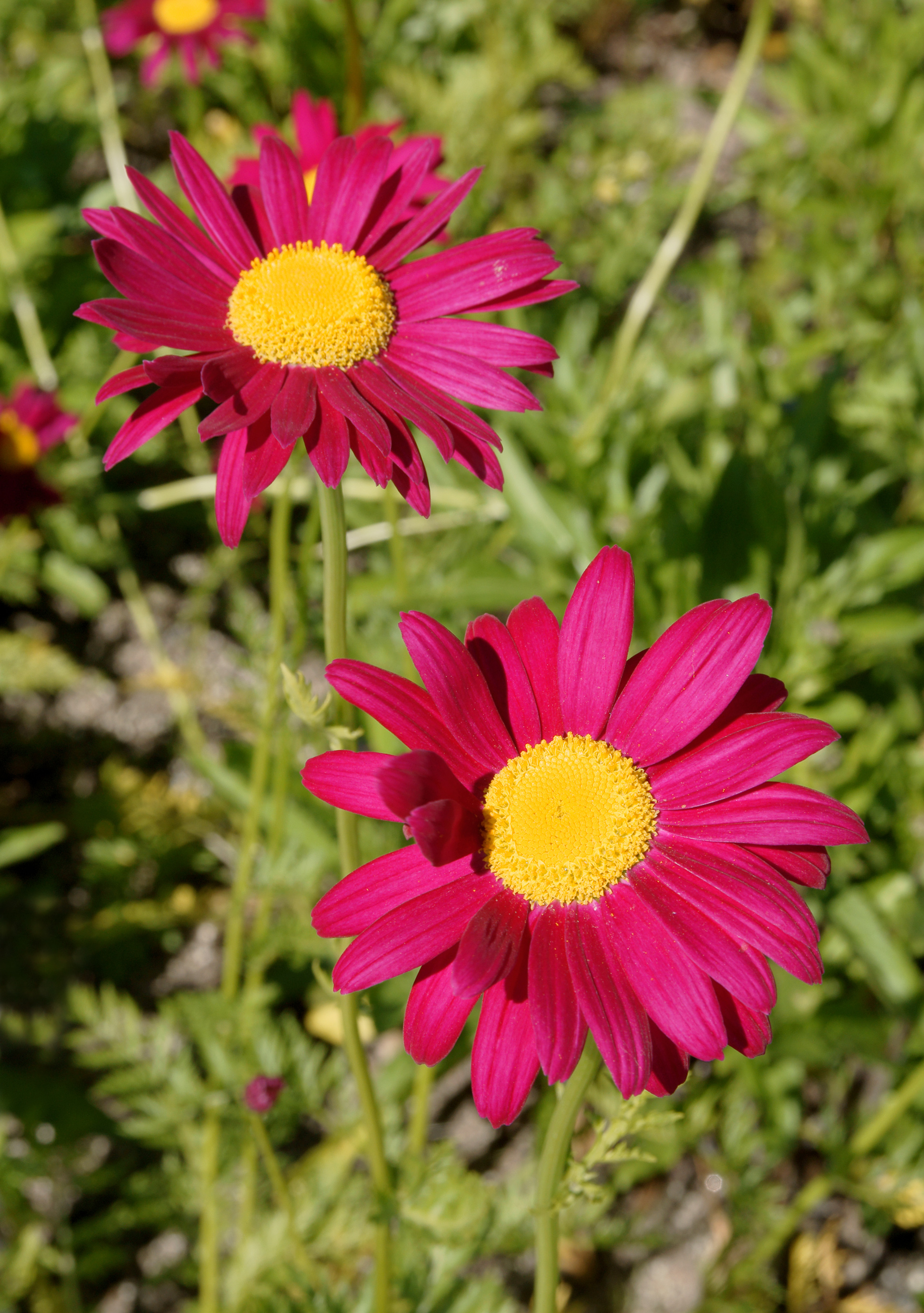

Scientific classification
- Kingdom: Plantae
- Clade: Embryophytes
- Clade: Tracheophytes
- Clade: Angiosperms
- Clade: Eudicots
- Clade: Asterids
- Order: Asterales
- Family: Asteraceae
- Genus: Tanacetum
- Species: T. coccineum

Binomial name
- Tanacetum coccineum (Willd.) Grierson

Synonyms
- Chrysanthemum coccineum Willd.; Matricaria coccinea (Willd.) Poir.; Pyrethrum coccineum (Willd.) Vorosch.

= Tanacetum coccineum =

Species of plant

Tanacetum coccineum, also known as the painted daisy, is a species of flowering plant within the family Asteraceae.

== Description ==
Tanacetum coccineum is a perennial, which can reach heights ranging between 20 and 60 cm tall. The leaves of the plant are mostly smooth and are either nearly stalkless or on short stalks ranging between 2 and 10 cm long. The lower leaves are larger and twice-divided into narrow, lance-shaped lobes, while the upper leaves become smaller and less divided. The flower heads are solitary and host a single flower per stem. Flowers can exhibit either pink, red or white petals and each flower possesses flat yellow disk florets in the centre of the bloom. Flowers can be encountered in single or double flower forms, with double flowers possessing more petals. The species is diploid, with a chromosome count of 36 (2n = 36).

== Distribution ==
Tanacetum coccineum is native to Eastern Europe to Central Asia, where it can be found in Iran, Kazakhstan, Tajikistan, Turkey, Uzbekistan, Eastern European Russia and the Caucasus. The species is popular in horticulture and has also been introduced outside of their natural range around the world. Countries it has been introduced into include: France, Germany, India, Italy, Jawa, Kirgizstan, Mexico Southeast, Mozambique, New York, Norway, Pakistan, Poland, Switzerland and the United Kingdom.

== Habitat ==
Tanacetum coccineum is native to hot and humid environments, where it grows on rocky mountain slopes.

== Subspecies ==
The following subspecies are recognised:

- Tanacetum coccineum subsp. carneum
- Tanacetum coccineum subsp. chamaemelifolium
- Tanacetum coccineum subsp. coccineum

== Cultivation ==
Tanacetum coccineum can be grown as an ornamental garden plant. The species can also be cultivated for its insecticide properties. Plants can be used in companion planting to repel pests from crops and ornamental garden plants. It can also be grown as a cut flower.

== Medical uses ==
In the Middle East the insecticide properties of Tanacetum coccineum are utilized to treat parasitic lice infestations. The insecticide powder produced from T. coccineum is known as Persian powder.

In Turkey this species is traditionally used as a medicinal plant to try and treat sterility. Parts of the plant are boiled in the process of decoction to produce a concentrated liquor.
