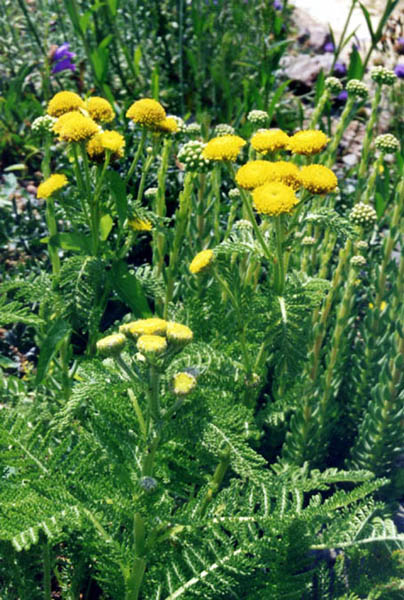
- Lake Huron tansy

Scientific classification
- Kingdom: Plantae
- Clade: Tracheophytes
- Clade: Angiosperms
- Clade: Eudicots
- Clade: Asterids
- Order: Asterales
- Family: Asteraceae
- Genus: Tanacetum
- Species: T. huronense

Binomial name
- Tanacetum huronense Nutt.

= Tanacetum huronense =

Species of flowering plant

Tanacetum huronense, also known as Lake Huron tansy, is a type of wildflower most commonly found on sand dunes around the Great Lakes. Lake Huron tansy currently requires conservation measures in some regions.

== Region ==
Lake Huron tansy is most commonly found around the northern coasts of Lake Michigan and Lake Huron as well as the southeast coast of Lake Superior, but has also been found in Maine and from Alaska across Canada. This plant lives in the sandy soil of the sand dunes and beaches of these regions. The Lake Huron tansy requires sun as well as dry sandy soil to thrive. However, this species can also handle waves when water levels are higher.

== Plant structure ==
Lake Huron tansy grows approximate 12” tall from 1-3 stems. If any part of the plant is crushed a very distinct odor is released, similar to the common garden tansy.

Lake Huron tansy typically blooms during the months of late June through early August. The flower is a yellow “daisy type” flower, composed of many smaller flowers. The flower head is made up of disk flowers and ray flowers fill in around the outer rim of the head. The flowers are typically 13-19mm in diameter.

The leaves are visually lacy and hairy. The structure of the leaves are bipinnately compound between 23 and 26 cm long and 3 to 9 cm wide.

== Conservation ==
Tanacetum huronense is currently being monitored by various states and countries. It is currently a threatened species in Michigan and endangered in Wisconsin. In addition, Lake Huron tansy is a special concern species in some Canadian provinces. According to the Wisconsin DNR, this species has a very high priority for conservation due to very few natural occurrences.

In Michigan, Lake Huron tansy is threatened by invasive species such as spotted knapweed and baby’s breath. In addition, this species is threatened by habitat destruction and disturbances from humans.
