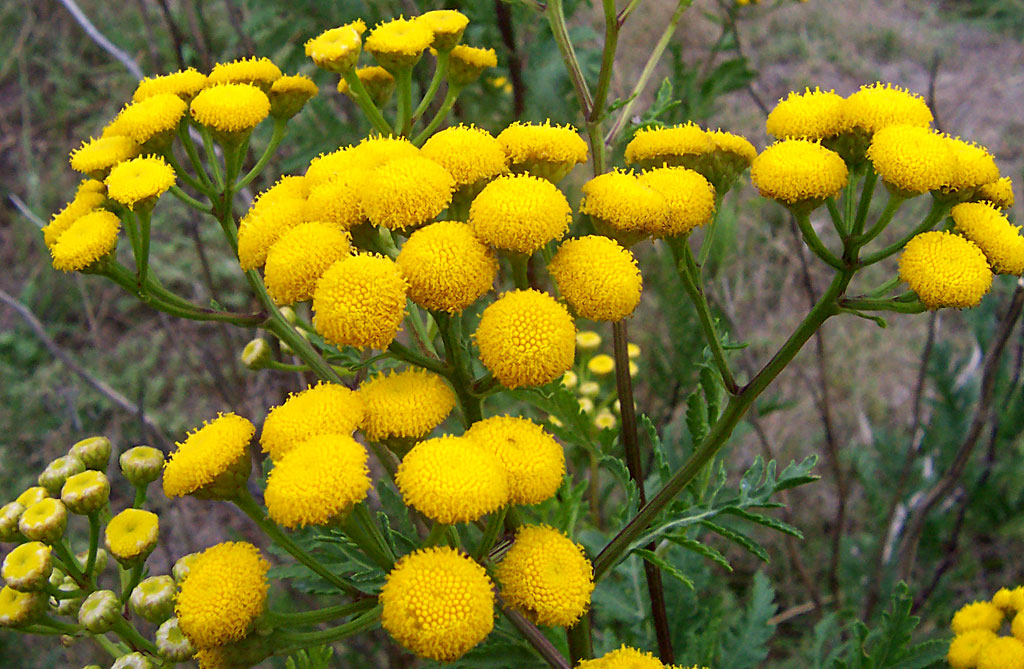
- Tanacetum vulgare

Scientific classification
- Kingdom: Plantae
- Clade: Tracheophytes
- Clade: Angiosperms
- Clade: Eudicots
- Clade: Asterids
- Order: Asterales
- Family: Asteraceae
- Subfamily: Asteroideae
- Tribe: Anthemideae
- Genus: Tanacetum; L. (1753)

Type species
- Tanacetum vulgare L.

Species
- About 160, see text

Synonyms
- Balsamita Mill.; Pyrethrum Zinn; Gymnocline Cass.; Pyrethrum Medik.; Spathipappus Tzvelev

= Tanacetum =

Genus of flowering plants

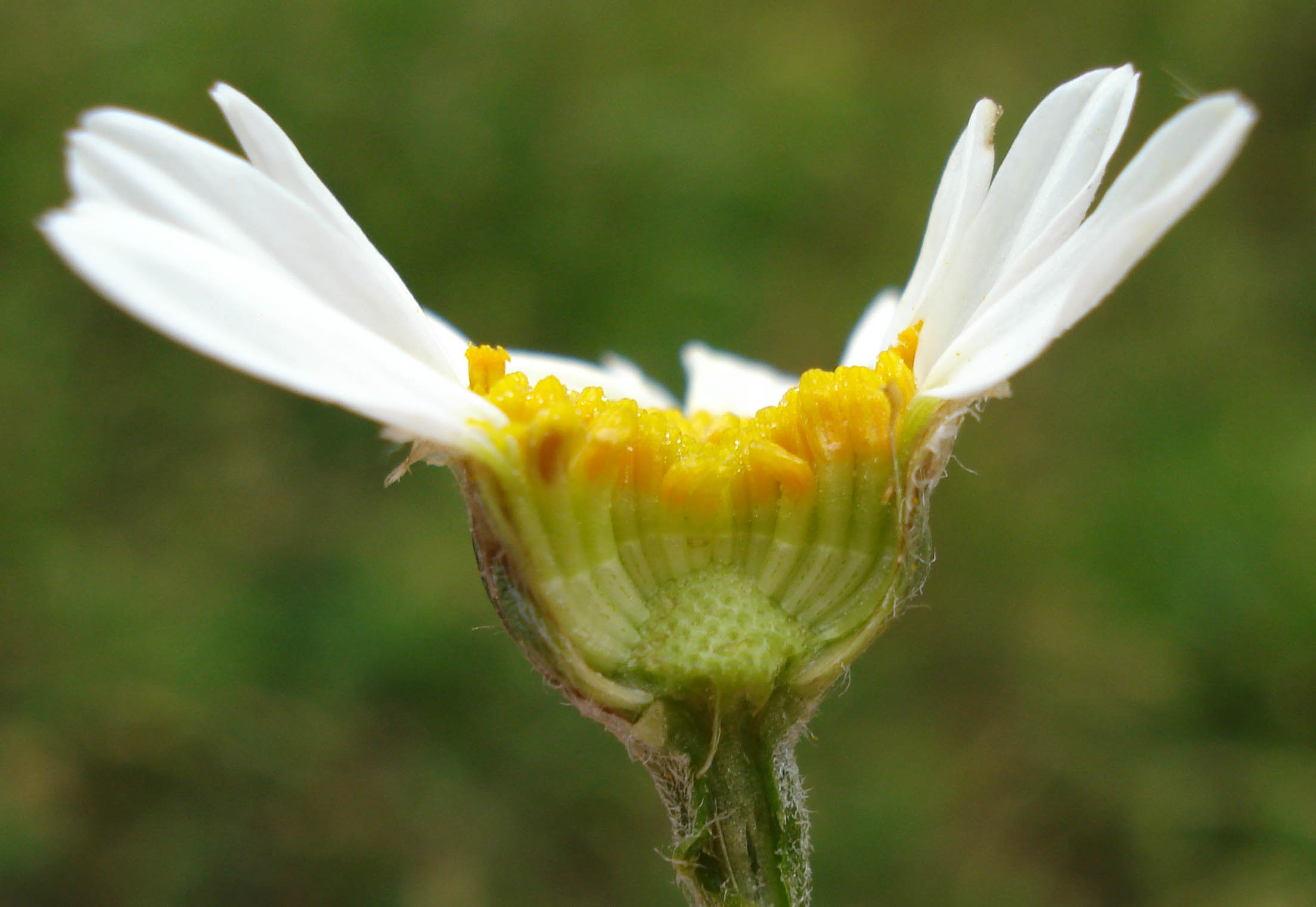
Tanacetum corymbosum

Tanacetum is a genus of about 160 species of flowering plants in the aster family, Asteraceae, native to many regions of the Northern Hemisphere. They are known commonly as tansies. The name tansy can refer specifically to Tanacetum vulgare, which may be called the common tansy or garden tansy for clarity. The generic name Tanacetum means 'immortality' in Botanical Latin, since tansy was once placed between the burial sheets of the dead to repel vermin.

Other familiar species include costmary (T. balsamita) and feverfew (T. parthenium).

Tansies are mainly perennial herbs, but some are annuals and subshrubs. Some are a few centimeters tall and some reach 1.5 metres (4 ft 11 in). They vary in form, with one or more branching stems growing erect or prostrate, usually from rhizomes. They are hairy to hairless in texture, and most are aromatic. The leaves are alternately arranged, the blades sometimes borne on petioles. They are usually deeply lobed and may have toothed edges. Most species have flowers in loose or dense inflorescences. The flower has layers of distinct phyllaries around its base and may be flat to hemispheric in shape. The flower has many yellow disc florets, sometimes over 300. Some species have ray florets in shades of yellow, or white with yellowish bases. Some species lack true ray florets but have flat yellowish disc florets that look like rays. The fruit is a ribbed, glandular cypsela, usually with a pappus on the end.

== Selected species ==
Species include:

- Tanacetum abrotanifolium (L.) Druce
- Tanacetum abrotanoides
- Tanacetum achilleifolium (M. Bieb.) Sch. Bip.
- Tanacetum alatavicum
- Tanacetum annuum – Moroccan Tansy, Blue Tansy
- Tanacetum argenteum (Lam.) Willd.
- Tanacetum atkinsonii (C.B.Clarke) Kitam.
- Tanacetum balsamita L. – costmary
- Tanacetum bipinnatum (L.) Sch. Bip. – Lake Huron tansy, camphor tansy
- Tanacetum camphoratum Less. – dune tansy
- Tanacetum cinerariifolium (Trevir.) Sch. Bip. – Dalmatian insect-flower, Dalmatian pyrethrum
- Tanacetum coccineum (Willd.) Grierson – garden pyrethrum, painted daisy, Persian insect-flower, Persian chrysanthemum
- Tanacetum corymbosum (L.) Sch. Bip. – scentless feverfew, corymbflower tansy
- Tanacetum densum (Labill.) Sch. Bip.
- Tanacetum falconeri
- Tanacetum ferulaceum (Sch. Bip.) Walp.
- Tanacetum haradjanii (Rech. f.) Grierson
- Tanacetum kaschgarianum
- Tanacetum krylovianum
- Tanacetum macrophyllum (Waldst. & Kit.) Sch. Bip. – rayed tansy
- Tanacetum microphyllum DC.
- Tanacetum niveum
- Tanacetum parthenifolium (Willd.) Sch. Bip.
- Tanacetum parthenium (L.) Sch. Bip. – feverfew
- Tanacetum pinnatum
- Tanacetum polycephalum
- Tanacetum poteriifolium (Nordm.) Grierson
- Tanacetum praeteritium (Horw.) Heywood
- Tanacetum ptarmiciflorum (Webb) Sch. Bip. – dusty-miller, silver-lace
- Tanacetum pulchrum
- Tanacetum richterioides
- Tanacetum santolina
- Tanacetum scopulorum
- Tanacetum tanacetoides
- Tanacetum tatsienense
- Tanacetum vulgare L. – common tansy, garden tansy, golden-buttons

== Gallery of species ==
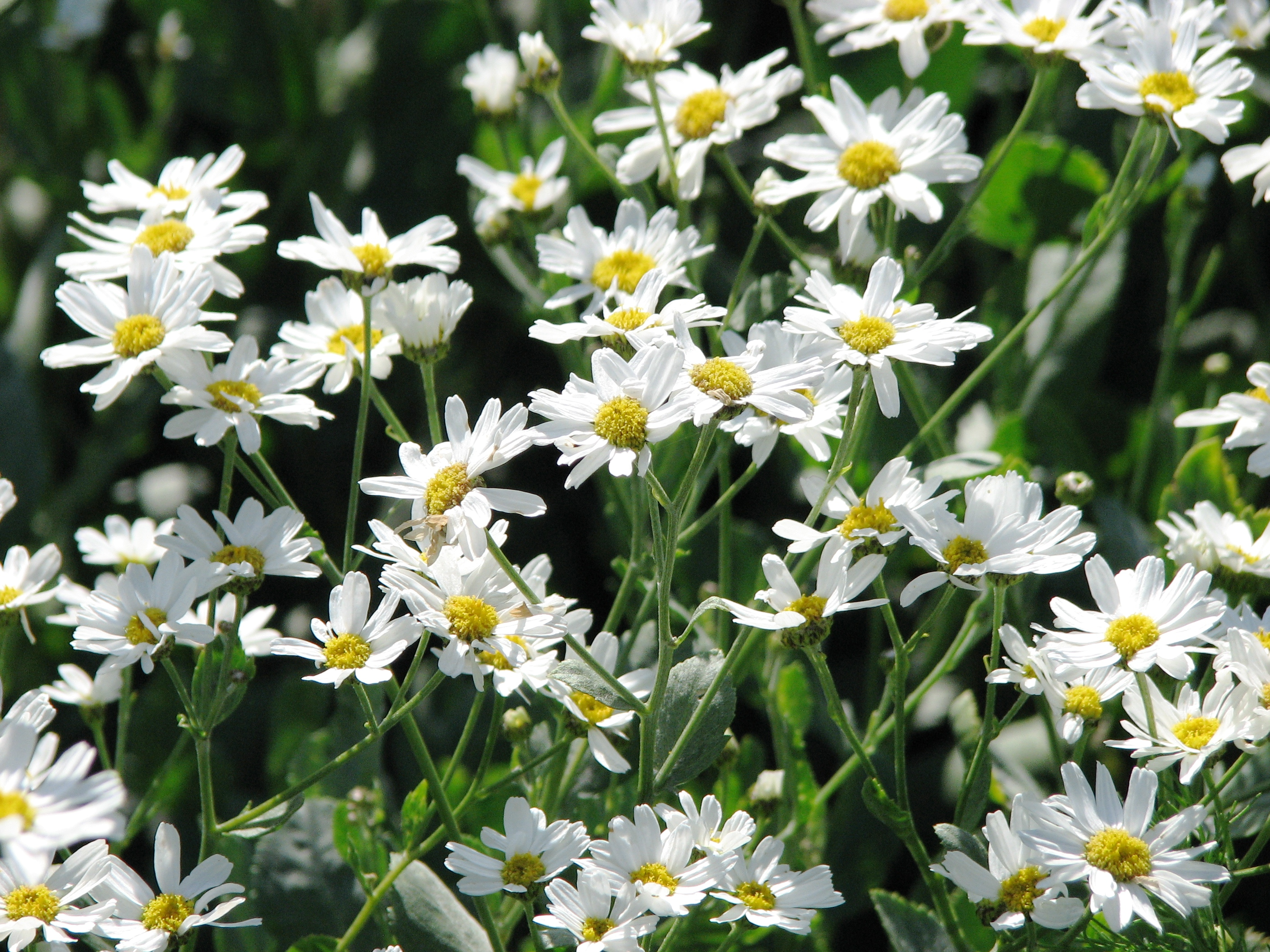
Tanacetum balsamita

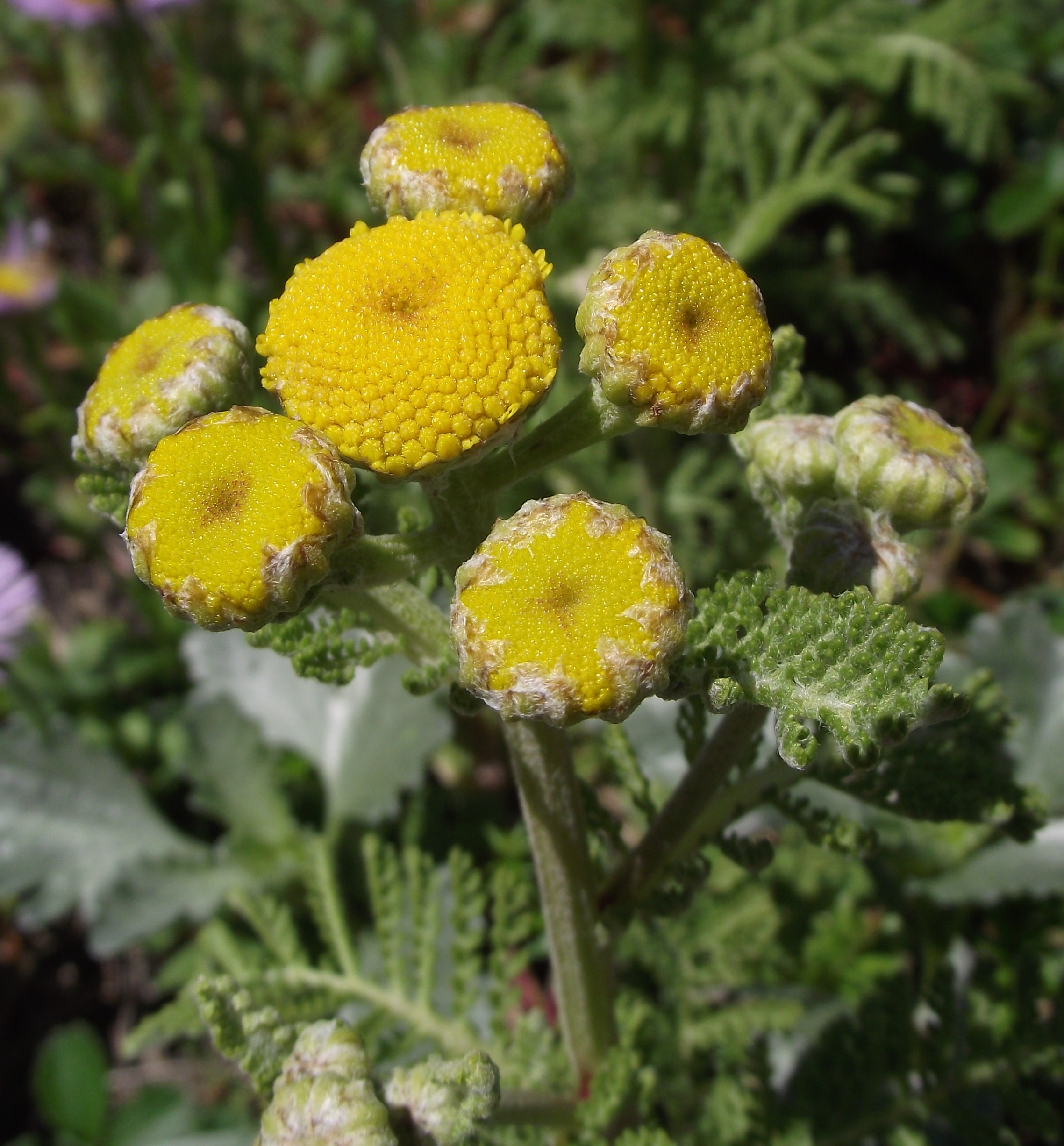
Tanacetum camphoratum

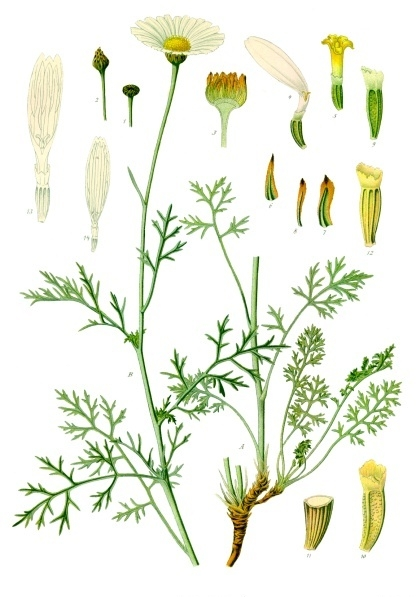
Tanacetum cinerariifolium

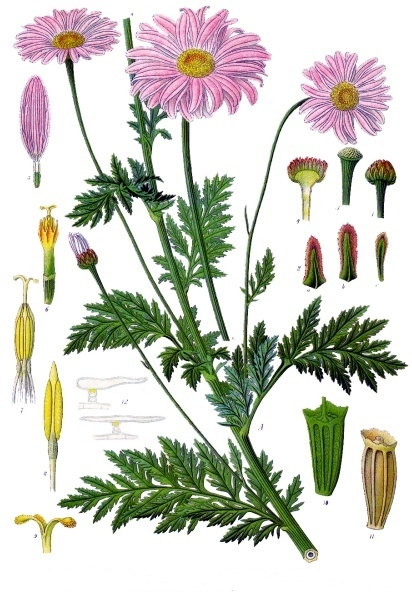
Tanacetum coccineum

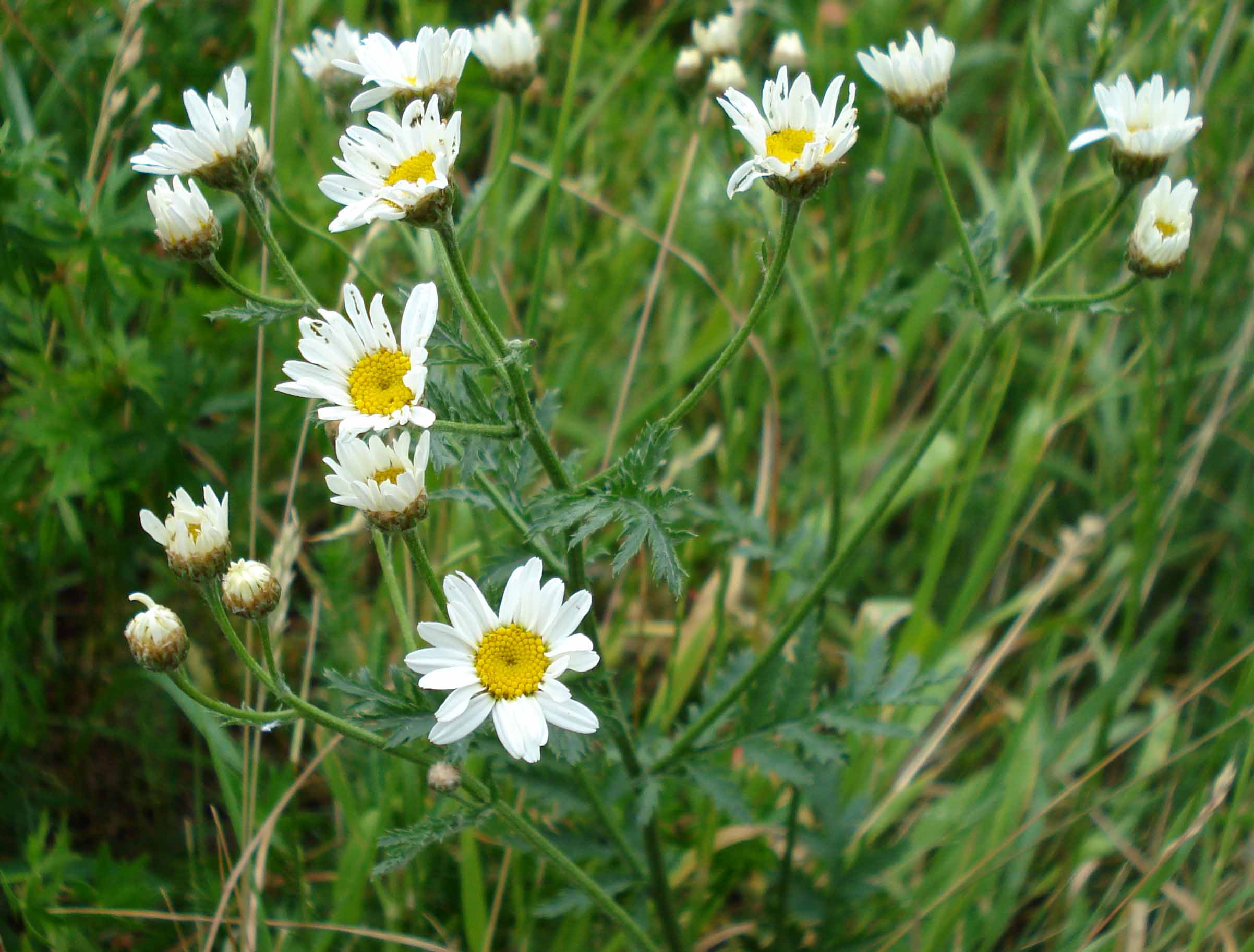
Tanacetum corymbosum

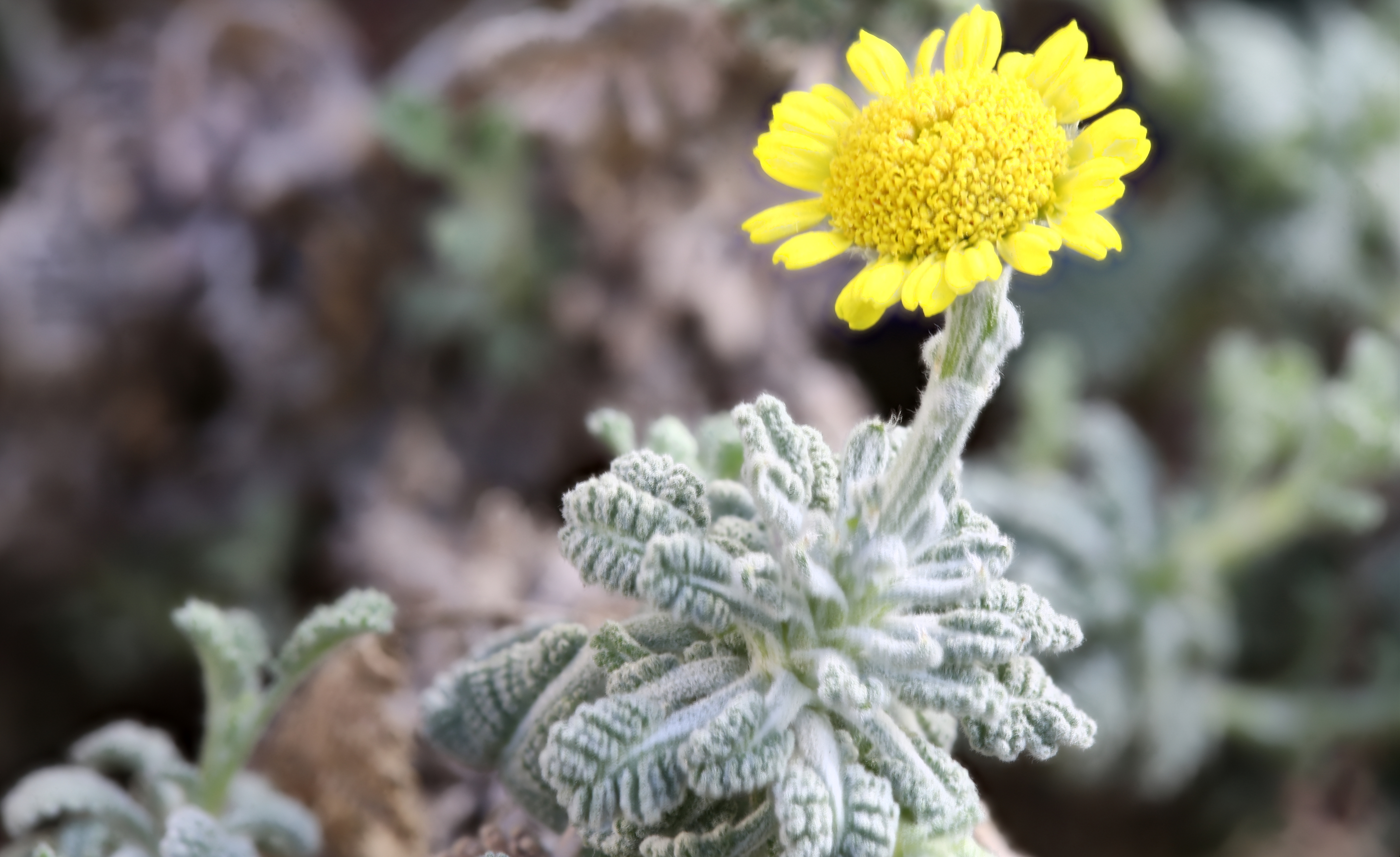
Tanacetum densum

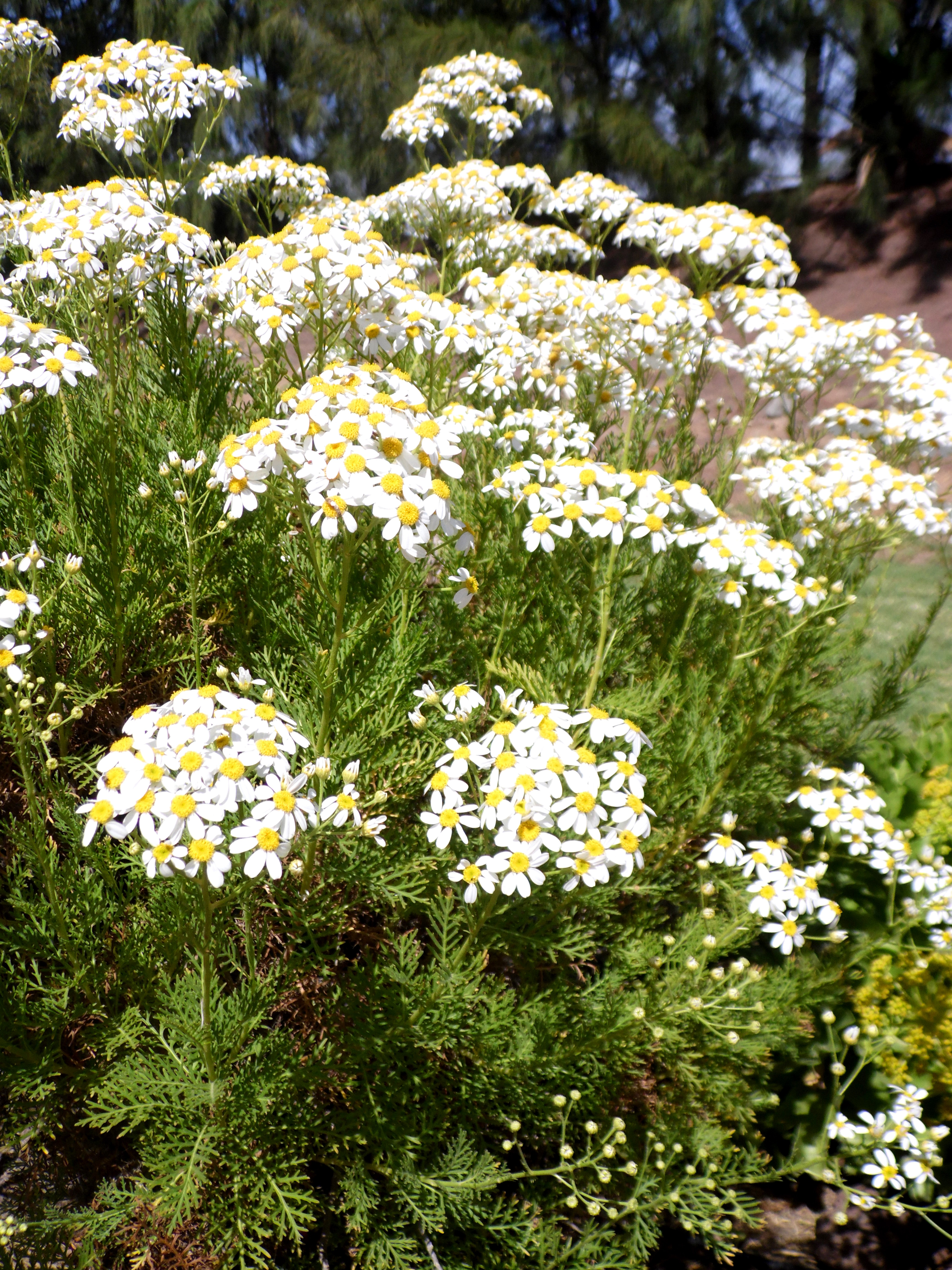
Tanacetum ferulaceum

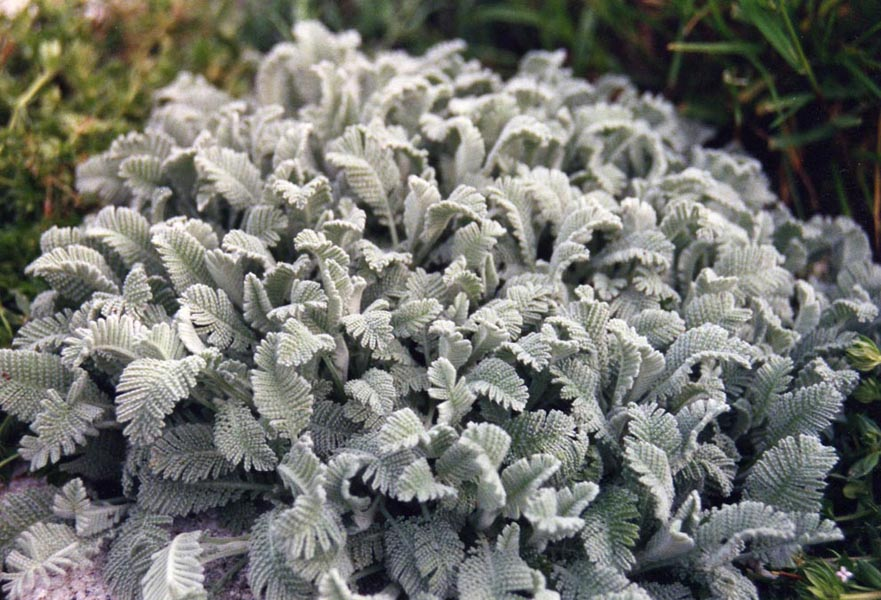
Tanacetum haradjanii

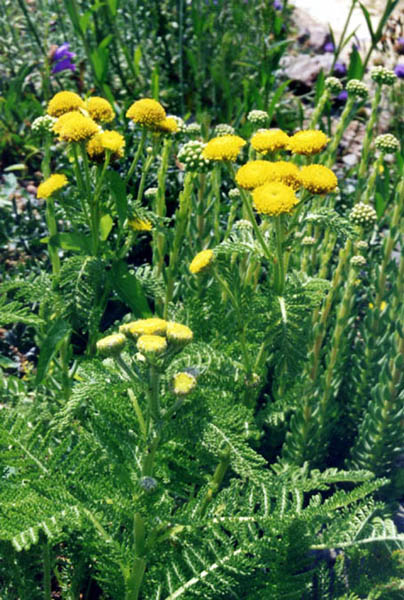
Tanacetum huronense

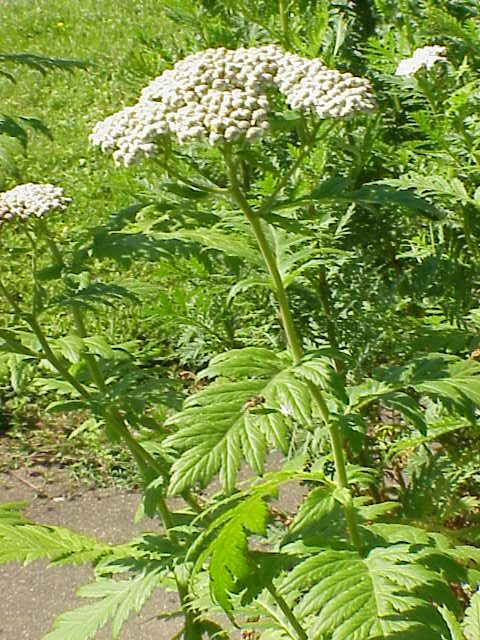
Tanacetum macrophyllum

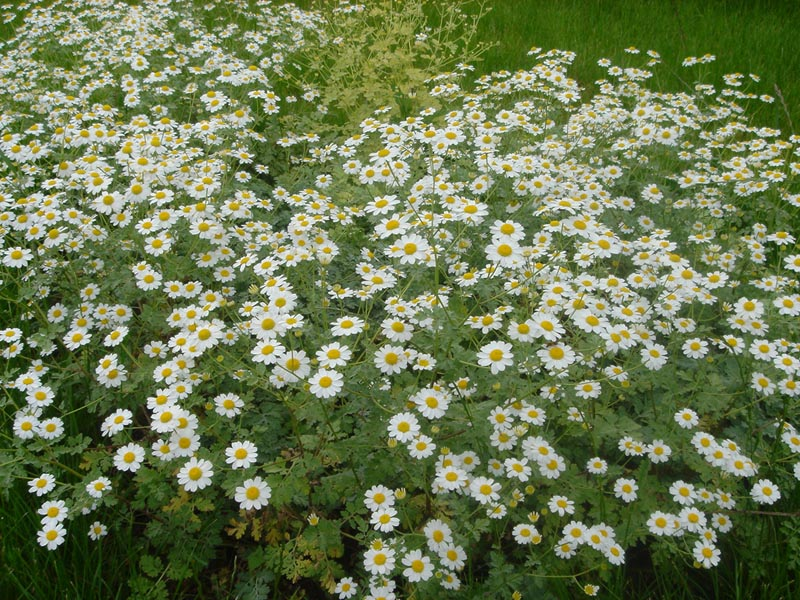
Tanacetum niveum

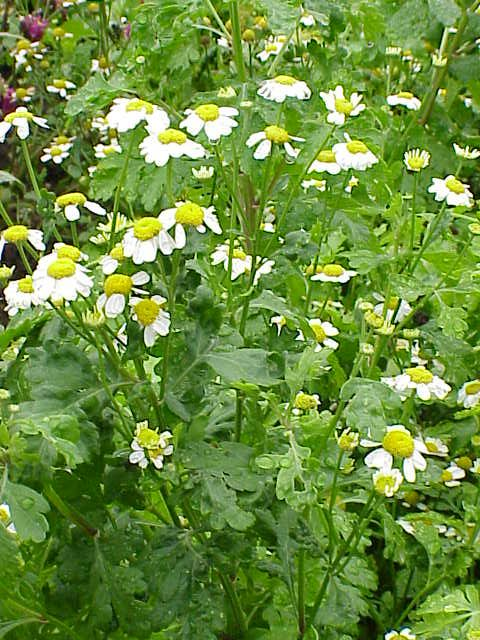
Tanacetum parthenium

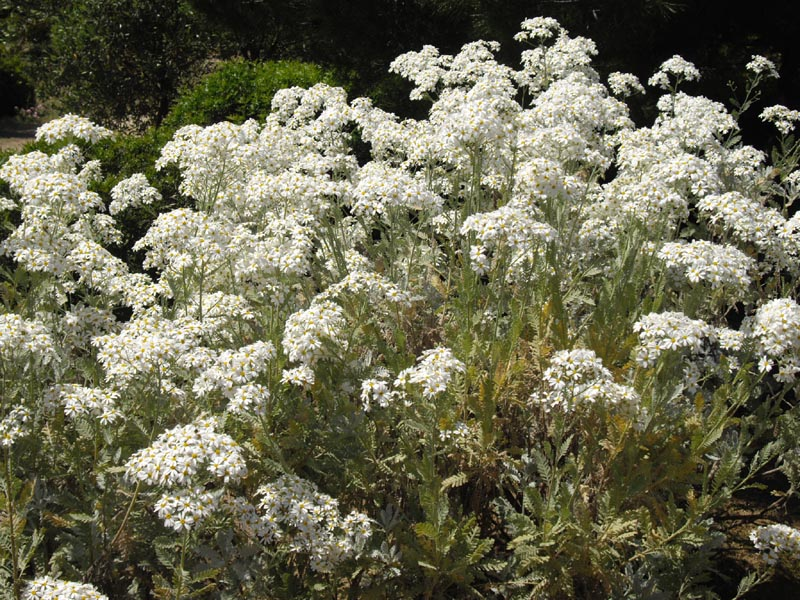
Tanacetum ptarmiciflorum

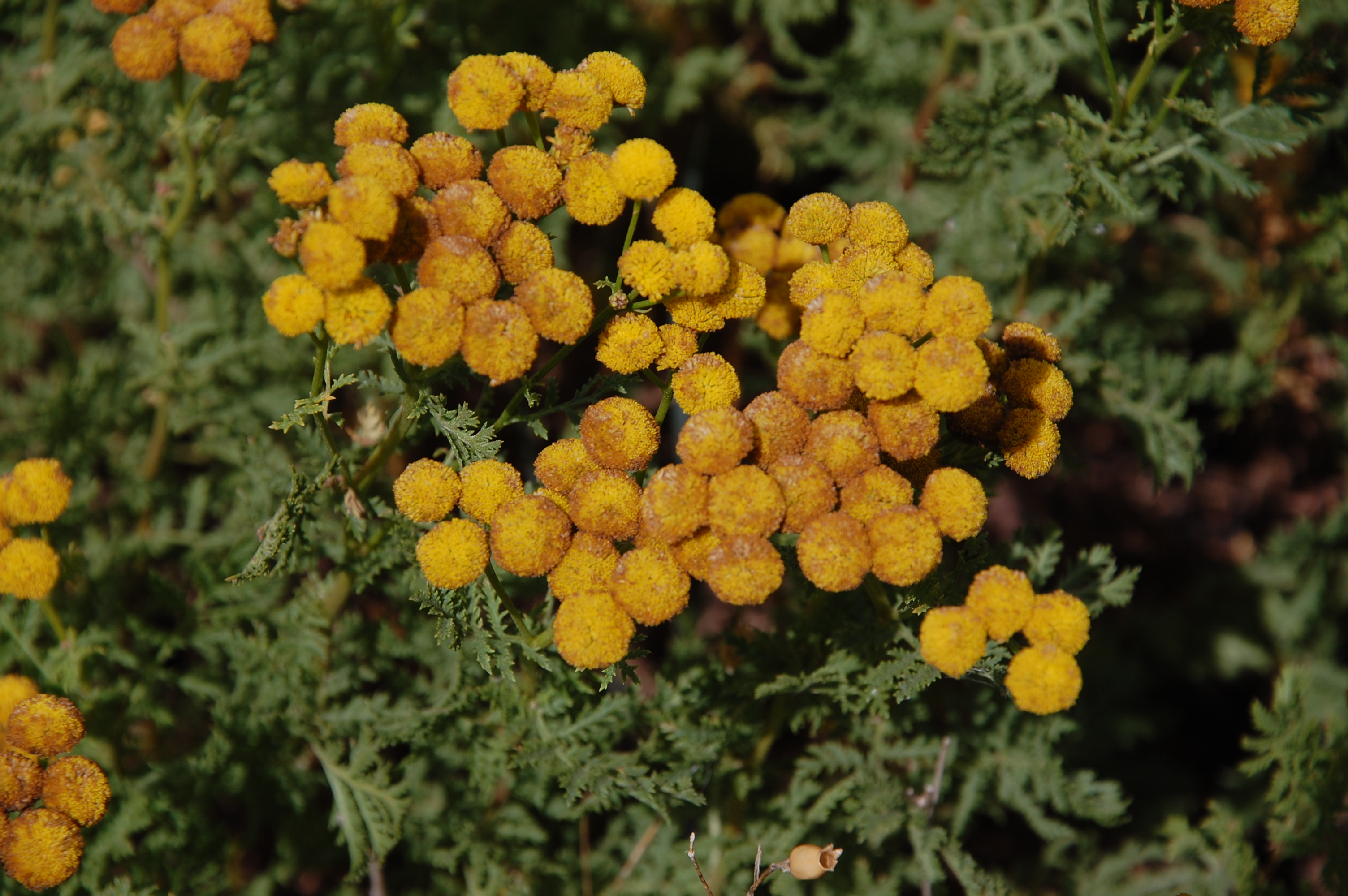
Tanacetum siculum

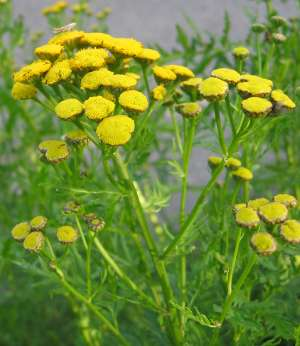
Tanacetum vulgare
