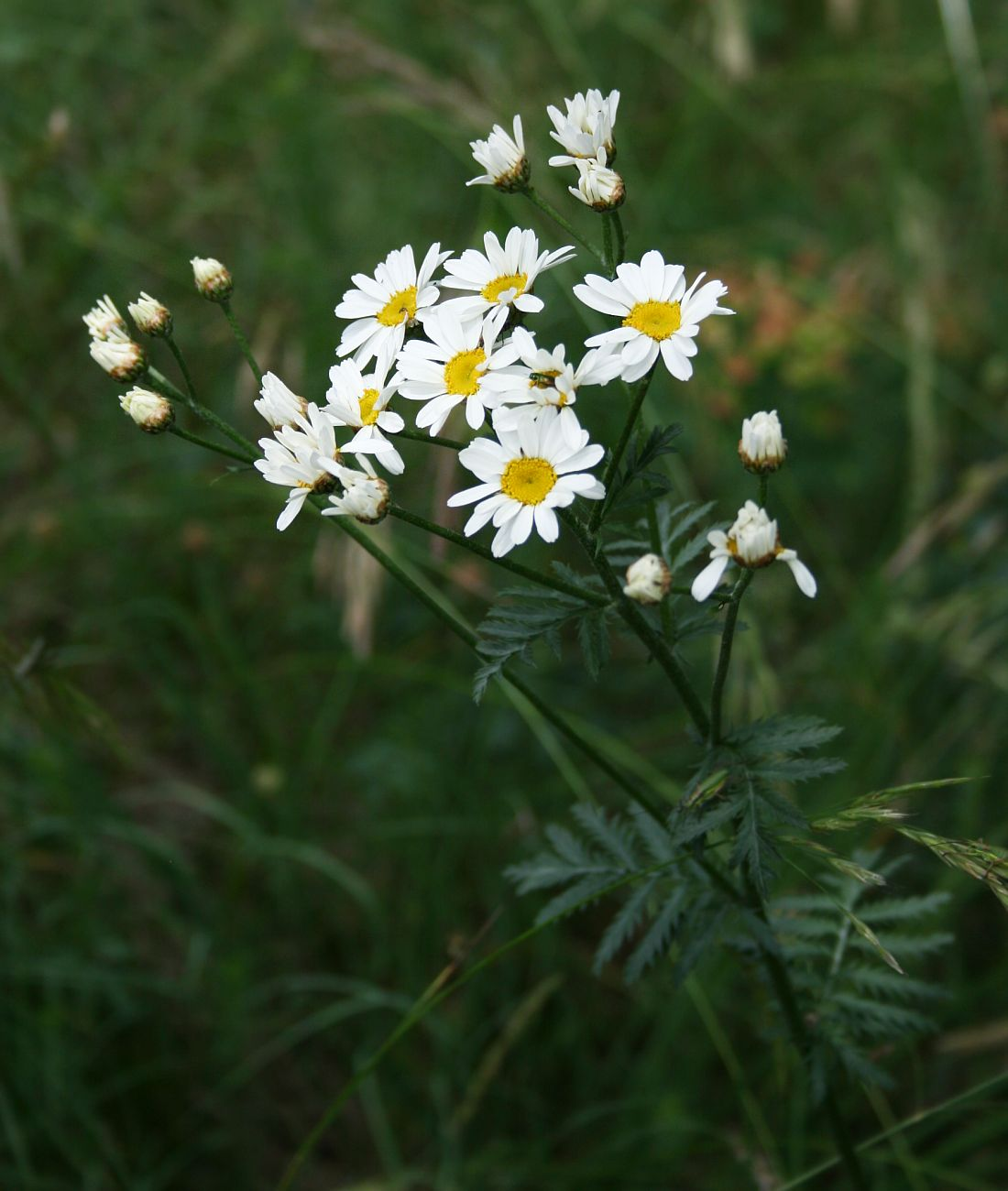

Scientific classification
- Kingdom: Plantae
- Clade: Tracheophytes
- Clade: Angiosperms
- Clade: Eudicots
- Clade: Asterids
- Order: Asterales
- Family: Asteraceae
- Genus: Tanacetum
- Species: T. corymbosum

Binomial name
- Tanacetum corymbosum (L.) Sch.Bip.

= Tanacetum corymbosum =

Species of flowering plant

Tanacetum corymbosum is a species of flowering plant belonging to the family Asteraceae.

Its native range is Europe to Western Siberia and Turkey.
