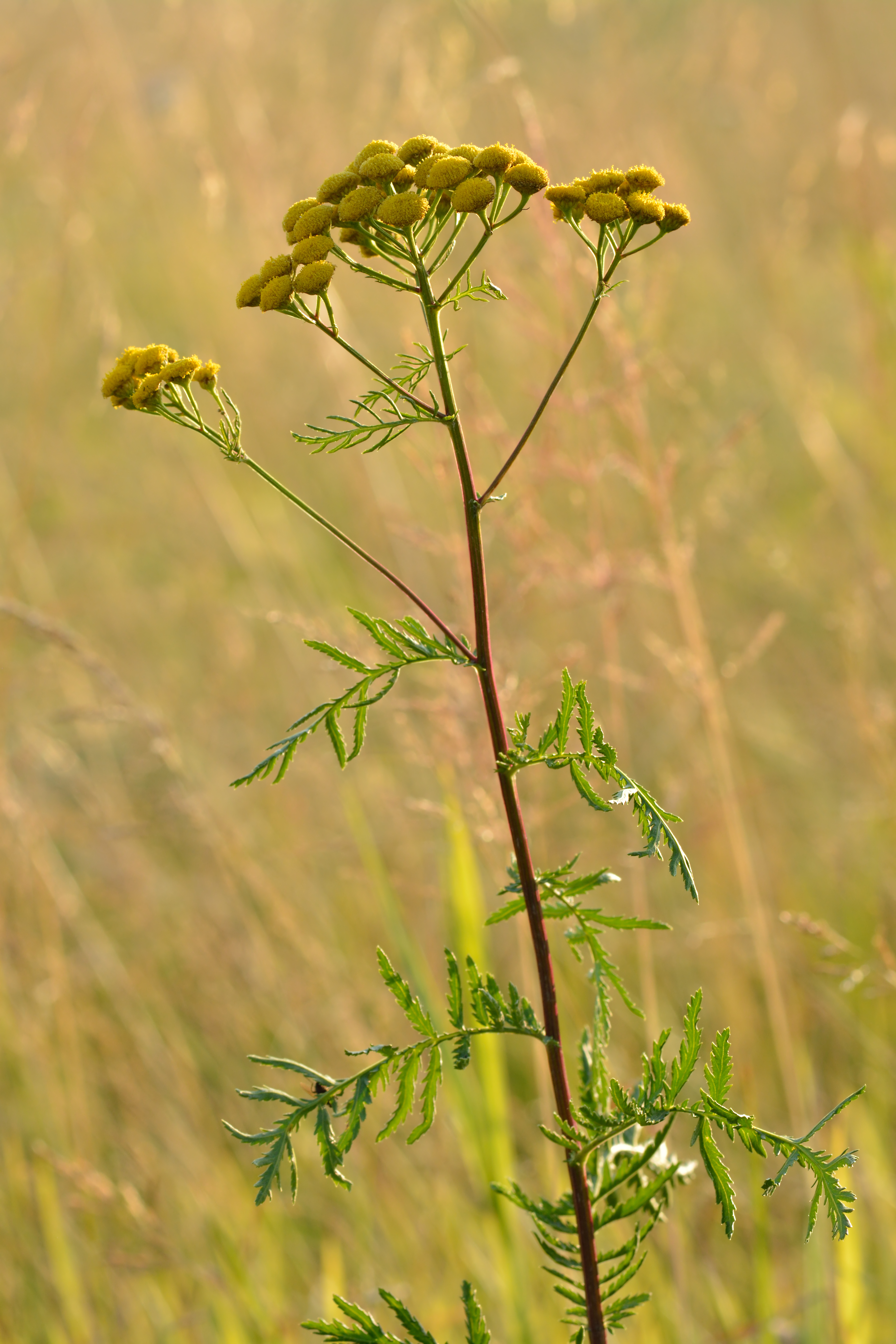

Scientific classification
- Kingdom: Plantae
- Clade: Embryophytes
- Clade: Tracheophytes
- Clade: Angiosperms
- Clade: Eudicots
- Clade: Asterids
- Order: Asterales
- Family: Asteraceae
- Genus: Tanacetum
- Species: T. vulgare

Binomial name
- Tanacetum vulgare L.

Synonyms
- Chamaemelum tanacetum (Vis.) E.H.L.Krause; Chrysanthemum asiaticum Vorosch.; Pyrethrum vulgare (L.) Boiss.; Tanacetum boreale Fisch. ex DC.; Tanacetum crispum Steud.

= Tansy =

Species of plant

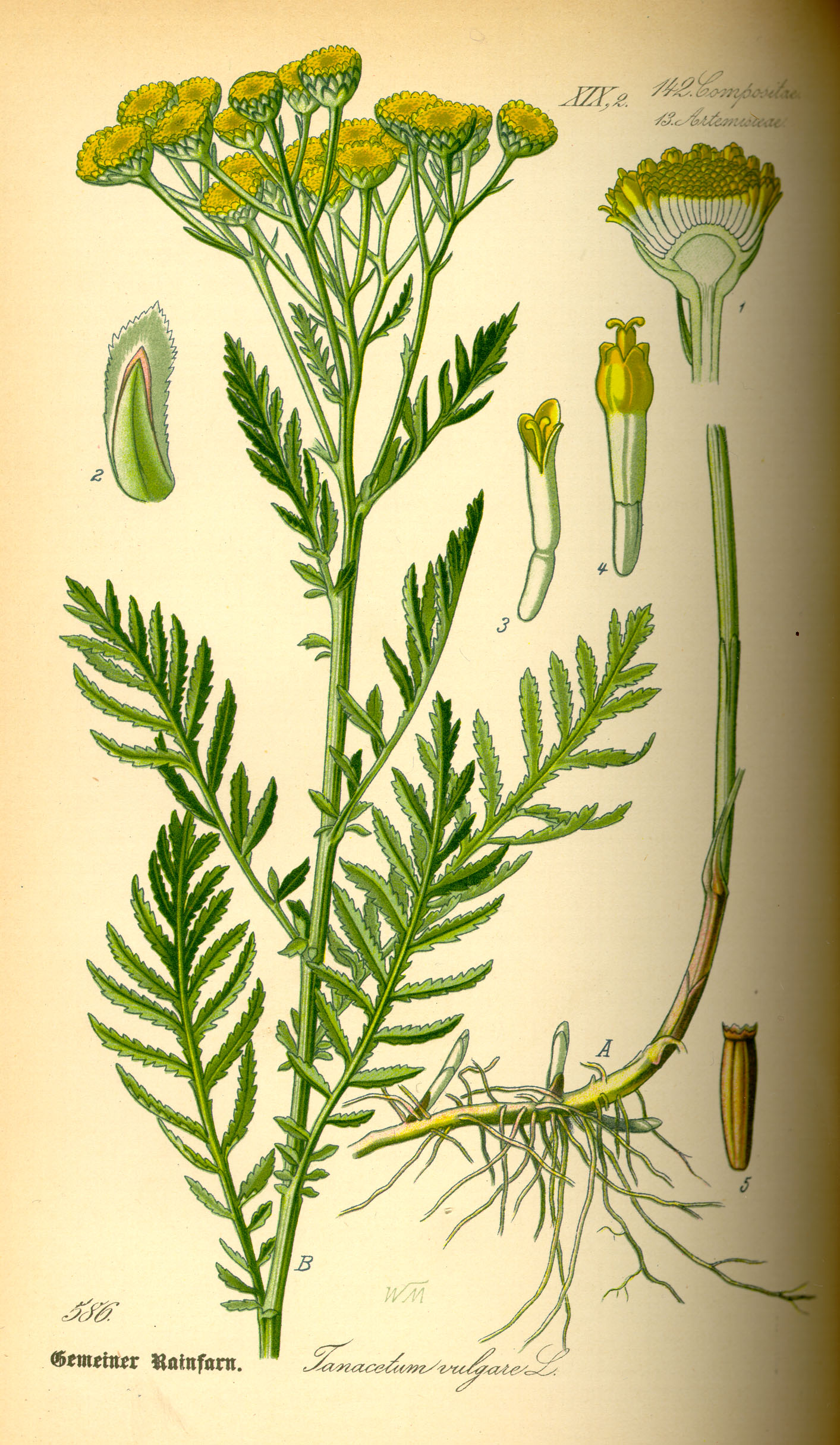
Illustration of a tansy

Tansy (Tanacetum vulgare) is a perennial, herbaceous flowering plant in the genus Tanacetum in the family Asteraceae, native to temperate Europe and Asia. It has been introduced to other parts of the world, including Australia and North and South America, and in some areas has become invasive. It is also known as common tansy, bitter buttons, cow bitter, or golden buttons. The Latin word vulgare means "common".

== Description ==
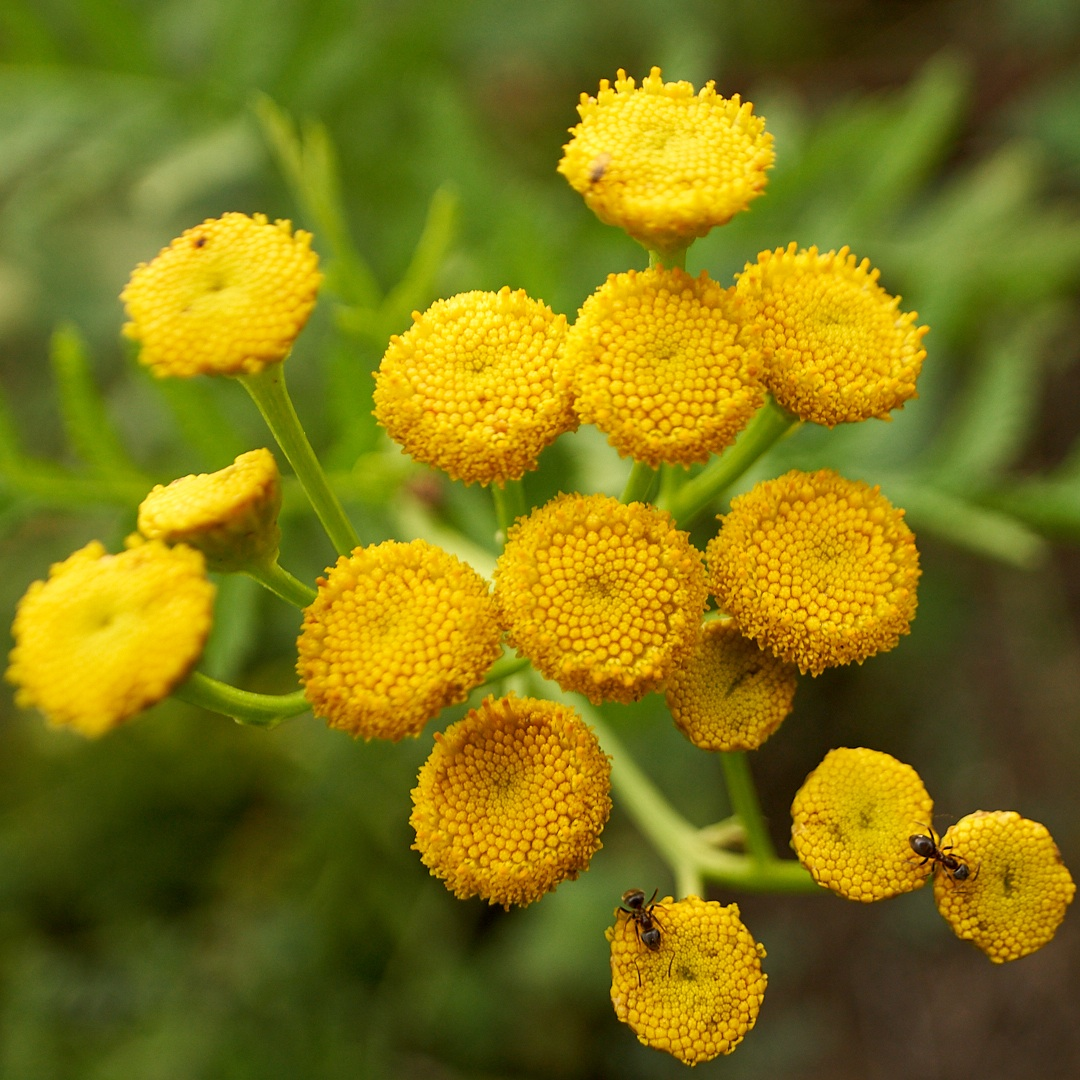
Tansy: corymb of flower heads with recognisable Fibonacci spirals

Tansy is a flowering herbaceous clump-forming plant with finely divided compound leaves and yellow, button-like flowers. It has a stout, somewhat reddish, erect stem, usually smooth, 50–150 cm (20–59 in) tall, and branching near the top. The leaves are alternate, 10–15 cm (3.9–5.9 in) long and are pinnately lobed, divided almost to the midrib into about seven pairs of segments, or lobes, which are again divided into smaller lobes having saw-toothed edges, giving the leaf a somewhat fern-like appearance. The roundish, flat-topped, button-like, yellow flower heads are produced in terminal clusters from mid-to-late summer, typically July to September in Great Britain; each 'button' flowerhead 7–12 mm diameter. The scent is similar to that of camphor with hints of rosemary. The leaves and flowers are toxic if consumed in large quantities; the volatile oil contains toxic compounds including thujone, which can cause convulsions and liver and brain damage. Some insects, notably the tansy beetle Chrysolina graminis, have resistance to the toxins and subsist almost exclusively on the plant.

== Distribution ==
Tansy is native to Eurasia; it is native in almost all parts of Europe, including Great Britain, though introduced in Iceland, Ireland, and Portugal. It is absent from Siberia and from some of the Mediterranean islands; in Asia, it is native south to Turkey, Kazakhstan, northern China, Korea, and Japan, but absent further south.

== Cultivation and use ==
The ancient Greeks may have been the first to cultivate it as a medicinal herb. In the sixteenth century it was considered to be "necessary for a garden" in England.

=== History of use ===
Tansy has a long history of use. The first historical records of its cultivation for medicinal purposes involved the ancient Greeks. In the 8th century AD it was grown in the herb gardens of Charlemagne and by Benedictine monks of the Swiss monastery of Saint Gall. Tansy was used to treat intestinal worms, rheumatism, digestive problems, fevers, sores, and to bring out measles.

During the Middle Ages and later, high doses were used to induce abortions. On the other hand, tansy was also used to help women conceive and to prevent miscarriages. In the 15th century, Christians began serving tansy with Lenten meals to commemorate the Passover bitter herbs eaten by the Israelites. Tansy was thought to have the added Lenten benefits of controlling flatulence brought on by days of eating fish and pulses and of preventing the intestinal worms believed to be caused by eating fish during Lent.

Tansy was used as a face wash and was reported to lighten and purify the skin. In the 19th century, Irish folklore suggested that bathing in a solution of tansy and salts would cure joint pain.

== Insect repellent ==
Tansy has also been used as insect repellent and in embalming. It was packed into coffins, wrapped in funeral winding sheets, and tansy wreaths were sometimes placed on the dead. Henry Dunster, the first president of Harvard University, was buried wearing a tansy wreath in a coffin packed with tansy; when the cemetery was moved in 1846 the tansy had maintained its shape and fragrance, helping to identify the president's remains. By the 19th century, tansy was used so much at New England funerals that people began to disdain it for its morbid association with death.

During the American colonial period, meat was frequently rubbed with or packed in tansy leaves to repel insects and delay spoilage. Tansy was frequently worn at that time in shoes to prevent malaria and other fevers; it has been shown, however, that some mosquito species, including Culex pipiens, take nectar from tansy flowers.

Tansy can be used as in companion planting and for biological pest control. It is planted alongside potatoes to repel the Colorado potato beetle, with one study finding tansy reduced the beetle population by 60 to 100 percent.

In England tansy is placed on window sills to repel flies; sprigs are placed in bed linen to drive away pests, and it has been used as an ant repellent.

In the 1940s, distilled tansy oil mixed with fleabane, pennyroyal and diluted alcohol was a well-known mosquito repellent; collectors were paid five cents a pound for tansy in full bloom. Research has found that tansy extracts do indeed repel mosquitoes, but not as effectively as products containing DEET. In 2008, researchers in Sweden investigated the use of tansy to repel ticks, showing a 64–72 percent repellency for each oil constituent.

== Toxicity ==
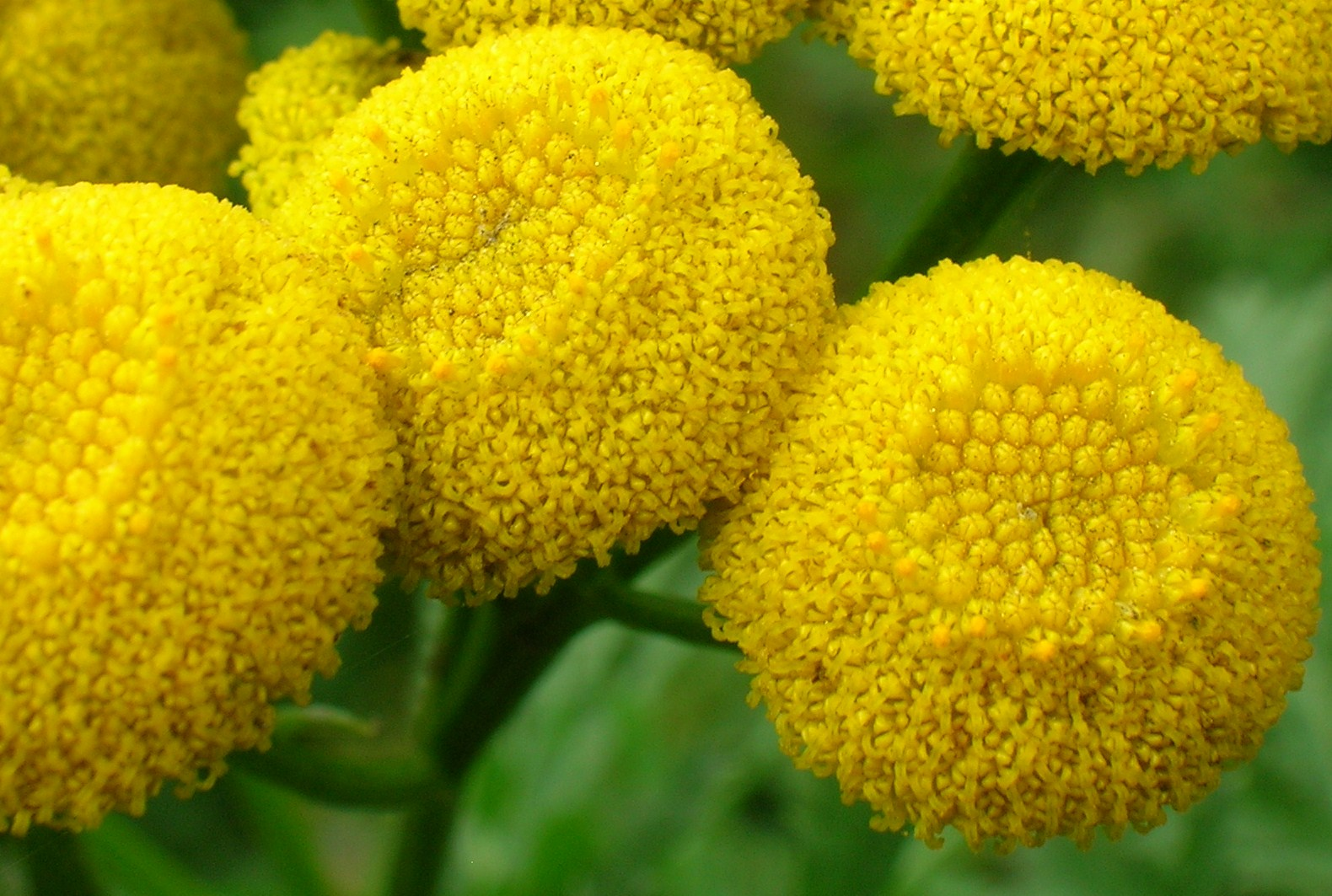
Detail of Tansy inflorescences

Many tansy species contain a volatile oil which can cause contact dermatitis in sensitive individuals. If taken internally, toxic metabolites are produced as the oil is broken down in the liver and digestive tract. It is highly toxic to internal parasites, and for centuries tansy tea has been prescribed by herbalists to expel worms. Tansy is an effective insecticide and is highly toxic to arthropods. Because it contains thujone, the U.S. FDA limits the use of tansy to alcoholic beverages, and the final product must be thujone-free. Blue tansy (Vogtia annua, syn. Tanacetum annuum) is often confused with common tansy (Tanacetum vulgare) but the former produces an essential oil that is completely different chemically as it contains no thujone and high amounts of chamazulene making the oil dark blue in colour, giving rise to its common name of Blue Tansy Oil. Despite claims by some unethical resellers of essential oils who adulterate the very expensive blue tansy oil with the much cheaper oil from Tanacetum vulgare, the oil from Tanacetum vulgare is never blue in colour as it contains no chamazulene. For this reason a high thujone oil from Tanacetum vulgare should never be referred to as "Blue Tansy" oil and any such blue oil containing significant thujone is an adulterated product.

The active components of the volatile oil include 1,8-cineole, trans-thujone, camphor and myrtenol, with the quantities and proportions of each varying seasonally and from plant to plant.

1,8-Cineole is a toxin believed to defend the plant leaves against attacks by herbivores.

== Culinary uses ==
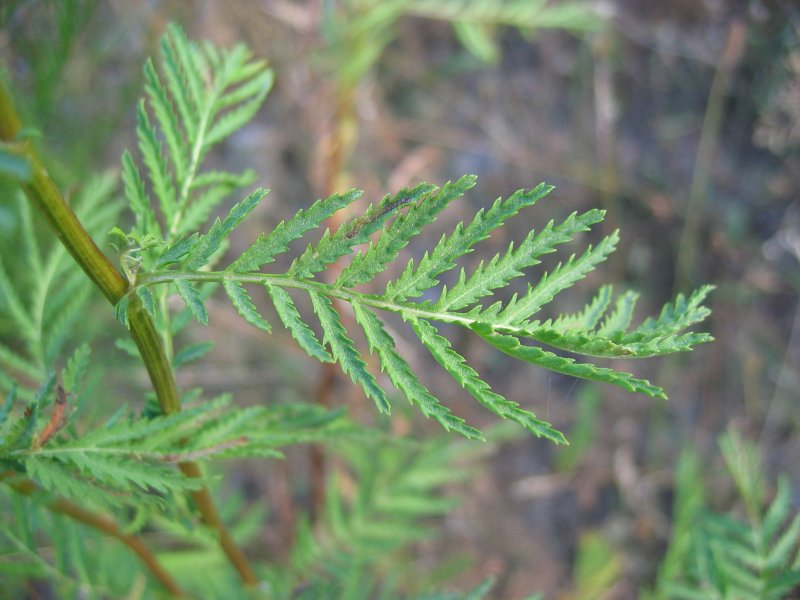
Tansy foil

Tansy was formerly used as a flavouring for puddings and omelettes, but is now almost unknown, except in Cork, where it is used in a sauce to accompany drisheens. The herbalist John Gerard (c. 1545–1612) noted that tansy was well known as "pleasant in taste", and he recommends tansy sweetmeats as "an especial thing against the gout, if every day for a certain space a reasonable quantitie thereof be eaten fasting." In Yorkshire, tansy and caraway seeds were traditionally used in biscuits served at funerals.

During the Stuart Restoration in the late 1600s, a "tansy" was a sweet omelette flavoured with tansy juice. In the BBC documentary "The Supersizers go ... Restoration", Allegra McEvedy described the flavour as "fruity, sharpness to it and then there's a sort of explosion of cool heat a bit like peppermint." However, Sue Perkins, the programme's presenter, experienced tansy toxicity.

According to liquor historian A. J. Baime, in the 19th century Tennessee whiskey magnate Jack Daniel enjoyed drinking his own whiskey with sugar and crushed tansy leaf.

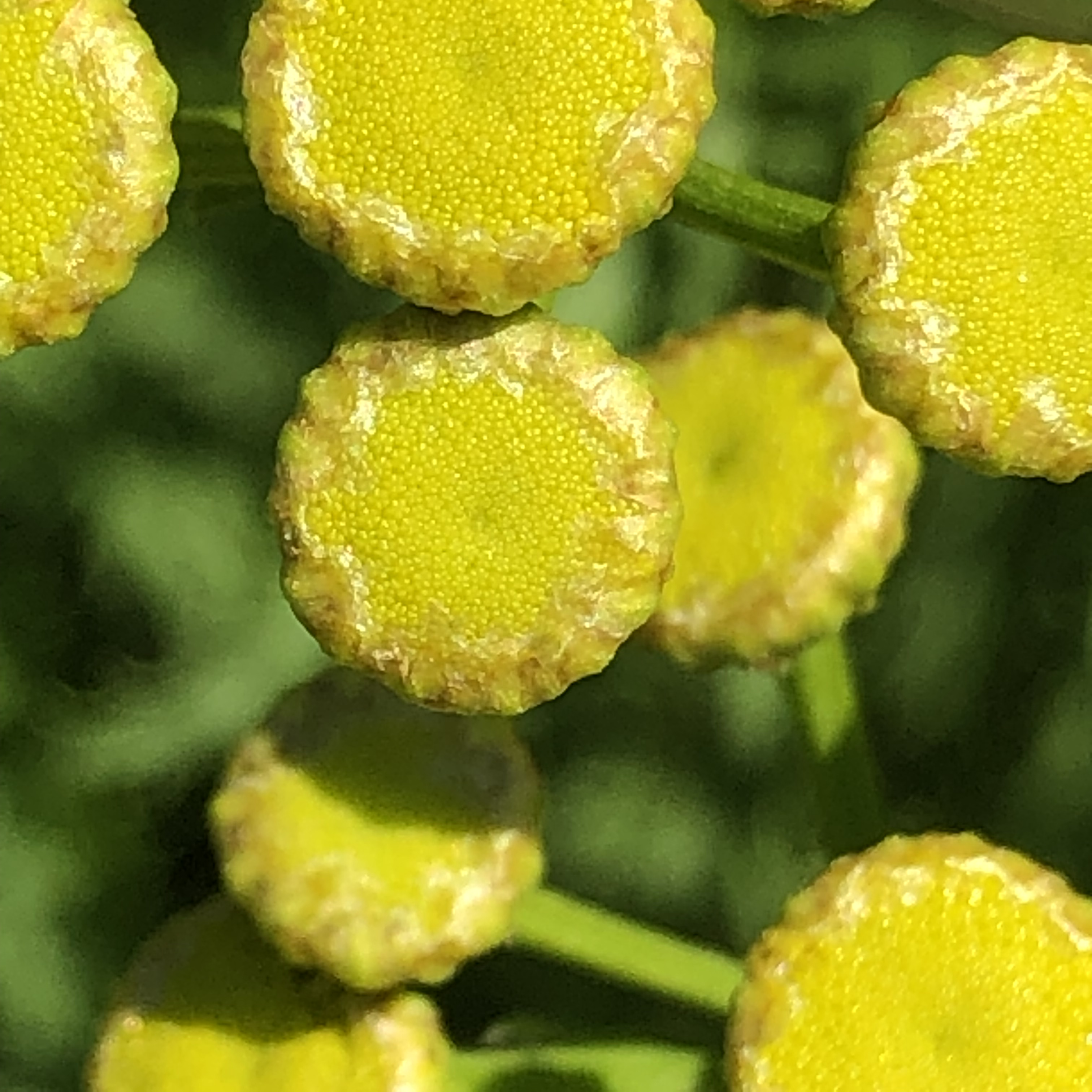
The flowers are naturally "petal-less".

In the Belgian coastal province of West Flanders small quantities of crushed dried tansy leaf were traditionally used as culinary herb to spice up pancakes and omelettes. There tansy is colloquially known as pannenkoekenkruid ("pancake herb").

It can also be used as a substitute for sage.

== Ethnomedical use ==
For many years, tansy has been used as a medicinal herb despite its toxicity. 19th-century Irish folklore suggests bathing in a solution of tansy and salt as a cure for joint pain. A bitter tea made with tansy flowers has been used for centuries as an anthelmintic to treat parasitic worm infestations, and tansy cakes were traditionally eaten during Lent because it was believed that eating fish during Lent caused intestinal worms. Various Tanacetum species are used ethnomedically to treat migraine, neuralgia and rheumatism and as anthelmintics. Traditionally, tansy was often used for its emmenagogue effects to bring on menstruation or end an unwanted pregnancy, and pregnant women are advised to not use this herb.

=== Among Native Americans ===
The Cherokee use an infusion of the plant for backache, use the plant as a tonic, and wear it around the waist and in shoes to prevent miscarriages. The Cheyenne use an infusion of the pulverised leaves and blossoms for dizziness and weakness.

== Other uses ==
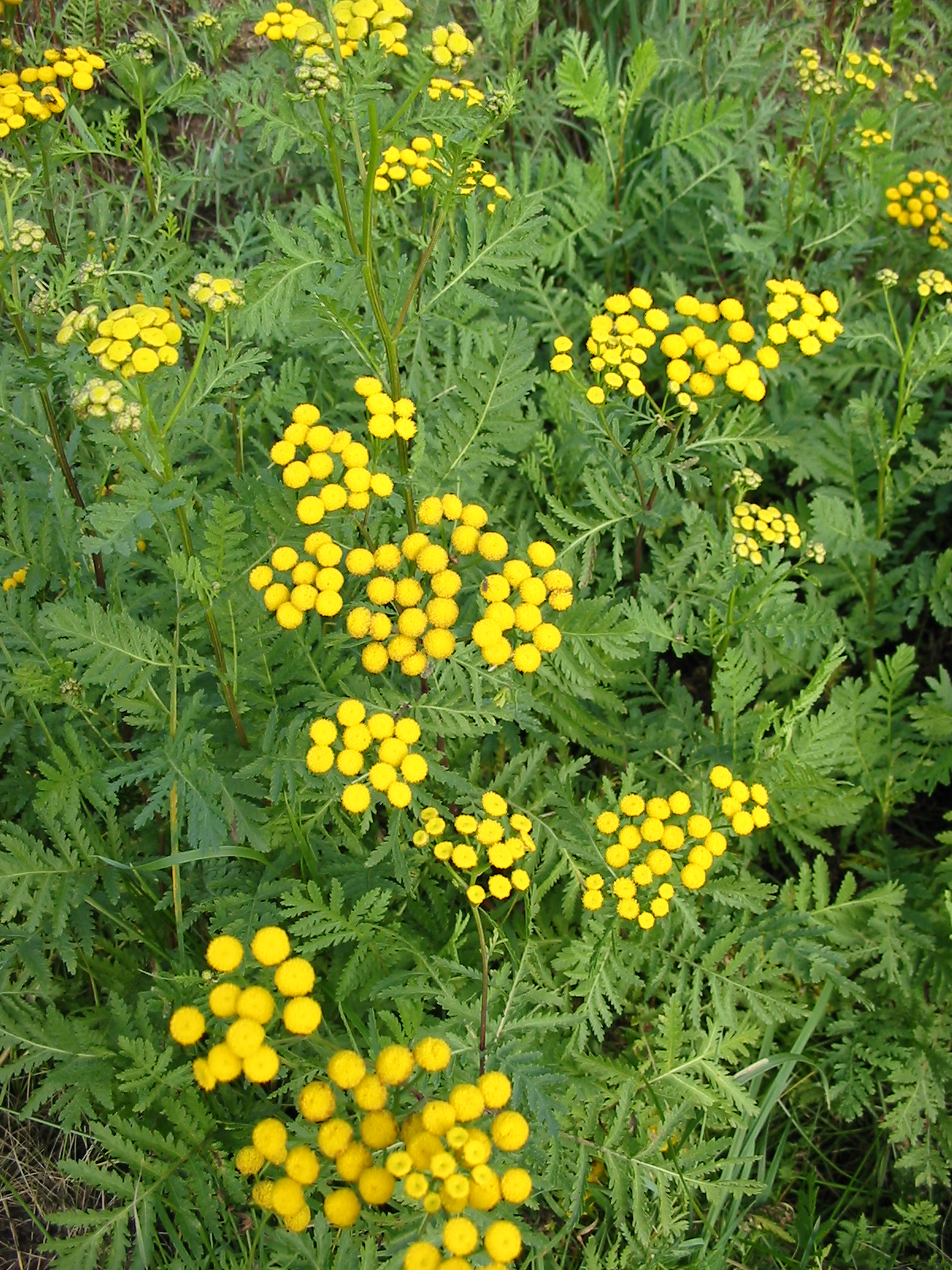
Tansy

Some traditional dyers use tansy to produce a golden-yellow colour. The yellow flowers are dried for use in floral arrangements.

Tansy is also used as a companion plant, especially with cucurbits like cucumbers and squash, or with roses or berries. It is thought to repel insects.

Dried tansy is used by some beekeepers as fuel in a bee smoker.

== See also ==
- Common ragwort (Senecio jacobaea) which in some regions is called "tansy ragwort"
- Silverweed (Potentilla anserina) a flowering plant once known as "wild tansy"
- List of companion plants
