= Center for Advancing Electronics Dresden =

Center for Advancing Electronics Dresden (cfaed)
- Established: 2012
- Mission: investigation of new technologies for electronic information processing
- Focus: interdisciplinary research and promotion of early-career researchers and gender balance
- Chair: Prof. Dr.-Ing. Gerhard Fettweis
- Staff: 300 scientists, 60 investigators
- Key people: Prof. Dr.-Ing. Gerhard Fettweis, Prof. Dr. Karl Leo, Dr. Uta Schneider, Prof. Jeronimo Castrillon, Prof. Markus Krötzsch, Prof. Xinliang Feng, Prof. Stefan Mannsfeld, Prof. Akash Kumar, Prof. Thomas Mikolajick, Prof. Michael Schröter, Prof. Stefan Diez, Prof. Andreas Richter, Prof. Thorsten Strufe, Prof. Marino Zerial
- Budget: € 34 million
- Address: Würzburger Str. 46
- Location: Dresden, Germany
- Website: https://cfaed.tu-dresden.de/

The Center for Advancing Electronics Dresden (cfaed) of the Technische Universität Dresden is part of the Excellence Initiative of German universities. The cluster of excellence for microelectronics is funded from 2012 to 2017 by the German Research Community (DFG) and unites about 60 Investigators and their teams from 11 institutions to act jointly towards reaching the Cluster's ambitious aims. The coordinator is Prof. Dr.-Ing. Gerhard Fettweis, Chair of Mobile Communication Systems. The cluster brings together the teams from two universities and several research institutes in Saxony: Technische Universität Dresden, Technische Universität Chemnitz, Helmholtz-Zentrum Dresden-Rossendorf (HZDR), Leibniz Institute for Polymer Research Dresden e.V. (IPF), Leibniz Institute for Solid State and Materials Research Dresden (IFW), Max Planck Institute of Molecular Cell Biology and Genetics (MPI-CBG), Max Planck Institute for the Physics of Complex Systems (MPI-PKS), Nanoelectronics Materials Laboratory gGmbH (NaMLab), Fraunhofer Institute for Electronic Nano Systems (Fraunhofer ENAS), Fraunhofer Institute of Ceramic Technologies and Systems (Fraunhofer IKTS) and Kurt Schwabe Institute for Measuring and Sensor Technology Meinsberg e.V. (KSI). About 300 scientists from more than 20 different countries are working in nine research paths to investigate completely new technologies for electronic information processing which overcome the limits of today's predominant CMOS technology.

== Position and institutional building ==
One of the scientific buildings, as well as the organizational headquarters, of the cfaed is situated in Dresden-Plauen, Würzburger Straße 46. In May 2015, construction works for the new cfaed building commenced at the campus of TU Dresden. The building is due for completion in late 2017 and it will host new laboratories, seminar rooms, and offices.

== History ==
The initial proposal for cfaed as a Cluster of Excellence was submitted to the DFG in August 2011. On July 15, 2012, the Center for Advancing Electronics Dresden (cfaed) achieved the status Cluster of Excellence in the second funding round of the German government's Excellence Initiative. During the five-year funding period, which started in November 2012, the cluster receives approximately €34 million of subsidies. The first funding phase will run until October 2017.

On April 3 cfaed submitted one of eight draft proposals for "TUD Clusters of Excellence" new funding line. On 28 September 2017, TUD will know how many of its draft proposals will be invited to be submitted as full applications. A year later, on 27 September 2018, it will be announced which Clusters of Excellence were successful. These will then be funded, for an initial period of seven years, from 2019 onwards. If at least two TUD-Clusters of Excellence are selected, TUD shall be eligible to apply for the second funding line “University of Excellence”, for which the submission of applications is scheduled for mid-December 2018.

== Research focus and program ==
The new technologies for electronic information processing are inspired by innovative materials such as silicon nanowires, carbon nanotubes or polymers or based on completely new conceptions such as the chemical chip or circuit fabrication methods by self-assembling structures e.g. DNA-Origami. The orchestration of these new devices into heterogeneous information processing systems with focus on their resilience and energy-efficiency is also part of cfaed's research program. Furthermore, biological communication systems are analyzed with the aim to use inspirations of the nature for technical challenges. The research is structurally supported and fostered by strong leadership, three Strategic Professors, one open-topic professor, a dedicated building, the status as Central Scientific Institution, and integration into the DRESDEN-Concept.

Currently, a team of cfaed scientists is involved in developing the ‘Fifth Generation’ of mobile communications. By extremely low latency, massive security and resilience of data transmission, completely new applications might become possible. Examples are cooperative traffic coordination systems, robotic-aided tele-surgery or innovative e-learning methods.

To achieve its goals, the Cluster actively integrates discovery-driven natural sciences and innovation-driven engineering. In a comprehensive approach, the research spans from materials to heterogeneous information processing systems and vice versa. cfaed refers to its research areas as "Research Paths" to highlight exploratory dynamic character in search of breakthroughs. To maximize success and enable fruitful cross-fertilization, the Cluster follows a ‘more-shots-on-goal’ approach by pursuing multiple, interconnected Research Paths reflecting the distinguished research competence of Technische Universität Dresden (TUD) and its partners in cfaed. cfaed's research is organized within 9 Research Paths, clustered in the following areas: Materials-inspired Paths (Silicon Nanowire Path, Carbon Path, Organic/Polymer Path, Biomolecular-Assembled Circuits Path and Chemical Information Processing Path (CIP)), System-oriented Paths (Orchestration Path, Resilience Path and DGF CRC 912) and one ‘Discovery Path' (Biological System Path (Bio)).

=== Materials-inspired paths ===
==== Silicon Nanowire Path ====
Path Leader: Prof. Dr.-Ing. Thomas Mikolajick; Path Co-Leader: Prof. Dr. Gianaurelio Cuniberti

Silicon is being investigated for its very beneficial electronic properties and because silicon nanowires can be configured to change transistors between p- and n-type dynamically. The design of novel and fault tolerant computing algorithms that make use of transistors‘ multi-functionality is investigated and silicon nanowires are explored as a selective sensor platform for biomolecules. In 2015, a flexible lightweight diagnostic platform was realized that enables cost efficient high-volume delivery to medical institutions worldwide.

==== Carbon Path ====
Path Leader: Prof. Dr.-Ing. habil. Michael Schröter; Path Co-Leader: Prof. Dr. Habil. Gotthard Seifert

Carbon nanotubes (CNTs) are being investigated for use in electronics for wireless communication systems. The main emphasis is put onto the profound theoretical understanding as well as wafer-scale fabrication of the CNT-based electronics. Very recently, the first operation in the application-specific GHz regime has been shown.

==== Organic/Polymer Path ====
Path Leader: Prof. Dr. Stefan Mannsfeld; Path Co-Leader: Dr. habil. Francesca Moresco

The goal of the Organic and Polymer Path is to overcome some of the major limitations of organic materials and devices and thereby identifying the route towards new organic information processing systems. Research highlights include papers on the controlled transport of single atoms by an electronically driven molecular nanostructure, a new concept for organic transistors with doped layers, and vertical organic permeable base transistors.

==== Biomolecular-Assembled Circuits Path (BAC) ====
Path Leader: Prof. Dr. Stefan Diez; Path Co-Leader: Prof. Dr.-Ing. habil Michael Mertig

Nanostructures made from DNA allow to arrange functional materials in a scalable way to create self-assembled electronic, optoelectronic and nanophotonic devices that complement established silicon-based technologies. Recent achievements include the nanometer-precise placement of metallic nanoparticles for photonic waveguides and antennas as well as the controlled growth of metallic nanowires in DNA molds.

==== Chemical Information Processing Path (CIP) ====
Path Leader: Prof. Dr.-Ing. Andreas Richter; Path Co-Leader: Prof. Dr. habil. Brigitte Voit

The unconventional approach lays the foundation of transistor-based microfluidics for processing chemicals as information carriers. To reach this goal in the near future, two basic types of chemofluidic transistors have been developed. Current research focuses on a library of basic circuit technology. So far, chemofluidic oscillators and logic gates are demonstrated.

=== System-Oriented Paths ===
==== Orchestration Path ====
Path Leader: Prof. Dr.-Ing. Jerónimo Castrillón; Path Co-Leader: Prof. Dr.-Ing. habil. Jochen Fröhlich

This path prepares the rapid and efficient implementation of heterogeneous systems by addressing adaption inflexibilities of current hard-and software designs. The aim is the automatic adaption of applications and the underlying systems software to new heterogeneous CMOS and augmented CMOS systems. Recent achievements have been made on all layers of the stack reaching from the hardware layer up to the application layer.

==== Resilience Path ====
Path Leader: Prof. Dr.-Ing. Thorsten Strufe; Path Co-Leader: Prof. Dr.-Ing. Frank H. P. Fitzek

The goal of this Path is to achieve the resilience of networked systems, focusing on flexible, application-specific, and adaptive resilience mechanisms. Reliable information processing with unreliable and adjustable components is being researched, taking into account the projected heterogeneity of future systems and the fault characteristics of new materials-inspired technologies. The main achievements are reflected in a high number of publications at top-tier conferences (e.g. INFOCOM, NSDI, ICDCS) and best paper awards (e.g. DSN, USENIX, ACM hat).

==== DFG CRC 912 „HAEC - Highly Adaptive Energy-Efficient Computing“ ====
Speaker: Prof. Dr.-Ing. Dr. h. c. Gerhard Fettweis

HAEC aims at enabling integrated hardware/software system solutions for distributed networked applications to be optimized for high adaptivity and energy efficiency during design as well as deployment, without compromising in performance. During Phase I (years 1–4), single technology demonstrators have been developed to illustrate and verify the achieved research results. A second funding phase was granted until 2019.

=== Discovery Path ===
==== Biological System Path (Bio) ====
Path Leader: Prof. Dr. Marino Zerial; Path Co-Leader: Prof. Dr. Ivo F. Sbalzarini

This Path studies emergent behavior and information processing in biological systems and identifies principles that underlie biological function and could be beneficial for engineering applications. Initial achievements of the Path are: (I) A fundamental understanding of how cells synchronize their internal chemical clocks over communications lines with a time delay that exceeds the oscillation period of the clock. (II) A categorization and understanding of how nature addresses complex high-dimensional optimization problems. (III) A basic understanding of how cells take decisions in the face of noise and uncertainty.

== Selected achievements ==
- Nanowire Sensors: Light Weight and Flexible High-Performance Diagnostic Platform (DOI: 10.1002/adhm.201570057)
- World's First Universal Transistors (DOI: 10.1002/adhm.20150012)
- Hybrid Nanomembrane Superlattices for Thermoelectric Applications (DOI: 10.1021/nl404827j)
- From Transistor Physics to Real World Applications – a Multi-Scale Approach (DOIs: 10.1007/s10825-014-0588-6; 10.1109/TNANO.2015.2397696)
- Technology Development for Analog High Frequency Carbon Nanotube Transistors
- CNT Sorting: Semiconducting Enrichment of sc-SWCNTs (DOI: 10.1002/pssa.201431771)
- Organic Inversion Field Effect Transistor (DOI: 10.1038/ncomms3775)
- Organic Permeable Base Transistor (OPBT) (DOIs: 10.1002/adma.201502788; 10.1063/1.4927478)
- Polymeric Electronics: Fully Printed All-Polymer Ring Oscillator
- World's First Parallel Computer Based on Biomolecular Motors (DOI: 10.1073/pnas.1510825113)
- High Frequency Characterization of DNA Structures (DOI: 10.1109/MMS.2015.7375461)
- Towards Electronic Nanodevices by Arranging Conjugated Polymers on DNA Origami (DOI: 10.1002/pssa.201431931)
- Towards DNA-Based Plasmonic Waveguides (DOI: 10.1021/acs.nanolett.6b00381)
- Chemical Logic Circuits (DOI: 10.1021/acs.jcim.5b00324)
- Fluidic Microchemomechanical Integrated Circuits Processing Chemical Information (DOI: 10.1039/C2LC40617A)
- Microkernel-Based System for Heterogeneous Manycores (DOI: 10.1145/2872362.2872371)
- NoC Level: Ultra Low Power Transceiver (DOI: 10.1109/JSSC.2014.2381537)
- The Tomahawk Platform: A Heterogeneous Multi-Processor System-on-Chip (MPSoC) ´(DOIs: 10.1109/ISSCC.2014.6757394; 10.1145/2517087)
- Delta-Encoding: Practical Encoded Processing (DOI: 10.1109/SRDS.2014.62)
- Resilient Software Systems (DOIs: 10.1145/2901318.2901339; 10.1145/2872427.2883026)
- Maximum Rate of Reliable Communication on Mobile Radio Channels (DOI: 10.1109/TIT.2014.2339820)
- Delay-Induced Self-Organized Synchronization in Electronic Networks (DOIs: 10.1088/1367-2630/16/11/113009; 10.1109/ICC.2015.7248572)
- Organic–inorganic Heterostructures with Programmable Electronic Properties (doi:10.1038/ncomms14767)
- Block Copolymer Micellization as a Protection Strategy for DNA Origami (doi:10.1002/anie.201608873)
- Imaging the electronic structure of on-surface generated hexacene (doi:10.1039/C6CC09327B)
- Absorption Tails of Donor:C60 Blends Provide Insight into Thermally Activated Charge-Transfer Processes and Polaron Relaxation (doi:10.1021/jacs.6b12857)
- Enabling Energy Efficiency and Polarity Control in Germanium Nanowire Transistors by Individually Gated Nanojunctions (doi:10.1021/acsnano.6b07531)
- Load Response of the Flagellar Beat (doi:10.1103/PhysRevLett.117.258101)
