= Pyrethrin II =

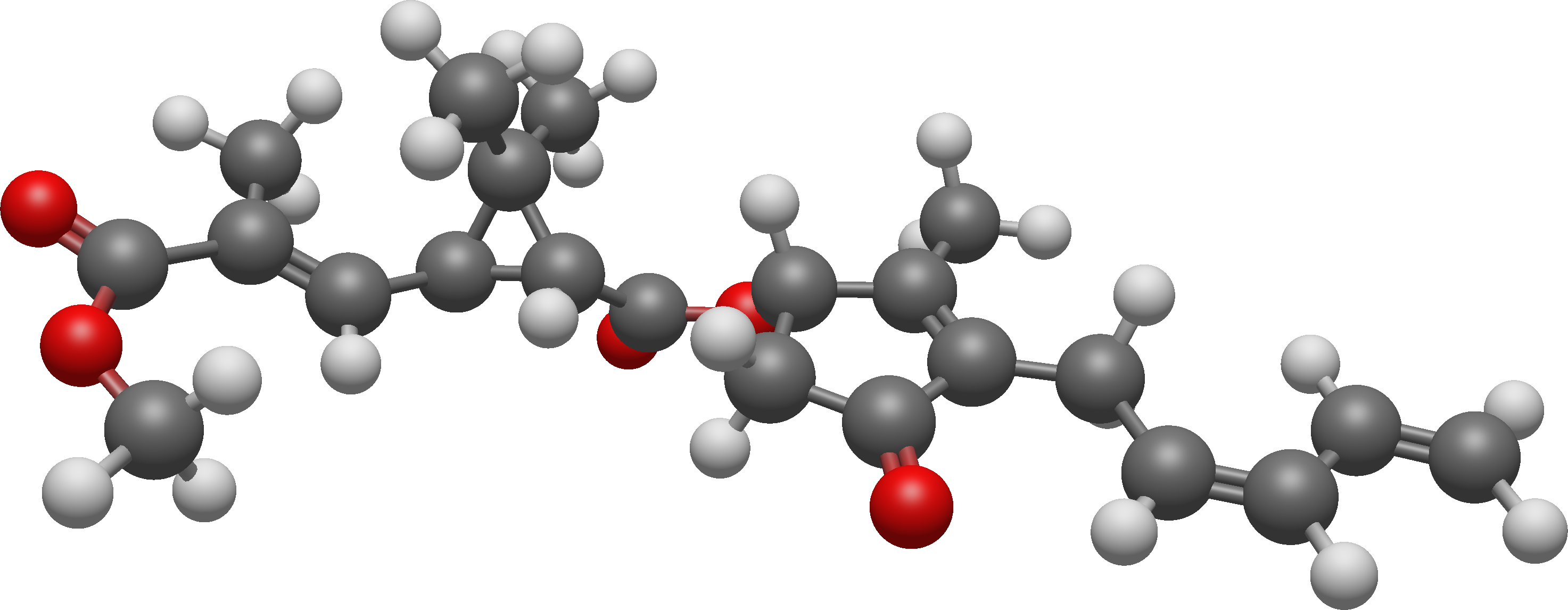

Names
- Preferred IUPAC name (1S)-2-Methyl-4-oxo-3-[(2Z)-penta-2,4-dien-1-yl]cyclopent-2-en-1-yl (1R,3R)-3-[(1E)-3-methoxy-2-methyl-3-oxoprop-1-en-1-yl]-2,2-dimethylcyclopropane-1-carboxylate

Identifiers
CAS Number	121-29-9
3D model (JSmol)	Interactive image
ChemSpider	4478783
ECHA InfoCard	100.004.057
EC Number	204-462-6
PubChem CID	5320807
UNII	5N9245585U
CompTox Dashboard (EPA)	DTXSID2042353
- InChI: InChI=1S/C22H28O5/c1-7-8-9-10-15-14(3)18(12-17(15)23)27-21(25)19-16(22(19,4)5)11-13(2)20(24)26-6/h7-9,11,16,18-19H,1,10,12H2,2-6H3/b9-8+,13-11-/t16-,18?,19?/m0/s1 Key: VJFUPGQZSXIULQ-CDPVRPLUSA-N
- SMILES: CC1=C(C(=O)CC1OC(=O)C2[C@@H](C2(C)C)/C=C(/C)\C(=O)OC)C/C=C/C=C

Properties
Chemical formula	C_{22}H_{28}O_{5}
Molar mass	372.45472

Hazards
- GHS labelling
Pictograms	(GHS07: Exclamation mark) (GHS09: Environmental hazard)
Signal word	Warning
Hazard statements	H302, H312, H332, H410
- Except where otherwise noted, data are given for materials in their standard state (at 25 °C [77 °F], 100 kPa). verify (what is ?) Infobox references

Pyrethrin II is an organic compound that is a potent insecticide. It is one of the two pyrethrins, the other being pyrethrin I. Thousands of tons this mixture are produced annually from chrysanthemum plants, which are cultivated in warm climates.

== Structure and related compounds ==
Whereas pyrethrin I is a derivative of (+)-trans-chrysanthemic acid, in pyrethrin II one methyl group is oxidized to a carboxymethyl group, the resulting core being called pyrethric acid. Knowledge of their chemical structures opened the way for the production of synthetic analogues, which are called pyrethroids. In terms of their biosynthesis, pyrethrins are classified as terpenoids, being derived from dimethylallyl pyrophosphate.
