= Manifesto of the Ninety-Three =

By German intellectuals in support of World War I

The "Manifesto of the Ninety-Three" (German: Manifest der 93; originally "To the Civilized World," An die Kulturwelt!, by "Professors of Germany") is a 4 October 1914 proclamation by 93 prominent Germans supporting Germany in the start of World War I. The Manifesto galvanized support for the war throughout German schools and universities, but many foreign intellectuals were outraged.

The astronomer Wilhelm Julius Foerster soon repented having signed the document. With the physiologist Georg Friedrich Nicolai, he drew up the "Manifesto to the Europeans". They argued:

It seems not just a good thing, but a dire necessity, that educated men of all nations direct their influence in such a way that the terms of the peace did not become the wellspring of future wars—uncertain though the outcome of the war may now still seem. The fact that this war has plunged all European relations into an equally unstable and plastic state should rather be put to use to create out of Europe an organic whole.

Whilst various people expressed sympathy with those sentiments, only the philosopher Otto Buek and Albert Einstein signed Foerster and Nicolai's counter manifesto and it remained unpublished at the time. It was subsequently brought to light by Einstein.

In 1921, a report in The New York Times found that of 76 surviving signatories, 60 expressed varying degrees of regret, and some claimed not to have seen what they had signed.

== Purpose and reaction ==
The manifesto was primarily designed to contradict the negative image of Germany being portrayed in the press by other countries (especially in Britain), which is indicated by the fact that it was published in ten different languages. In addition, the manifesto articulated moral indignation, laying charges against foreign governments, academic institutions, and scholars whom the authors believed had wronged the German nation. They also probably hoped to undermine support for the war among the civilian population of the Entente powers by demonstrating that German scientists — who at the time were very highly reputed — were fully in support of their country, thereby inducing the intellectuals of other European nations to put pressure on the governments of their respective countries. The reaction of both the European and American press, and of academic institutions around the world, indicate that the attempt was a failure.

== Text ==
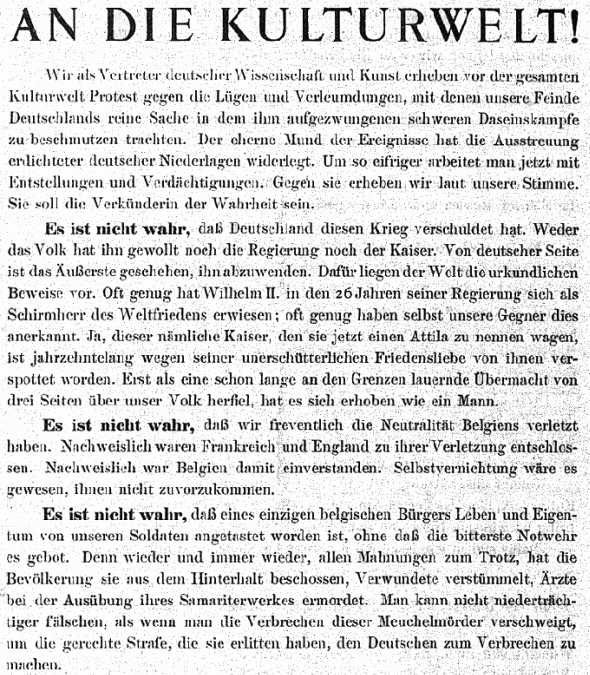
German text

Here is the English translation (italics in original) as reprinted after the war:

As representatives of German Science and Art, we hereby protest to the civilized world against the lies and calumnies with which our enemies are endeavoring to stain the honour of Germany in her hard struggle for existence—in a struggle that has been forced on her.

The iron mouth of events has proved the untruth of the fictitious German defeats; consequently misrepresentation and calumny are all the more eagerly at work. As heralds of truth we raise our voices against these.

It is not true that Germany is guilty of having caused this war. Neither the people, the Government, nor the Kaiser wanted war. Germany did her utmost to prevent it; for this assertion the world has documental proof. Often enough during the twenty-six years of his reign has Wilhelm II shown himself to be the upholder of peace, and often enough has this fact been acknowledged by our opponents. Nay, even the Kaiser, whom they now dare to call an Attila, has been ridiculed by them for years, because of his steadfast endeavors to maintain universal peace. Not till a numerical superiority which has been lying in wait on the frontiers assailed us did the whole nation rise to a man.

It is not true that we trespassed in neutral Belgium. It has been proved that France and England had resolved on such a trespass, and it has likewise been proved that Belgium had agreed to their doing so. It would have been suicide on our part not to have preempted this.

It is not true that the life and property of a single Belgian citizen was injured by our soldiers without the bitterest self-defense having made it necessary; for again and again, notwithstanding repeated threats, the citizens lay in ambush, shooting at the troops out of the houses, mutilating the wounded, and murdering in cold blood the medical men while they were doing their Samaritan work. There can be no baser abuse than the suppression of these crimes with the view of letting the Germans appear to be criminals, only for having justly punished these assassins for their wicked deeds.

It is not true that our troops treated Louvain brutally. Furious inhabitants having treacherously fallen upon them in their quarters, our troops with aching hearts were obliged to fire a part of the town as a punishment. The greatest part of Louvain has been preserved. The famous Town Hall stands quite intact; for at great self-sacrifice our soldiers saved it from destruction by the flames. Every German would of course greatly regret if in the course of this terrible war any works of art should already have been destroyed or be destroyed at some future time, but inasmuch as in our great love for art we cannot be surpassed by any other nation, in the same degree we must decidedly refuse to buy a German defeat at the cost of saving a work of art.

It is not true that our warfare pays no respect to international laws. It knows no indisciplined cruelty. But in the east the earth is saturated with the blood of women and children unmercifully butchered by the wild Russian troops, and in the west dumdum bullets mutilate the breasts of our soldiers. Those who have allied themselves with Russians and Serbians, and present such a shameful scene to the world as that of inciting Mongolians and negroes against the white race, have no right whatever to call themselves upholders of civilization.

It is not true that the combat against our so-called militarism is not a combat against our civilization, as our enemies hypocritically pretend it is. Were it not for German militarism, German civilization would long since have been extirpated. For its protection it arose in a land which for centuries had been plagued by bands of robbers as no other land had been. The German Army and the German people are one and today this consciousness fraternizes 70,000,000 Germans, all ranks, positions, and parties being one.

We cannot wrest the poisonous weapon—the lie—out of the hands of our enemies. All we can do is to proclaim to all the world that our enemies are giving false witness against us. You, who know us, who with us have protected the most holy possessions of man, we call to you:

Have faith in us! Believe, that we shall carry on this war to the end as a civilized nation, to whom the legacy of a Goethe, a Beethoven, and a Kant is just as sacred as its own hearths and homes.

For this we pledge you our names and our honor:

== Signatories ==
The 93 signatories included Nobel laureates, architects, artists, chemists, composers, philosophers, physicians, physicists, poets, theologians and known college teachers. The German composer Richard Strauss refused to sign, on the basis that "Declarations about war and politics are not fitting for an artist."

=== List of signatories ===
1. Adolf von Baeyer, chemist: synthesized indigo, 1905 recipient of the Nobel Prize in Chemistry
2. Peter Behrens, architect and designer
3. Emil Adolf von Behring, physiologist: received the 1901 Nobel Prize in Physiology or Medicine
4. Wilhelm von Bode, art historian and curator
5. Alois Brandl (Literaturwissenschaftler), Austrian-German philologist
6. Lujo Brentano, economist and social reformer
7. Justus Brinckmann, art historian
8. Johannes Conrad, political economist
9. Franz von Defregger, Austrian artist
10. Richard Dehmel, anti-conservative poet and writer
11. Adolf Deissmann, Protestant theologian
12. Wilhelm Dörpfeld, architect and archeologist (including site of ancient Troy)
13. Friedrich von Duhn, classical archaeologist
14. Paul Ehrlich, awarded the 1908 Nobel Prize in Physiology or Medicine, initiated chemotherapy, "the magic bullet"
15. Albert Ehrhard, Catholic priest and church historian
16. Karl Engler, chemist
17. Gerhard Esser, Catholic theologian
18. Rudolf Christoph Eucken, philosopher: winner of the 1908 Nobel Prize for Literature
19. Herbert Eulenberg, poet and playwright
20. Henrich Finke, Catholic church historian
21. Hermann Emil Fischer, chemist: 1902 recipient of the Nobel Prize in Chemistry
22. Wilhelm Foerster, also signed counter-manifesto
23. Ludwig Fulda, Jewish playwright with strong social commitment
24. Eduard von Gebhardt, painter
25. Jan Jakob Maria de Groot, Sinologist and historian of religion
26. Fritz Haber, chemist: received the 1918 Nobel Prize in Chemistry for synthesizing ammonia
27. Ernst Haeckel, biologist: coined the words "ecology, phylum, stem cell," developed "ontogeny recapitulates phylogeny"
28. Max Halbe, dramatist
29. Adolf von Harnack, Lutheran theologian
30. Carl Hauptmann, playwright
31. Gerhart Hauptmann, dramatist and novelist: received the 1912 Nobel Prize in Literature
32. Gustav Hellmann, meteorologist
33. Wilhelm Herrmann, Reformed theologian
34. Andreas Heusler, Swiss medievalist
35. Adolf von Hildebrand, sculptor
36. Ludwig Hoffmann, architect
37. Engelbert Humperdinck, composer: including "Hänsel und Gretel"
38. Leopold Graf von Kalckreuth, painter
39. Arthur Kampf, history painter
40. Friedrich August von Kaulbach, painter
41. Theodor Kipp, jurist
42. Felix Klein, mathematician: group theory, complex analysis, non-Euclidean geometry; "the Klein bottle"
43. Max Klinger, Symbolist painter, sculptor, printmaker, and writer
44. Aloïs Knoepfler, art historian
45. Anton Koch, Catholic theologian
46. Paul Laband, professor of law
47. Karl Lamprecht, historian
48. Philipp Lenard, physicist: winner of the 1905 Nobel Prize for Physics for cathode rays research
49. Maximilian Lenz, painter
50. Max Liebermann, Jewish Impressionist painter and printmaker
51. Franz von Liszt, jurist and legal scholar (cousin of the composer)
52. Ludwig Manzel, sculptor
53. Joseph Mausbach, theologian
54. Georg von Mayr, statistician
55. Sebastian Merkle, Catholic theologian
56. Eduard Meyer, historian
57. Heinrich Morf, linguist
58. Friedrich Naumann, liberal politician and Protestant pastor
59. Albert Neisser, physician who discovered the cause of gonorrhea
60. Walther Hermann Nernst, chemist: third law of thermodynamics, won the 1920 Nobel Prize in chemistry
61. Wilhelm Ostwald, chemist: received the 1909 Nobel Prize in Chemistry
62. Bruno Paul, architect, illustrator, interior designer, and furniture designer
63. Max Planck, theoretical physicist: originated quantum theory, awarded the Nobel Prize in Physics in 1918
64. Albert Plohn, professor of medicine
65. Georg Reicke, author and politician
66. Max Reinhardt, Austrian-born, American stage and film actor and director
67. Alois Riehl, philosopher
68. Carl Robert, philologist and archeologist
69. Wilhelm Röntgen, physicist: known for X-rays, awarded 1901 Nobel Prize in Physics
70. Max Rubner, physiologist and hygienist
71. Fritz Schaper, sculptor
72. Adolf von Schlatter, Evangelical theologian
73. August Schmidlin, theologian
74. Gustav von Schmoller, economist
75. Reinhold Seeberg, theologian
76. Martin Spahn, historian
77. Franz von Stuck, symbolist/Art Nouveau painter, sculptor, engraver, and architect
78. Hermann Sudermann, dramatist and novelist
79. Hans Thoma, painter
80. Wilhelm Trübner, realist painter
81. Karl Vollmöller, playwright and screenwriter
82. Richard Voss, dramatist and novelist
83. Karl Vossler, linguist and scholar
84. Siegfried Wagner, composer, son of Richard Wagner
85. Wilhelm Waldeyer, anatomist: named the chromosome
86. August von Wassermann, bacteriologist: developed the "Wassermann test" for syphilis
87. Felix Weingartner, Austrian conductor, composer and pianist
88. Theodor Wiegand, archeologist
89. Wilhelm Wien, physicist: received the 1911 Nobel Prize for work on heat radiation
90. Ulrich von Wilamowitz-Moellendorff, classical philologist
91. Richard Willstätter, organic chemist: won the 1915 Nobel Prize for Chemistry for structure of plant pigments
92. Wilhelm Windelband, philosopher
93. Wilhelm Wundt, physician, psychologist, physiologist, philosopher, "father of experimental psychology"

== See also ==
- Rape of Belgium
- Septemberprogramm

== General references ==
- Herbert Gantschacher "Warpropaganda and the manifesto of the Ninety-Three" in Herbert Gantschacher "VIKTOR ULLMANN ZEUGE UND OPFER DER APOKALYPSE – WITNESS AND VICTIM OF THE APOCALYPSE – Testimone e vittima dell'Apocalisse – Prič in žrtev apokalipse – Svědek a oběť apokalypsy" – Complete original authorized edition in German and English language with summaries in Italian, Slovenian and Czech language, ARBOS-Edition ISBN 978-3-9503173-3-6, Arnoldstein-Klagenfurt-Salzburg-Vienna-Prora-Prague 2015, page 185.
- Meyer-Rewerts, U.; Stöckmann, H. (2010). "Das ′Manifest der 93′: Ausdruck oder Negation der Zivilgesellschaft?". In Johanna Klatt; Robert Lorenz (eds.). Manifeste: Geschichte und Gegenwart des politischen Appells (in German). Bielefeld: Transcript Verlag. ISBN 978-3-83941-679-2.
