= Werner Kern =

Werner Kern may refer to:

- Werner Kern (football manager) (born 1946), German football coach and former manager
- Werner Kern (chemist) (1906–1985), German chemist
