= Amit Das =

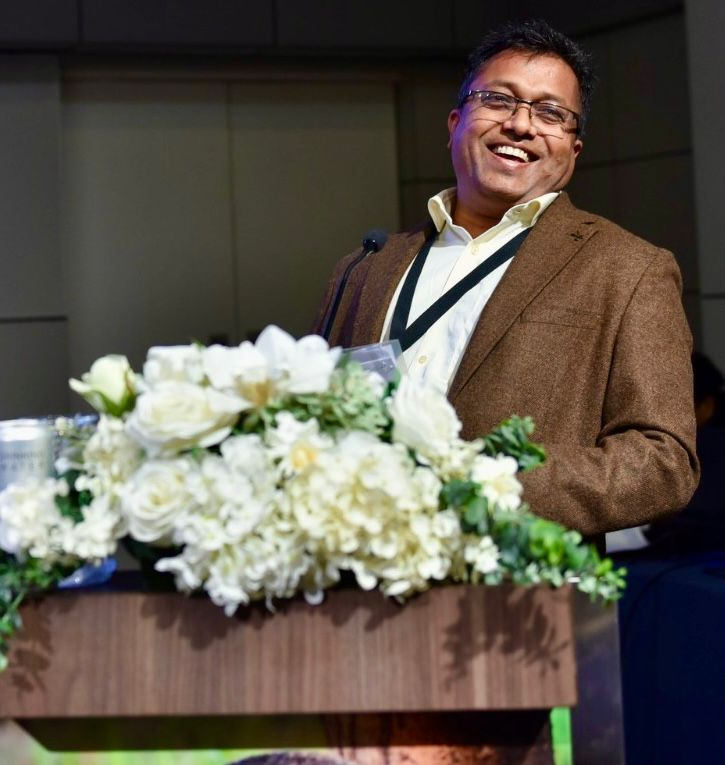
- Amit Das in 2025
- Born: 1971 (age 54–55); Burdwan, West Bengal, India
- Education: University of Calcutta; Visva-Bharati University; Indian Association for the Cultivation of Science
- Known for: Smart and functional elastomers, rubber nanocomposites
- Awards: Sparks–Thomas Award (2016); Innovation Prize (IPF); FiDiPro Fellow
- Scientific career
- Fields: Polymer science, rubber technology
- Workplaces: Leibniz Institute of Polymer Research Dresden
- Thesis: Studies on the vulcanization of polychloroprene rubber by thiophosphoryl compounds (2004)
- Doctoral advisor: Dipak Kumar Basu
- Website: Official profile

Amit Das (born 1971) is an Indian-born polymer scientist specializing in rubber chemistry, elastomer technology, and nanocomposite materials. He is a senior scientist at the Leibniz Institute of Polymer Research Dresden (IPF), Germany, and an adjunct professor at Tampere University in Finland.

== Education ==
Das completed his PhD in 2004 at the Indian Association for the Cultivation of Science, Kolkata, under the supervision of Dipak Kumar Basu. His doctoral thesis was titled Studies on the vulcanization of polychloroprene rubber by thiophosphoryl compounds. He obtained his MSc in Physical Chemistry from Visva-Bharati University in 1997 and his BSc in Chemistry, with minors in Physics and Mathematics, from the University of Calcutta in 1991.

== Career ==
Since 2005, Das has been affiliated with the Leibniz Institute of Polymer Research Dresden (IPF), where he has worked within the elastomer research group established under the leadership of Gert Heinrich. He is the head of the research group Smart and Functional Elastomers, which focuses on advanced elastomer materials, including self-healing, conductive, and high-performance rubber systems.

He has also been associated with Tampere University in Finland, where he has served as a Finland Distinguished Professor (FiDiPro) since 2011, leading research on bio-inspired elastomer composites.

== Research and contributions ==
Das's research focuses on the integration of nanotechnology into elastomer systems, particularly through the incorporation of nanoparticles into rubber materials to create advanced nanocomposites. His work has contributed to the development of high-performance and environmentally sustainable rubber materials, including applications in the tire industry for improved fuel efficiency, safety, and reduced environmental impact.

His research group employs an interdisciplinary approach, combining materials science, physics, and chemistry, covering areas from theoretical modeling and fracture mechanics to industrial-scale material development.

Das has authored more than 300 scientific publications and holds over 20 patents. His work has received more than 11,000 citations, with an h-index above 50.

== Awards and honours ==
Das has received several awards and recognitions, including:

- Sparks–Thomas Award (2016), awarded by the ACS Rubber Division for outstanding contributions to rubber science and technology.
- Innovation Prize, Leibniz Institute of Polymer Research Dresden
- Fellow of the Finland Distinguished Professor Programme (FiDiPro)

== Professional activities ==
Das serves as an associate editor of the journal Rubber Chemistry and Technology and is an active contributor to international conferences in polymer and elastomer research.

== Selected topics of research ==
- Smart and self-healing elastomers
- Bio-inspired elastomer composites
- Rubber nanocomposites
- Sustainable and environmentally friendly rubber materials
