= Hermann Staudinger Prize =

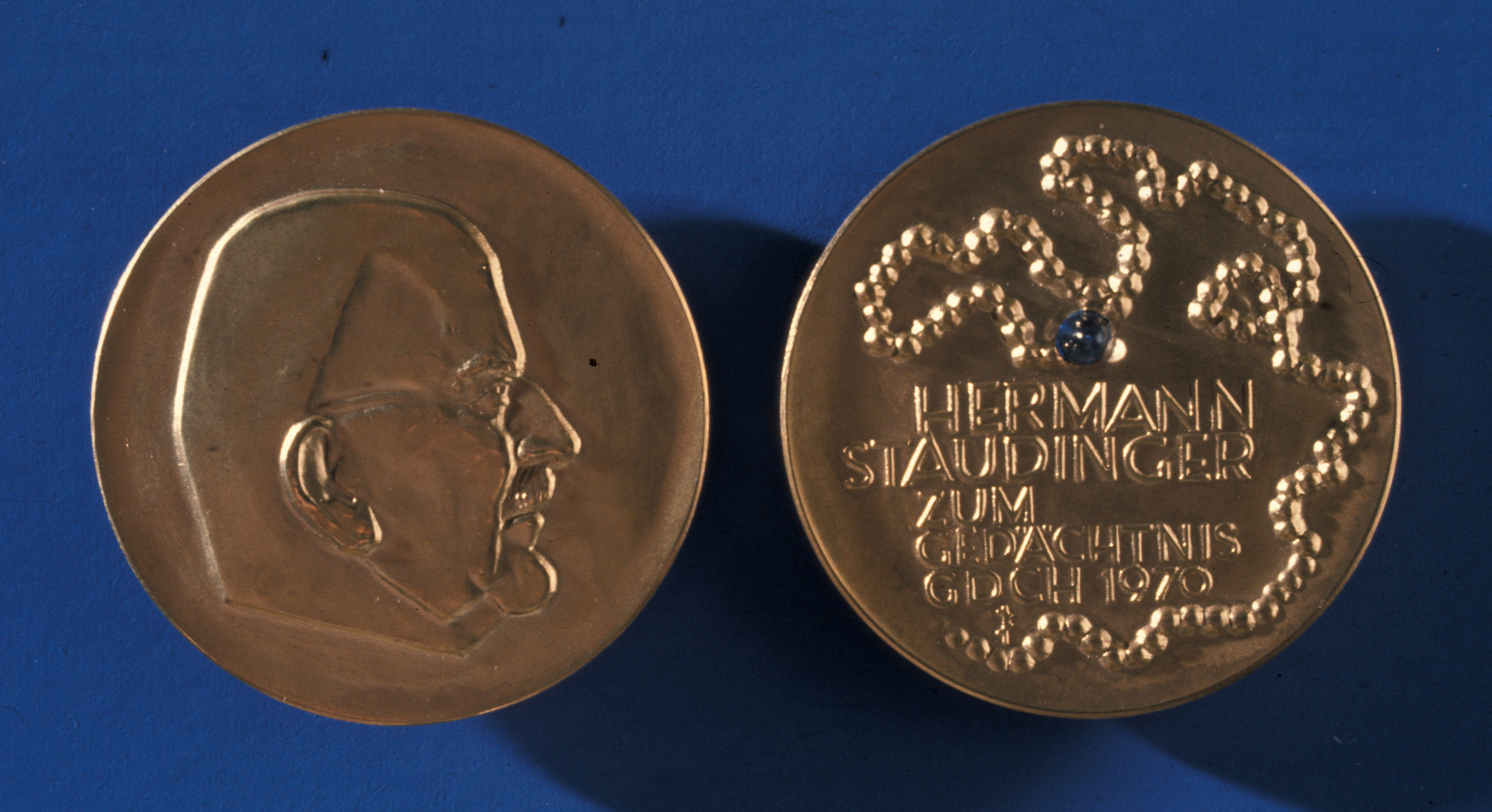
Hermann Staudinger metal

The Hermann Staudinger Prize is awarded by the German Chemical Society for groundbreaking work in the field of macromolecular chemistry and polymer science. It comes with a gold medal and a sum of money (currently 7500 euros). It is awarded in even-numbered years and is named after the Nobel Prize in chemistry winner Hermann Staudinger, who is the founder of the field. The prize started in 1970 through donation from BASF and the first prize was handed out in 1971.

== Past recipients ==
- 1971 Werner Kern and Günter Victor Schulz
- 1973 Otto Bayer
- 1976 Hans Fikentscher
- 1977 Hermann Schnell
- 1979 Georg Manecke
- 1981 Hans Batzer
- 1985 Helmut Ringsdorf
- 1990 Gerhard Wegner
- 1994 Burkart Philipp
- 1997 Hansjörg Sinn
- 2000 Walter Hugo Stockmayer
- 2003 Walter Kaminsky
- 2006 Wolfgang Peter Meier
- 2009 Rolf Mülhaupt
- 2012 Axel Müller
- 2014 Martin Möller
- 2016 Klaus Müllen
- 2018 Brigitte Voit
- 2020 Markus Antonietti
- 2022 Bert Meijer
- 2024 Kurt Kremer
