= Walter Kaminsky =

German chemist (1941–2024)

Walter Kaminsky (7 May 1941 – 23 November 2024) was a German chemist who specialised in olefin polymerization and plastic recycling. He discovered the high activity of Group 4 metallocene/methylaluminoxane (MAO) mixtures (later named the Kaminsky catalyst) as catalysts for olefin polymerization in 1980.

== Life and career ==
Kaminsky was born in Hamburg, Germany on 7 May 1941. He studied chemistry at the University of Hamburg. He received his PhD under Hansjörg Sinn in 1978 and obtained his habilitation in 1982, both at the University of Hamburg. He was a faculty member at the University of Hamburg since 1977, and later became a full professor for Technical and Macromolecular Chemistry. He retired and became an emeritus professor in 2006.

He was awarded, among other prizes, the Körber European Science Prize in 1988, the 1999 Benjamin Franklin Medal, and the Hermann Staudinger Prize 2002. In 2024, he was inducted into the Plastics Hall of Fame.

Kaminsky died on 23 November 2024, at the age of 83.

== Bibliography ==
- Kaminsky, Walter; Sinn, Hansjörg, eds. (1988). Transition Metals and Organometallics as Catalysts for Olefin Polymerization. Berlin, Heidelberg: Springer Berlin Heidelberg. doi:10.1007/978-3-642-83276-5. ISBN 978-3-642-83278-9.
- Kaminsky, Walter, ed. (1999). Metalorganic Catalysts for Synthesis and Polymerization. Berlin, Heidelberg: Springer Berlin Heidelberg. doi:10.1007/978-3-642-60178-1. ISBN 978-3-642-64292-0.
- Scheirs, John; Kaminsky, Walter, eds. (2000). Metallocene based polyolefins: preparation, properties, and technology. Vol. 1. Chichester Weinheim: Wiley. ISBN 978-0-471-99911-9.
- Scheirs, John; Kaminsky, W., eds. (2000). Metallocene-based polyolefins: preparation, properties, and technology. Vol. 2. Chichester; New York: Wiley. ISBN 978-0-471-98086-5.
- Kaminsky, W., ed. (2006). Olefin polymerization: selected contributions from the conference in Hamburg (Germany), October 10-12, 2005. Macromolecular symposia. Weinheim, Germany: Wiley-VCH Verlag. ISBN 978-3-527-31742-4. OCLC 68568114.
- Scheirs, John; Kaminsky, Walter (2006). Feedstock recycling and pyrolysis of waste plastics: converting waste plastics into diesel and other fuels. Wiley series in polymer science. Chichester: J. Wiley & sons. ISBN 978-0-470-02152-1.
- Kaminsky, Walter, ed. (2013). Polyolefins: 50 years after Ziegler and Natta I: Polyethylene and Polypropylene. Advances in Polymer Science. Vol. 257. Berlin, Heidelberg: Springer Berlin Heidelberg. doi:10.1007/978-3-642-40808-3. ISBN 978-3-642-40807-6.
- Kaminsky, Walter, ed. (2013). Polyolefins: 50 years after Ziegler and Natta II: Polyolefins by Metallocenes and Other Single-Site Catalysts. Advances in Polymer Science. Vol. 258. Berlin, Heidelberg: Springer Berlin Heidelberg. doi:10.1007/978-3-642-40805-2. ISBN 978-3-642-40804-5.
