= Bernd Büchner =

German physicist

Bernd Büchner (born 26 May 1961) is, since 2003, Director of the Institute for Solid State Research, IFW Dresden and Professor for Experimental Physics at the Dresden University of Technology. Büchner is known for contributions to the field of high-temperature superconductivity, recent work on iron-based superconductors and authored over 1000 scientific papers.

Born in Bergisch Gladbach, Germany, Bernd Büchner graduated at the University of Cologne, where he obtained a PhD in 1993 and was habilitated in 1999. From 2000 to 2003, Büchner was Professor for Experimental Physics at the RWTH Aachen University. In 2003, he started serving as director of the IFW (sub-)Institute of Solid State Research (IFF). Subsequently from 2018, Büchner took over the post of scientific direction of the whole Leibniz IFW complex (whose other subinstitutes still have their own respective directors).
