= Oskars Voits =

Latvian diplomat

Latvian Ambassador to Germany, Hungary, the Netherlands and Switzerland
- In office 1921 – 1932

Personal details
- Born: April 18, 1866 Ropaži Parish, Livonia, Russian Empire
- Died: September 19, 1959 (aged 93) Freiburg im Breisgau, West Germany
- Education: University of Dorpat
- Occupation: Physician

Oskars Augusts Voits (1866–1959) was a Latvian medical doctor and diplomat. In addition to a long medical career, Voits played a role in establishing Latvia's diplomatic relations abroad after the Latvian War of Independence.

== Biography ==
Voits was born in 1866 in Ropaži Parish, Latvia, then part of the Livonia Governorate of the Russian Empire. After obtaining a primary education he enrolled in the University of Tartu, graduating in 1892. Voits worked as a doctor for much of his professional life, working first as a medical assistant in Tartu before working at a hospital in Saint Petersburg. During his residency in Saint Petersburg, Voits travelled extensively to Germany and Switzerland. After the Bolshevik government ended Russia's participation in World War I signing the Treaty of Brest-Litovsk with the German Empire, under the terms of which Russia relinquished its rights to a part of its western territory that included Voits' native Latvia, Voits worked to help Latvian refugees in Russia emigrate back to Latvia. Voits himself would return to Latvia in 1919, after which he continued his medical work and became the director of a hospital in Riga. In 1920 he assisted in the found of a medical college at the University of Latvia.

Following the conclusion of the Latvian War of Independence in 1920, the new Latvian government began to establish diplomatic ties with other European nations. Voits became one of several Latvians appointed as diplomats, serving first as diplomat to Germany and then later as Latvian ambassador to Germany from 1921 onward. He also served as Latvian ambassador to Switzerland, the Netherlands, and Hungary until being recalled at his own request in 1932. After his diplomatic service, he returned to Latvia.

He was the father of Latvian biologist Magda Staudinger. Voits fled from Latvia in 1944 and lived with his daughter in Freiburg im Breisgau, where he died in 1959.
