= Chrysanthemic acid =

- (1R,3R)- or (+)-trans-chrysanthemic acid

Names
- IUPAC name 2,2-Dimethyl-3-(2-methylprop-1-enyl)cyclopropane-1-carboxylic acid

Identifiers
| CAS Number | 4638-92-0 (1R,3R) or (+)-trans; 2259-14-5 (1S,3S) or (−)-trans; 26771-11-9 (1R,3S) or (+)-cis; 26771-06-2 (1S,3R) or (−)-cis |
| 3D model (JSmol) | Interactive image |
| ChEMBL | ChEMBL1437285 |
| ChemSpider | 15876 (+)-trans; 19543 (−)-cis |
| ECHA InfoCard | 100.022.788 |
| PubChem CID | 16747 (1R,3R) or (+)-trans; 33607 (1S,3S) or (−)-trans; 33606 (1R,3S) or (+)-cis; 20755 (1S,3R) or (−)-cis |
| UNII | 23FP207VLY (1R,3R) or (+)-trans; 75957WZ15Y (1S,3S) or (−)-trans; 5P7V8620AM (1R,3S) or (+)-cis; TFK3B71TRY (1S,3R) or (−)-cis |
| CompTox Dashboard (EPA) | DTXSID101033188 DTXSID60883558, DTXSID101033188 |
- InChI: InChI=1S/C10H16O2/c1-6(2)5-7-8(9(11)12)10(7,3)4/h5,7-8H,1-4H3,(H,11,12)/t7-,8+/m0/s1 Key: XLOPRKKSAJMMEW-JGVFFNPUSA-N
- SMILES: CC(=CC1C(C1(C)C)C(=O)O)C

Properties
| Chemical formula | C_{10}H_{16}O_{2} |
| Molar mass | 168.236 g·mol^{−1} |
| Melting point | 17 °C (63 °F; 290 K) (1R,3R) or (+)-trans |
- Except where otherwise noted, data are given for materials in their standard state (at 25 °C [77 °F], 100 kPa). Infobox references

Chrysanthemic acid is an organic compound that is related to a variety of natural and synthetic insecticides. It is a terpenoic acid related to the pyrethrin I and II, as well as the pyrethroids and can be used as a base for pyrethroid synthesis. One of the four stereoisomers, (1R,3R)- or (+)-trans-chrysanthemic acid (pictured), is the acid part of the ester pyrethrin I, which occurs naturally in the seed cases of Chrysanthemum cinerariaefolium. Many synthetic pyrethroids, for example the allethrins, are esters of all four stereoisomers. Staudinger and Ružička named chrysanthemic acid in 1924.

== Biosynthesis ==
Chrysanthemic acid is derived from two dimethylallyl diphosphate (DMAPP) isoprene units in several steps. First, the enzyme chrysanthemyl diphosphate synthase (CDS) catalyses the head-to-head coupling of the isoprene units to produce trans-chrysanthemyl diphosphate (CDP). In the second step, CDP is converted into trans-chrysanthemol, catalysed by either CDS or one or more phosphatases. Two subsequent oxidation reactions, catalysed sequentially by an alcohol dehydrogenase (ADH) and an aldehyde dehydrogenase (ALDH), convert trans-chrysanthemol to trans-chrysanthemic acid.

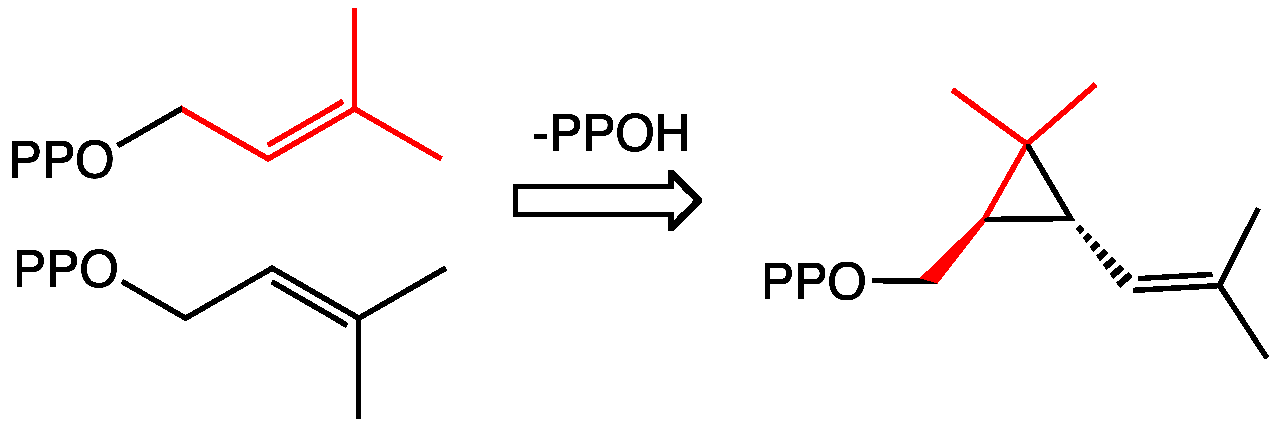

== Industrial synthesis ==
Chrysanthemic acid is produced industrially in a cyclopropanation reaction of a diene as a mixture of cis- and trans isomers, followed by hydrolysis of the ester:

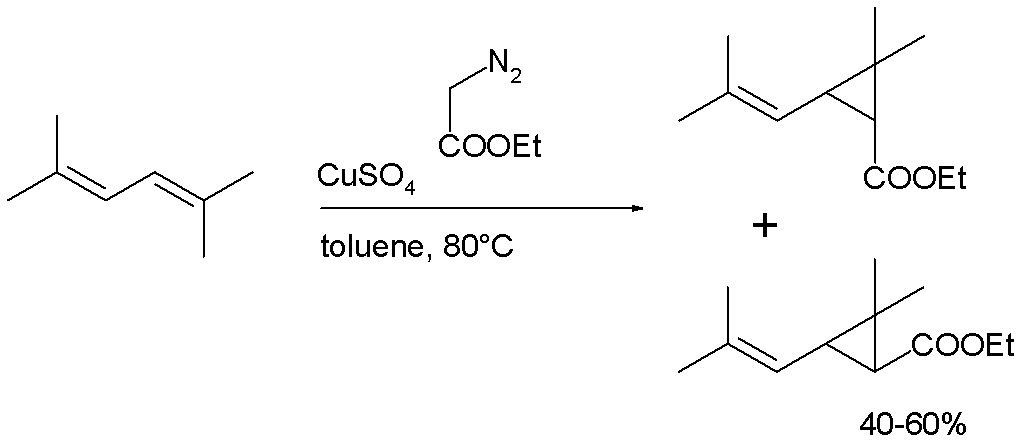

Many pyrethroids are accessible by re-esterification of chrysanthemic acid ethyl ester - a perfume ingredient.
