= Dora Staudinger =

German-Swiss religious socialist and publicist

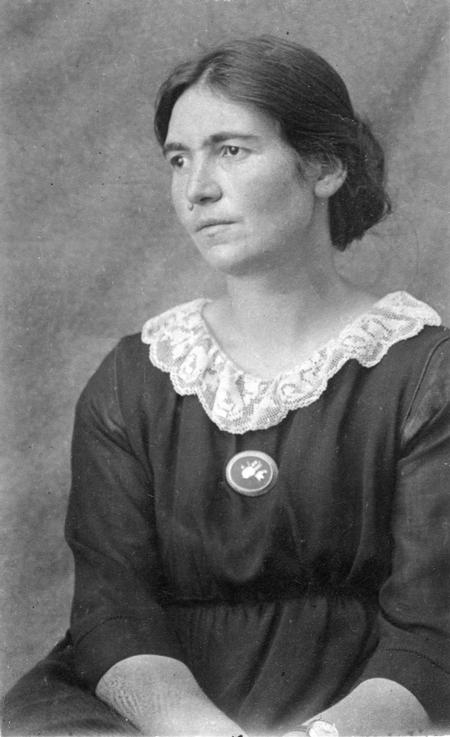
- Born: 14 February 1886; Halle (Saale)
- Died: 3 June 1964 (aged 78); Wetzikon
- Children: 4

Dora Förster became Dora Staudinger; then Dora Mohler (14 February 1886 – 3 June 1964) was a German-Swiss religious socialist and publicist.

== Life ==
Staudinger was born in Halle (Saale). She was the last child of six born to Mina (born Travers) and Franz Theodor Förster, pastor and professor of theology. She was brought in a religious household and she attended Halle's girls' elementary school until she was 14. Her mother prepared her for her expected role as wife and mother.

In 1906 Dora Förster married the chemist (and later Nobel Prize winner) Hermann Staudinger, son of women's rights activist Auguste (born Wenk) and Franz Staudinger, a high school teacher. She and Hermann first lived in Strasbourg, then in Karlsruhe, and from 1912 in Zurich. Dora Staudinger supported her husband, then a young aspiring scientist, by dictating his lectures and doing administrative work. Between 1907 and 1916 she gave birth to four children. Her daughters Eva Lezzi (1907-1993) and Klar (Klara) Kaufmann (1916-2007) were later to get involved in the fight against National-socialism. The divorce from her husband in 1926 meant economic and social decline for Staudinger. In 1929 she married the painter Adolf Mohler (this second marriage ended in divorce in 1937).

After her first marriage, Staudinger became active in the cooperative and women's movements. In her eyes, a cooperative organization supported by women held the potential to realize the socialist utopia democratically and non-violently. In 1913, encouraged by women from the English labour movement, she founded the first women's commission in a Swiss cooperative in the Zürich food association (consumer associations). In 1914 she joined the Social Democratic Party (SP).

Starting in 1915 she and Clara Ragaz built the Swiss branch of the Women's International League for Peace and Freedom (WILPF). She gave lectures on women's and cooperative issues in German-speaking Switzerland and offered introductory courses in cooperatives in Zurich. At the national level, she tried together with others to unite the religious socialists and helped Leonhard Ragaz to his supremacy within this group around 1917.

She was a board member of the housing co-operative Allgemeine Baugenossenschaft Zürich (ABZ) from 1919 to 1920 as an expert on housing welfare on two municipal committees between 1919 and 1929, she worked hard to ensure that the needs of single and married women working in the homes were part of the design. From 1925 to 1929, as first secretary of the Association for the Protection of Mothers and Infants, she accompanied unmarried mothers in need. In 1927 Leonhard Ragaz broke off contact with her.

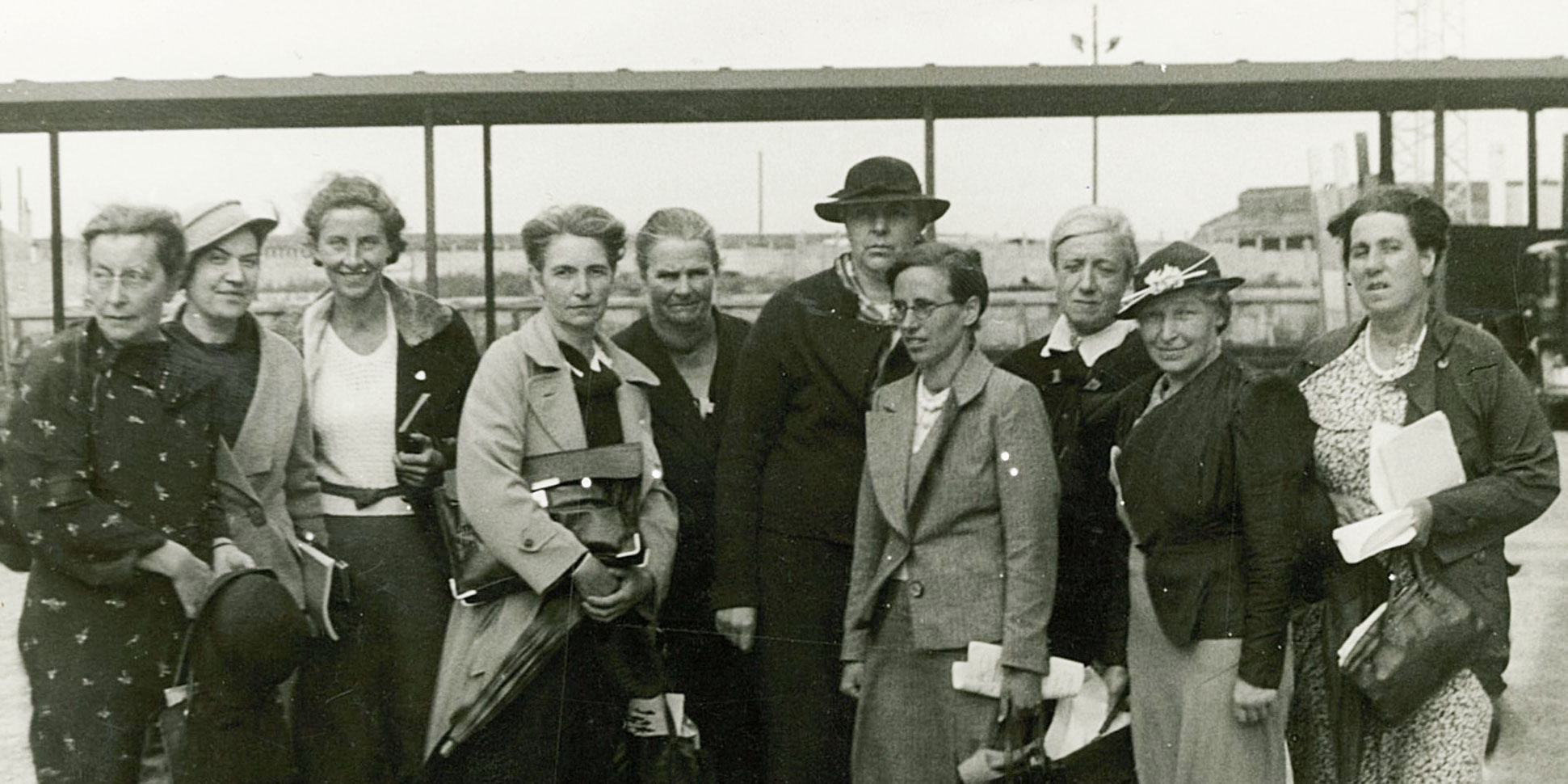
Dora Staudinger fourth from left in 1938 en route to an international congress of women against war and fascism.

From 1929 to 1934 Staudinger lived with her second husband in Hirzel. She used the name Mohler from 1929 to 1937. She was poor with her living coming from handicrafts and self-sufficiency. Despite her poverty she housed refugees from 1933. She was helping communist aid organizations and in 1935 she founded the Swiss branch of the Women's Committee against War and Fascism. As its secretary, she was a delegate to international peace conferences. In 1936 she joined the Communist Party. In 1939 she worked for the communist Rundschau news agency. During the war, she supported herself either with unskilled work or the occasional newspaper article. Between 1944 and 1955 she was a member of the Labor Party and she was a secretary for the Coordination Office for Post-War Aid. When that stopped she went to work for the Forward magazine.

In 1956, she became a Quaker and this revived her religious socialism. Staudinger lived with her youngest daughter in Zurich for a long time; in the summer months she often stayed in Feldis.

Staudinger died in Wetzikon. There is a street named after her on the Ruggächern estate in Zurich that was created by ABZ.
