= Manifesto to the Europeans =

Pacifistic proclamation

The ″Manifesto to the Europeans″ (German: Aufruf an die Europäer) was a pacifistic proclamation written in response to the Manifesto of the Ninety-Three that included as its authors, German astronomer, Wilhelm Julius Foerster, and German physiologist, Georg Friedrich Nicolai. Foerster soon regretted signing the ″Manifesto of the Ninety-Three″ and with Nicolai drew up the ″Manifesto to the Europeans″ as an intellectual atonement, one which expressed hope that Europe's sense of a common culture could bring an end to the calamitous First World War. While a number of intellectuals of the period were sympathetic to the contents of the document, aside from the authors, only renowned German-born physicist Albert Einstein and German philosopher Otto Buek signed it.

== History ==
Following the October 1914 publication of the ″Manifesto of the Ninety-Three″, which was an attempt by a sizable group of German artists and intellectuals to justify Germany's militarism and position during the First World War, (Note: Being pacifists, Hermann Hesse and Albert Einstein refused to sign this document.) one of its original signatories, Wilhelm Foerster, as well as dissenters Albert Einstein, Georg Friedrich Nicolai, and Otto Buek rebutted the Manifesto of the Ninety-Three's contents by supporting and signing the ″Manifesto to the Europeans″ instead. This document urged scholars and artists alike to support a common world culture (principally European) and to transcend "nationalistic passions". Although the document had been sent to numerous university professors, it did not find any other signatories beyond the four—Nicolai, Einstein, Buek, and Foerster—and in the end, was only published in an unauthorized form by a Swiss publisher in 1917.

Being an author of the ″Manifesto to the Europeans″ proved detrimental to physician and medical professor Georg Friedrich Nicolai's career, who at the time was serving in Berlin as a medical officer. He was transferred out of his unit to a remote garrison, demoted in rank, and tasked to otherwise menial duties. By the time World War I came to a close, Nicolai had been imprisoned by the German state but made a dramatic escape to Denmark in a fragile Albatross aircraft. He became, along with the likes of French author Romain Rolland and British mathematician Bertrand Russell, one of the leading international proponents of pacifism. While eventually Nicolai was reinstated as a professor at the University of Berlin, militant right wing agitators routinely disrupted his lectures and threatened his students, so sometime in April 1922, Nicolai moved to Argentina and never resettled in Germany.

== Text ==
A copy of the text was found amid Albert Einstein's writings. He captured its contents for posterity. It reads:

While technology and traffic clearly drive us toward a factual recognition of international relations, and thus toward a common world civilization, it is also true that no war has ever so intensively interrupted the cultural communalism of cooperative work as this present war does. Perhaps we have come to such a salient awareness only on account of the numerous erstwhile common bonds, whose interruption we now sense so painfully.

Even if this state of affairs should not surprise us, those whose heart is in the least concerned about common world civilization, would have a doubled obligation to fight for the upholding of those principles. Those, however, of whom one should expect such convictions—that is, principally scientists and artists—have thus far almost exclusively uttered statements which would suggest that their desire for the maintenance of these relations has evaporated concurrently with the interruption of the relations. They have spoken with explainable martial spirit—but spoken least of all of peace.

Such a mood cannot be excused by any national passion; it is unworthy of all that which the world has to date understood by the name of culture. Should this mood achieve a certain universality among the educated, this would be a disaster. It would not only be a disaster for civilization, but—and we are firmly convinced of this—a disaster for the national survival of individual states—the very cause for which, ultimately, all this barbarity has been unleashed.

Through technology the world has become smaller; the states of the large peninsula of Europe appear today as close to each other as the cities of each small Mediterranean peninsula appeared in ancient times. In the needs and experiences of every individual, based on his awareness of a manifold of relations, Europe-one could almost say the world-already outlines itself as an element of unity.

It would consequently be a duty of the educated and well-meaning Europeans to at least make the attempt to prevent Europe—on account of its deficient organization as a whole—from suffering the same tragic fate as ancient Greece once did. Should Europe too gradually exhaust itself and thus perish from fratricidal war?

The struggle raging today will likely produce no victor; it will leave probably only the vanquished. Therefore, it seems not only good, but rather bitterly necessary, that educated men of all nations marshal their influence such that—whatever the still uncertain end of the war may be—the terms of peace shall not become the wellspring of future wars. The evident fact that through this war all European relational conditions slipped into an unstable and plasticized state should rather be used to create an organic European whole. The technological and intellectual conditions for this are extant.

It need not be deliberated herein by which manner this (new) ordering in Europe is possible. We want merely to emphasize very fundamentally that we are firmly convinced that the time has come where Europe must act as one in order to protect her soil, her inhabitants, and her culture.

To this end, it seems first of all to be a necessity that all those who have a place in their hearts for European culture and civilization, in other words, those who can be called in Goethe's prescient words "good Europeans," come together. For we must not, after all, give up the hope that their raised and collective voices—even beneath the din of arms—will not resound unheard, especially, if among these "good Europeans of tomorrow," we find all those who enjoy esteem and authority among their educated peers.

But it is necessary that the Europeans first come together, and if—as we hope—enough Europeans in Europe can be found, that it is to say, people to whom Europe is not merely a geographical concept, but rather, a dear affair of the heart, then we shall try to call together such a union of Europeans. Thereupon, such a union shall speak and decide.

To this end we only want to urge and appeal; and if you feel as we do, if you are like-mindedly determined to provide the European will the farthest-reaching possible resonance, then we ask you to please send your (supporting) signature to us.

== Bibliography ==
- Einstein, Albert; Beck, Anna; Havas, Peter (1997). The Collected Papers of Albert Einstein, Vol. 6, The Berlin Years: Writings, 1914–1917. Translated by Alfred Engel. Princeton, NJ: Princeton University Press. ISBN 0-691-01734-4.
- Leonhard, Jörn (2018). Pandora's Box: A History of the First World War. London and Cambridge, MA: The Belknap Press of Harvard University Press. ISBN 978-0-78643-935-5.
- Meyer-Rewerts, U.; Stöckmann, H. (2010). "Das ′Manifest der 93′: Ausdruck oder Negation der Zivilgesellschaft?". In Johanna Klatt; Robert Lorenz (eds.). Manifeste: Geschichte und Gegenwart des politischen Appells (in German). Bielefeld: Transcript Verlag. ISBN 978-3-83941-679-2.
- Ortiz, Eduardo L. (1995). "A Convergence of Interests: Einstein's Visit to Argentina in 1925". Ibero-amerikanisches Archiv. 21 (1/2): 67–126. JSTOR 43392706.
- Scheideler, Britta (2002). "The Scientist as Moral Authority: Albert Einstein between Elitism and Democracy, 1914–1933". Historical Studies in the Physical and Biological Sciences. 32 (2): 319–346. doi:10.1525/hsps.2002.32.2.319. JSTOR 10.1525/hsps.2002.32.2.319.
- Shand, James D. (1975). "Doves among the Eagles: German Pacifists and Their Government during World War I". Journal of Contemporary History. 10 (1): 95–108. doi:10.1177/002200947501000105. JSTOR 260139. S2CID 154133994.
