= Chrysanthemyl diphosphate synthase =

Class of enzymes

Identifiers
- EC no.: 2.5.1.67

Databases
- IntEnz: IntEnz view
- BRENDA: BRENDA entry
- ExPASy: NiceZyme view
- KEGG: KEGG entry
- MetaCyc: metabolic pathway
- PRIAM: profile
- PDB structures: RCSB PDB PDBe PDBsum
Search
- PMC: articles
- PubMed: articles
- NCBI: proteins

In enzymology, a chrysanthemyl diphosphate synthase (EC 2.5.1.67) is an enzyme involved in the biosynthesis of terpenoids. This enzyme is also known as CPPase. It catalyzes the chemical reaction shown below (color-coded to show how precursors link):

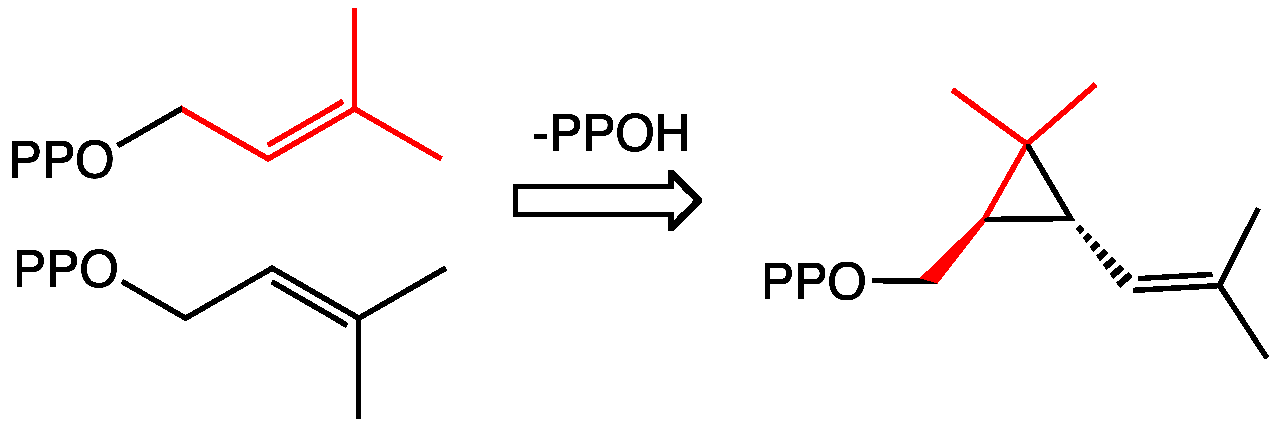

The substrate of CPPase is dimethylallyl diphosphate. The two products are diphosphate and chrysanthemyl diphosphate.

This enzyme is involved in the biosynthesis of pyrethrins, highly potent insecticides found in some flowers. The systematic name of this enzyme class is dimethylallyl-diphosphate:dimethylallyl-diphosphate dimethylallyltransferase (chrysanthemyl-diphosphate-forming).
