= Aloïs Brandl =

German philologist (1855–1940)

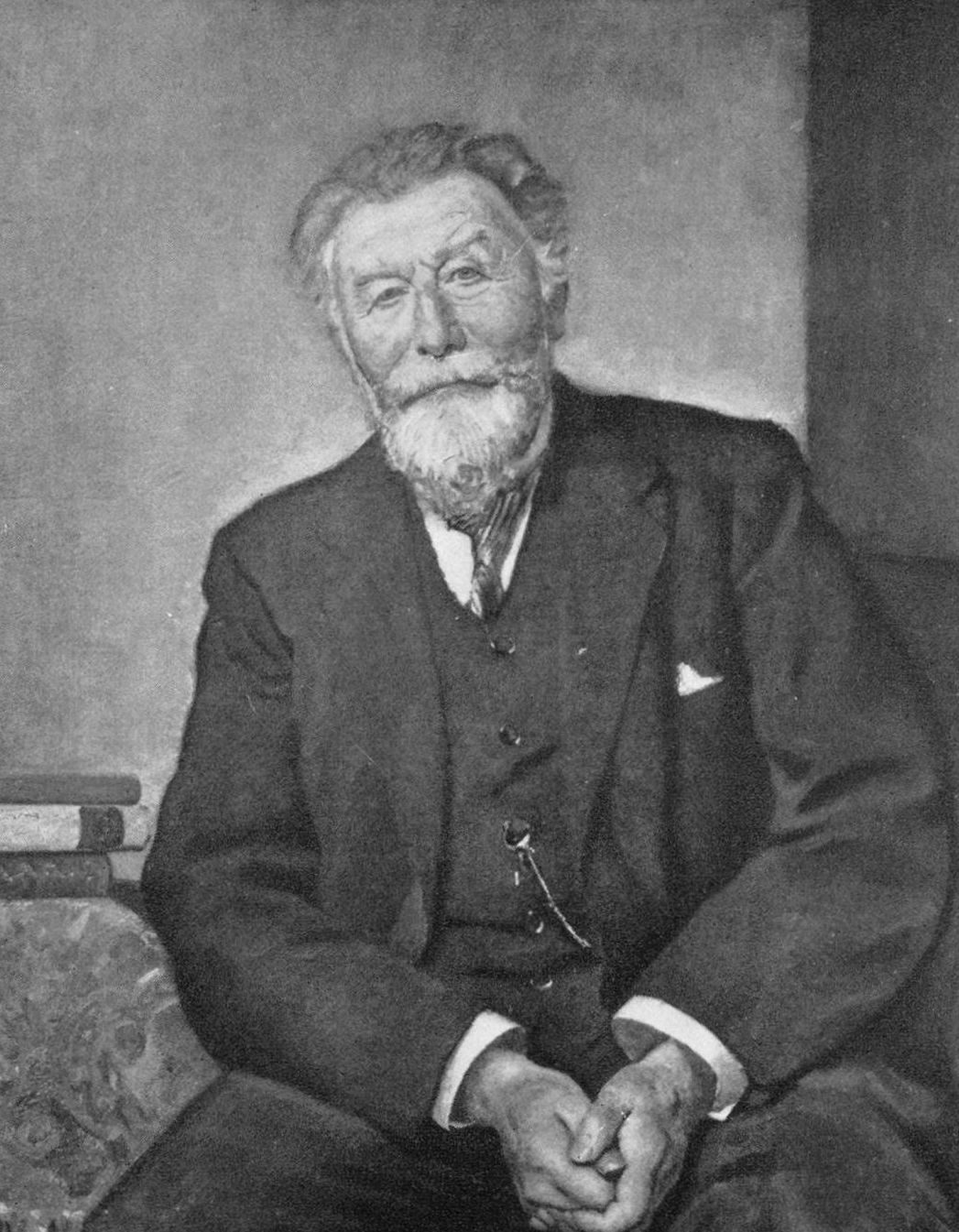
- Aloïs Brandl
- Born: June 21, 1855; Innsbruck, Austria
- Died: February 5, 1940 (aged 84); Berlin, Germany
- Occupation: Philologist
- Scientific career
- Fields: Philology

Alois Brandl (Innsbruck, June 21, 1855 – Berlin, February 5, 1940) was an Austrian born German philologist who specialized in early-modern and modern English. He was also a Shakespeare scholar and wrote a number of notable books.

== Education ==
He completed his PhD at the University of Vienna.

== Career ==
He held teaching positions at the universities of Prague, Göttingen, and Strasbourg.

In 1895, he became the professor of English Studies at the Friedrich-Wilhelms-Universität in Berlin.

== Bibliography ==
He is the author of a number of books:

- History of English Literature: From the fourteenth century
- Samuel Taylor Coleridge and the English Romantic School
- Shakespeare and Germany
- The Universal Anthology

== See also ==
- Manifesto of the Ninety-Three
- Philology
