= Magda Staudinger =

Latvian biologist and botanist (1902–1997)

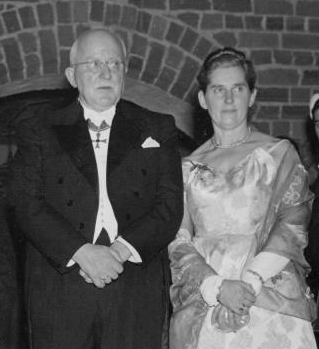
- Hermann and Magda Staudinger in Stockholm in 1953
- Born: Magda Voita; 17 August 1902; Elva, Governorate of Livonia, Russian Empire (now Elva, Estonia)
- Died: 21 April 1997 (aged 94); Freiburg im Breisgau, Germany
- Other names: Magda Woit Staudinger, Magda Štaudingere, Magda Štaudingere-Voita
- Education: University of Berlin; University of Latvia
- Occupation: biologist/botanist
- Years active: 1927–1976
- Spouse: Hermann Staudinger

Magda Staudinger (Latvian: Magda Štaudingere; 17 August 1902 – 21 April 1997) was a Latvian biologist and botanist who studied macromolecules with her husband Hermann Staudinger and their application to biology. She was acknowledged as his collaborator when he won the Nobel Prize for Chemistry, and she published seven volumes of his works after his death. She was awarded the Grand Order of the Latvian Academy of Sciences Medal for her contributions to the furtherance of science.

== Biography ==
Magda Voita (German: Magda Woit) was born on 17 August 1902 in Elva, Estonia to the Latvian physician Oskars Voits. As a child, she lived in Saint Petersburg, later traveled extensively throughout Germany, Hungary and Switzerland and gained fluency in English, French, German and Russian. She was also an accomplished pianist and violinist. She settled in Germany for her university studies at the University of Berlin. She studied plants under Gottlieb Haberlandt and obtained a degree in natural sciences in 1925. She then continued her studies at the University of Latvia in Riga under Nikolajs Malta until 1927, when she earned her PhD. That year, Voita married Hermann Staudinger, who would later win a Nobel Prize in Chemistry, and moved with him to take up a position at Freiburg University in Germany. She met Hermann after she had passed her Latvian state examination and was studying at the Biological Institute on Helgoland in the summer of 1927. Hermann had recently published results on cellulose models and Voita was working on algae cell membranes. From that point on, they began collaborating on macromolecules.

Magda Staudinger studied macromolecules and their chemical structure and collaborated with Hermann for many years. In the 1940s she returned to applying macromolecule studies to biology, conducting trials from 1945 forward on living cells. In 1946, Hermann founded a journal to focus on developments in macromolecular chemistry, Makromolekulare Chemie, and Staudinger served on the editorial board of the journal. When Hermann received the Nobel Prize in Chemistry he acknowledged Magda's collaboration in his research. Between 1937 and 1956, she published 30 scientific papers on molecular mass and the microscopic evaluations of fiber morphology and colloids. Between 1969 and 1976, Staudinger edited and published seven volumes of the collected works of her husband.

After Hermann's death in 1965, she became president of the International Federation of University Women, serving until 1968. She strove for more recognition of women in science and joined UNESCO to further those aims in the 1970s, acting as president of the UNESCO German Science Commission from 1970 to 1975. She also was the first coordinator of the UNESCO Biosphere program. In 1990, she was made an honorary member of the Latvian Academy of Sciences and in 1991 she established a fund to assist those studying biology, chemistry and medicine in Latvia. In 1995, Staudinger set up a trust, the Magda and Hermann Staudinger Fund, for the benefit of retired members of the Latvian Academy of Sciences, to be used at the discretion of the academy for scholarships or other compensation. In 1996, she was awarded the Grand Order of the Latvian Academy of Sciences Medal.

Staudinger died in Freiburg im Breisgau on 21 April 1997 and was buried beside her husband at the Hauptfriedhof Freiburg Cemetery.

== Selected works ==
- Woit, Magda (1925). Umgestaltungen an Blattgeweben infolge des Wundreizes (u.d.T) (in German). University of Berlin.
- Staudinger, Magda (9 June 1942). "Der fibrilläre Bau natürlicher und künstlicher Cellulosefasern. 299. Mitteilung über makromolekulare Verbindungen". Journal für Praktische Chemie (in German). 160 (5–7): 203–216. doi:10.1002/prac.19421600505.
- Staudinger, Magda (1943). Mikroskopische und elektronenmikroskopische Untersuchungen an makromolekularen Stoffen (in German). Köthen, Germany: Verl. d. Chemiker-Zeitg. Otto von Halem.
- Staudinger, Magda (December 1944). "Über den Faserabbau im mikroskopischen Bild". Journal für Praktische Chemie (in German). 2 (1–5): 67–77. doi:10.1002/prac.19440020107.
- Rózsa, György; Staudinger, Magda (December 1944). "Elektronenmikroskopische untersuchungen an muskelproteinen1". Die Makromolekulare Chemie (in German). 2 (1): 66–76. doi:10.1002/macp.1948.020020105.
- Staudinger, Hermann; Staudinger, Magda (1954). Die makromolekulare Chemie und ihre Bedeutung für die Protoplasmaforschung (in German). Vienna, Austria: Springer. ISBN 978-3-211-80344-8.
- Staudinger, Magda (1969). Arbeiten über Isopren, Kautschuk und Balata. Das wissenschaftliche Werk von Hermann Staudinger (in German). Vol. 1. Basel, Switzerland: Huethig & Wepf Verlag.
- Staudinger, Magda (1972). Arbeiten über Cellulose und Cellulosederivate. Das wissenschaftliche Werk von Hermann Staudinger (in German). Vol. 2. Basel, Switzerland: Huethig & Wepf Verlag.
- Staudinger, Magda (1974). Arbeiten über synthetische makromolekulare Stoffe. Das wissenschaftliche Werk von Hermann Staudinger (in German). Vol. 3. Basel, Switzerland: Huethig & Wepf Verlag.
- Staudinger, Magda (1975). Arbeiten nach Sachgebieten geordnet. Das wissenschaftliche Werk von Hermann Staudinger (in German). Vol. 4. Basel, Switzerland: Huethig & Wepf Verlag.
- Staudinger, Magda (1975). Arbeiten allgemeiner Richtung. Das wissenschaftliche Werk von Hermann Staudinger (in German). Vol. 5. Basel, Switzerland: Huethig & Wepf Verlag. ISBN 9781566378086.
- Staudinger, Magda (1976). Arbeiten über Die Ketene. Das wissenschaftliche Werk von Hermann Staudinger (in German). Vol. 6. Basel, Switzerland: Huethig & Wepf Verlag.
- Staudinger, Magda (1976). Arbeiten über niedermolekulare organische Verbindungen. Das wissenschaftliche Werk von Hermann Staudinger (in German). Vol. 7. Basel, Switzerland: Huethig & Wepf Verlag.
- Staudinger, Magda (December 1971). ""The Biosphere". September-Ausgabe 1970 der Zeitschrift Scientific American, Band 223. Nr. 3., W. H. Freeman & Co., San Francisco". Biologie in unserer Zeit (in German). 1 (6): 189–190. doi:10.1002/biuz.19710010609. S2CID 86760058.
- Staudinger, Magda (10 August 1982). "Zur geschichte der zeitschrift "die makromolekulare chemie"". Die Makromolekulare Chemie (in German). 183 (8): 1829–1831. doi:10.1002/macp.1982.021830801.

== Bibliography ==
- Ogilvie, Marilyn Bailey; Harvey, Joy Dorothy (2000). The Biographical Dictionary of Women in Science: L-Z. New York, New York: Taylor & Francis. ISBN 978-0-415-92040-7.
- Percec, Virgil (2014). Hierarchical Macromolecular Structures: 60 Years after the Staudinger Nobel Prize I. New York, New York: Springer. ISBN 978-3-319-01137-0.
