= Leibniz Institute of Polymer Research Dresden =

Research institute in Germany

Leibniz-Institute of Polymer Research Dresden
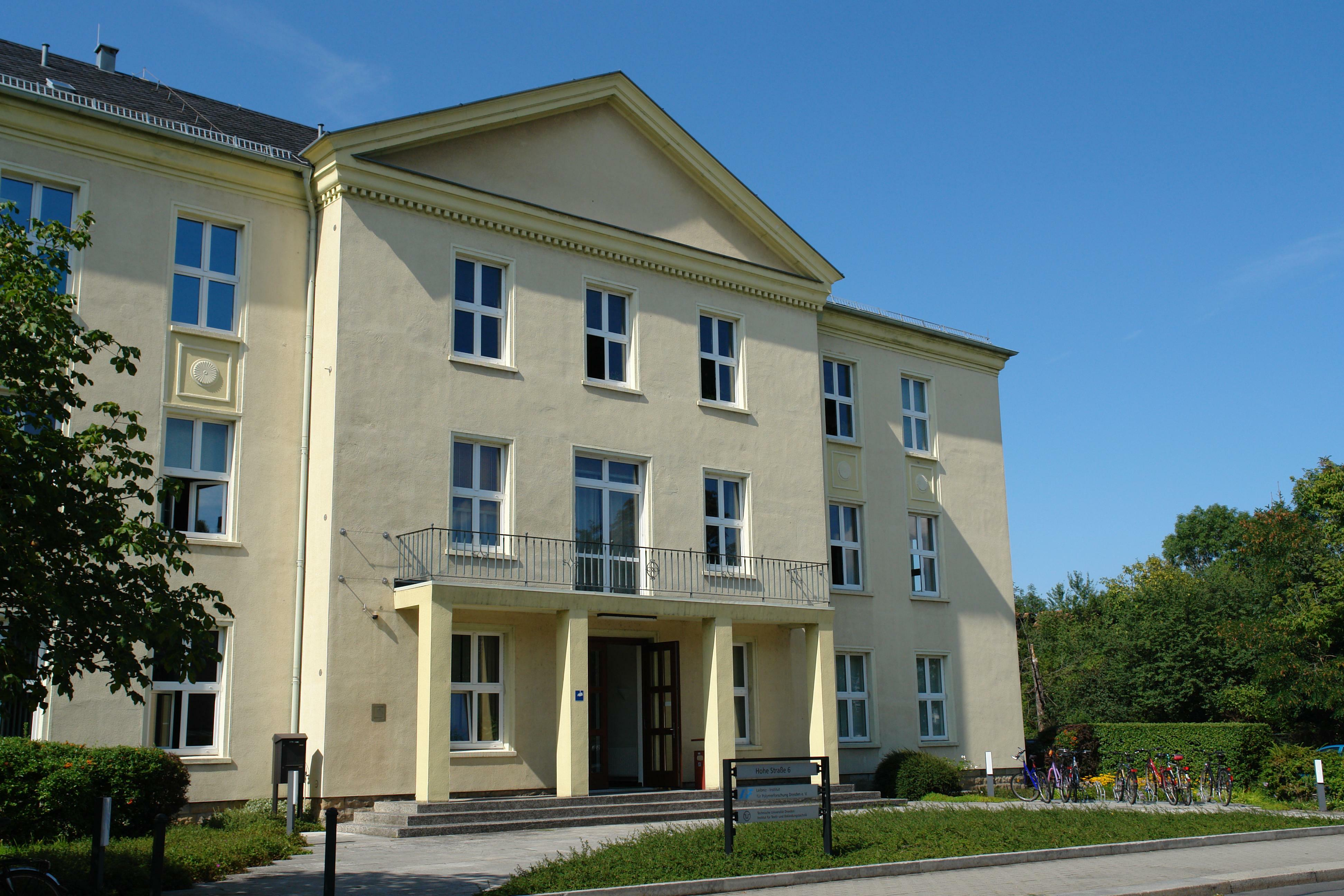
- Abbreviation: IPF
- Formation: 1992; 34 years ago 1948; 78 years ago
- Type: Scientific institute
- Purpose: Research in polymers
- Headquarters: Dresden, Saxony, Germany
- Key people: Prof. Dr. Carsten Werner (CSO)
- Parent organization: Leibniz Association
- Website: https://www.ipfdd.de/

The Leibniz Institute of Polymer Research Dresden in Dresden (German: Leibniz-Institut für Polymerforschung Dresden e.V.) – in short IPF Dresden – is a non-university research institute and a member of the Leibniz Association. The IPF is carrying out fundamental as well as application-oriented research in all areas of polymer science and investigates polymer materials with new or improved characteristics. In the material development, emphasis is given to nanotechnological aspects as well as to biosystem interfaces.

The research spectrum of the institute is very broad. It ranges from synthesis, analysis and modification of polymers to theory, modeling and processing of polymers. The institute's research results provide the basis for innovations in future technologies such as communication technology, medical technology, traffic engineering, energy generation and storage, and environment protection technologies.

== Research ==
The IPF's research program is jointly set up and implemented by researchers of the different IPF institutes. They address six strategic topics:

1. Basic concepts of soft matter
2. Bio-inspired materials
3. Functional materials and system integration
4. Process controlled structural materials
5. Data science-based material research
6. Sustainability and environment protection

== Structure ==
The IPF consists of five research institutes (program areas)

- Institute Macromolecular Chemistry, Director: Prof. Dr. Brigitte Voit
- Institute of Physical Chemistry and Polymer Physics, Director: Prof. Dr. Andreas Fery
- Institute of Polymer Materials, Director: Prof. Dr.-Ing. Markus Stommel
  - Research Area Elastomers, Head: Prof. Dr.-Ing. Sven Wießner
- Institute for Biofunctional Polymer Materials, Director: Prof. Dr. Carsten Werner
- Institute Theory of Polymers, Director: Prof. Dr. Jens-Uwe Sommer

== Cooperation/Networks ==
Close ties exists to the TU Dresden, one of eleven universities distinguished as a "University of Excellence" by the German Universities Excellence Initiative.

Due to joint appointments, the heads of the institutes and the research area simultaneously hold professorships at the Technische Universität Dresden (Faculties of Chemistry and Food Chemistry, Physics as well as Mechanical Science and Engineering). About 100 PhD students are permanently integrated in the research at the IPF and numerous diploma, master and bachelor theses are worked out and supervised here.

Common projects include the Max Bergmann Center of Biomaterials, the Center for Regenerative Therapies Dresden (CRTD) and the Center for Advancing Electronics Dresden (CfAED), the B CUBE - Center for Molecular and Cellular Bioengineering, the so-called Cluster of Excellence "Physics of Life", and the Else Kröner-Fresenius Center for Digital Health. The IPF is together with TU Dresden and other research institutes in Dresden member of the research alliance DRESDEN-concept that was founded due to the German Universities Excellence Initiative mentioned above.

== History ==
The IPF Dresden was founded on January 1, 1992, emerging from the largest polymer research center of the former GDR, which was at the time already internationally acknowledged. Since then the IPF Dresden developed into a leading institute in selected topics of polymer science.

As all Leibniz institutes, the IPF is evaluated at least every seven years. The last successful evaluation took place in 2022.

== Personnel/Budget ==
At present the IPF employs about 480 people. Scientists (chemists, physicists, biologists) and engineers work closely together. About 100 guest scientists from all over the world come every year for some weeks or months to work at the IPF. The institute supports young researchers, e.g. in establishing independent research groups.

The annual budget of about 26 Million Euro is supplied in equal parts by the Federal Republic of Germany and the German federal states. In addition to institutional funding the IPF Dresden raises project resources of about 10 Million Euro per year.

== Technology Transfer ==
In order to promote the transfer of research results into practice, the institute engages in technology transfer, promotes spin-offs and cooperates with industrial companies.
