= Georg Friedrich Nicolai =

German physiologist (1874–1964)

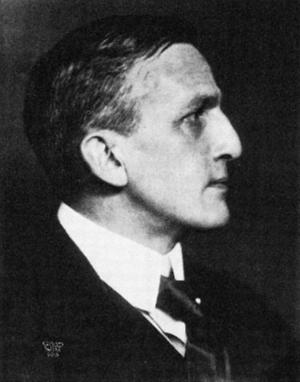
Georg Friedrich Nicolai (1874–1964)

Georg Friedrich Nicolai (born Lewinstein; 6 February 1874 – 8 October 1964) was a German physiologist.

== Biography ==
He was born in 1874 in Berlin. He studied at the University of Berlin, and later practiced medicine at the Charité in Berlin. He admired the works of physiologist Ivan Petrovich Pavlov, and with internist Friedrich Kraus, he published a book on electrocardiography titled Das Elektrokardiogramm des gesunden und kranken Menschen.

In 1914, at the onset of World War I, Nicolai composed an anti-war treatise called "Manifesto to the Europeans". Only three other intellectuals in Germany signed Nicolai's manifesto; they being physicist Albert Einstein, astronomer Wilhelm Julius Förster and philosopher Otto Buek.

During the war he published The Biology of War, an indictment of warfare which was translated into several languages. As a result, he was demoted and sent to the comparatively remote Tucheler Heide, West Prussia (Tuchola Forest) area. The Biology of War was praised by Romain Rolland, who became a friend of Nicolai.

In 1917, a Court-martial accused Nicolai to have violated a press law. The manuscript of Die Biologie des Krieges was smuggled to Switzerland; an unauthorized edition was published. His book (a pleading for a stable enduring peace between the nations) promptly became known in many European countries. The Oberste Heeresleitung (then the de facto government of Germany) started another lawsuit against him. Nicolai successfully organized a military plane and fled to Switzerland.

On 25 December 1918 he returned to Berlin. In 1920, he tried to lecture to again at the Charité, but rowdy nationalistic students hindered him.

In 1922 he emigrated to South America where he worked and taught in Argentina: the Physiology Department, School of Medicine, University of Cordoba, and later Chile.

In the 1930s he wrote Das Natzenbuch (A Natural History of National Socialist Movement and of Nationalism in General), in which he denounced nationalism as "one of the greatest, possibly greatest danger to the further development of the human race".

He died on 8 October 1964 in Santiago de Chile.

== See also ==
- List of peace activists

== Sources ==
- The Biology of War (1918) Full text at Internet Archive
- http://www.inst.at/trans/15Nr/10_5/10_5inhalt15.htm
- Herbert Gantschacher: The Limits of Virtual Reality or Our deal with the past and future
- Princeton University Press Manifesto to the Europeans
