= Leibniz-Institut für Festkörper- und Werkstoffforschung =

Research institution in Germany

Coordinates: 51.0261°N 13.7244°E

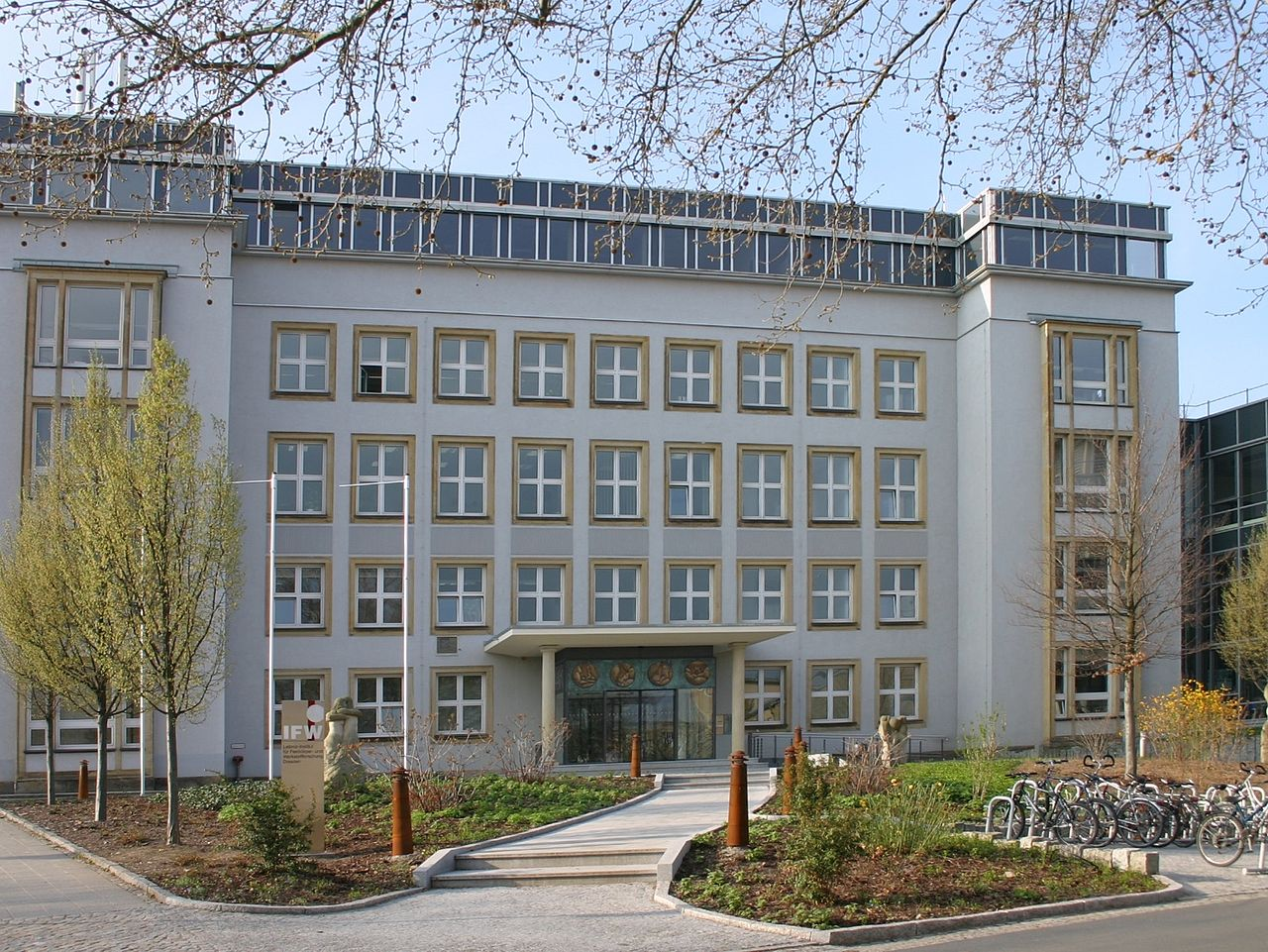
Leibniz Institute

The Leibniz Institute for Solid State and Materials Research in Dresden (German: Leibniz-Institut für Festkörper- und Werkstoffforschung Dresden) – in short IFW Dresden – Germany, is a non-university research institute and a member of the Gottfried Wilhelm Leibniz Scientific Community. It is concerned with modern materials science and combines explorative research in physics, chemistry and materials science with technological development of new materials and products.

== Research ==
The IFW’s research program is jointly set up and implemented by scientists of the different IFW institutes. It comprises the following five research areas:

- Superconductivity & superconductors
- Magnetism and magnetic materials
- Molecular Nanostructures and Molecular solids
- Metastable alloys
- Stress-driven architectures and phenomena

== Research institutes ==
The IFW consists of five research institutes

- Institute for Solid State Research, Director: Prof. Dr. Bernd Büchner
- Institute for Metallic Materials, Director: Prof. Dr. Kornelius Nielsch
- Institute for Materials Chemistry, Director: Prof. Dr. Anjana Devi
- Institute for Emerging Electronic Technologies, Director: Prof. Dr. Yana Vaynzof
- Institute for Theoretical Solid State Physics, Director: Prof. Dr. Jeroen van den Brink

== History ==
The IFW Dresden was founded on January 1, 1992 transforming the former Academy Institute to an Institute of the ‘Blaue Liste’. It emerged from the largest materials science center of the former GDR, which was at the time already internationally acknowledged. Since then the IFW developed into a leading institute in selected topics of materials science. The IFW is founding member of DRESDEN-concept, a research alliance in Dresden that was founded in 2010 to boost TU Dresden's application for the German Universities Excellence Initiative.

At present the IFW employs about 400 people, among them 190 scientists, mostly physicists, chemists and materials engineers. 80 of them are young scientists working in the IFW on their doctoral thesis. About 100 guest scientists from all over the world come every year for some weeks or months to work at the IFW. The annual budget of 23 Million Euro is supplied by the Federal government and by the German states in equal parts, the latter mainly by the Free State of Saxony. Additionally to institutional funding the IFW Dresden raises project resources of about 5 Million Euro per year.
