= Brigitte Voit =

German chemist (born 1963)

Brigitte Voit, born 1963 in Bayreuth, Germany, is a German chemist most known for her contributions and innovations in polymer research. As a researcher, she has produced over 600 publications in fields of materials science and chemistry, and is the Director of the Macromolecular Chemistry Division at Leibniz Institute of Polymer Research Dresden. She is also a professor with tenure at the Technische Universität Dresden since 1997.

== Early life and career ==
Voit completed her early education entirely in Germany. From 1982 to 1987, she attended the School of Chemistry at the University of Bayreuth, completing her university with a thesis in macromolecular chemistry. Advancing her academic career, in 1990, she earned her PhD in macromolecular chemistry.

A year later, she obtained a postdoctoral position at Kodak's research laboratories (then called Eastman Kodak) in Rochester, New York, USA (1991–1992). Afterwards, from 1992 to 1997, she went back to Germany to work as a research assistant at the Technical University of Munich (TUM). After gaining a habilitation at TUM in 1996, she became a full tenure professor at TU Dresden as well as the Director of Institute Macromolecular Chemistry at the Leibniz Institute of Polymer Research Dresden. In 2002, she was promoted to the Scientific Director, where she maintained leadership for 20 years.

== Inventions and Patents ==
Voit's inventions in polymer chemistry and synthetic materials, in the forms of new materials, methods, and technologies, have significantly advanced the applications of polymers, creating innovations in fields such as biomedicine and flexible electronics. By working towards highly controlled and functional polymers, she enabled materials to be applicable to a variety of causes.

One of her main innovations was hyperbranched polymers and dendritic materials with very controlled structures. These are synthetic molecules with many branches resembling a tree. While such concepts have been developed as early as the late 90s, they were difficult to produce or limited in applications. Voit's research made these materials more controllable and widely adaptable. She developed ways to design their structure with greater precision and to attach useful chemicals to them, expanding on previous studies.

Voit also innovated the drug delivery system using polymers that apply dendrimers and related structures. These systems act as carriers of drugs to move medicines through the body, allowing targeted application of medicines. While researchers have attempted various methods to complete the system, Voit improved on the customizability, enhancing the application of the drugs. For example, she engineered the carriers to interact with biological environments in specific ways, such as by heat, to make the release of medicines targeted. With regards to biomedical innovations, she has also worked on microcapsules with a polymeric capsule wall, and has received a patent for it in 1991.

Her contributions also pertain to fields of electronics and optical technology. She worked on polymers that can conduct electricity and interact with light, making it useful for displays and optical devices. In such innovations, while she was not the original creator, she made great contributions in terms of ease of attainment and improved performance. For example, one of the polymers she designed was printable and more compact, allowing the mass production of lighter materials.

== Impact ==
Through the studies of polymers with various characteristics and the resulting variety of products, Voit has had a wide impact on society.

In the medical field, the previously noted microcapsules with polymeric capsule walls that dissolve based on heat have been applied to countless medicines, recreating strategies for implementing nanomedicines. She has also created adhesive polymers to be used in dental materials, which allows longer-lasting adhesion between the dental material and the tooth, but also longer-lasting storage ability that makes transportation and storage easier. In other fields, her electricity-conducting, flexible polymers allowed for flexible and printable electronics, used in various displays.

Beyond the impact from her innovations, her influence on the fields of chemistry and materials science is exemplified through her academic career as a long-time professor at TU Dresden, her countless publications with over 33 thousand citations, and over 20 patents and applications.

Much of these studies and innovations are still in use and continue to be built upon. Her papers and studies are widely cited and form the foundation of various studies in the field. As her polymers are not commercialized therefore not protected like a normal good, scientists can continue to build on her work, attempting to recreate, modernize, or evolve it. In fact, given the nature of scientists that encourage building on others' works, it is very likely that her work will continue to be impactful even as better polymers or methods get produced and her findings become old.

== Honours and awards ==
In 2018, she was awarded the Hermann Staudinger Prize by the Gesellschaft Deutscher Chemiker in recognition of her achievements in macromolecular chemistry.

== Publications ==
Publications of Voit can be visited at google scholar and Web of Science.
