= Gianaurelio Cuniberti =

- Born: 28 April 1970 (age 56); Genoa, Italy
- Occupations: Professor; Physicist; Materials Scientist; Engineer
- Title: Chair
- Board member of: Materials Science and Nanotechnology at TU Dresden
- Awards: Schloeßmann Award (2001); Honorary professorship, POSTECH (effective 2009); Adjunct professorship, University of Alabama (effective 2011)

Academic background
- Education: Liceo Leonardo Da Vinci (BA); University of Genoa (PhD)
- Website: www.nano.tu-dresden.de/gc

Gianaurelio Cuniberti (born 28 April 1970) is an Italian scientist and professor at TU Dresden in Germany. Since 2007 he has been chair of Materials Science and Nanotechnology at the TU Dresden.

== Education ==
Professor Gianaurelio Cuniberti took his Diploma di Maturità (matriculation examination which can be compared to A-Level exams or Abitur.) in June 1989 at the Liceo Leonardo da Vinci in Genoa and studied physics at the University of Genoa between 1989 and 1994, where he obtained his bachelor's degree and masters in science. He received his PhD in 1997.

== Academic career ==
In 1994 he was a visiting scientist at MIT and in the period between 1997 and 1998 was postdoctoral research associate at the University of Genoa, Italy. He moved then to Germany, where he spent the years between 1998 and 2002 as guest scientist at the Max Planck Institute for the Physics of Complex Systems, Dresden, Germany (since 2001 as a Schloeßmann fellow). Between the years 2003 to 2008 he was head of the Volkswagen Foundation independent research group “Molecular Computing”, Department of Physics, University of Regensburg, Germany.

Since October 2017 Cuniberti has been full professor (W3) at TU Dresden, Germany.

He is part of the board of trustees of the Society of Friends of the Staatskapelle Dresden, one of the oldest orchestras in the word still performing with a top 10 reputation. He is member of the board of trustees of the Italien-Zentrum Dresden, a cultural platform for the exchange between Italy and Saxony. He also serves as a member of the board of trustees of the Italian Chamber of Commerce in Germany.

== Recognition ==
He was named a Fellow of the American Physical Society in 2022 "for pioneering computational and experimental works on low-dimensional structures and lasting contributions to the atom-to-system understanding of nanoelectronics devices".
