= Pyrethrin I =

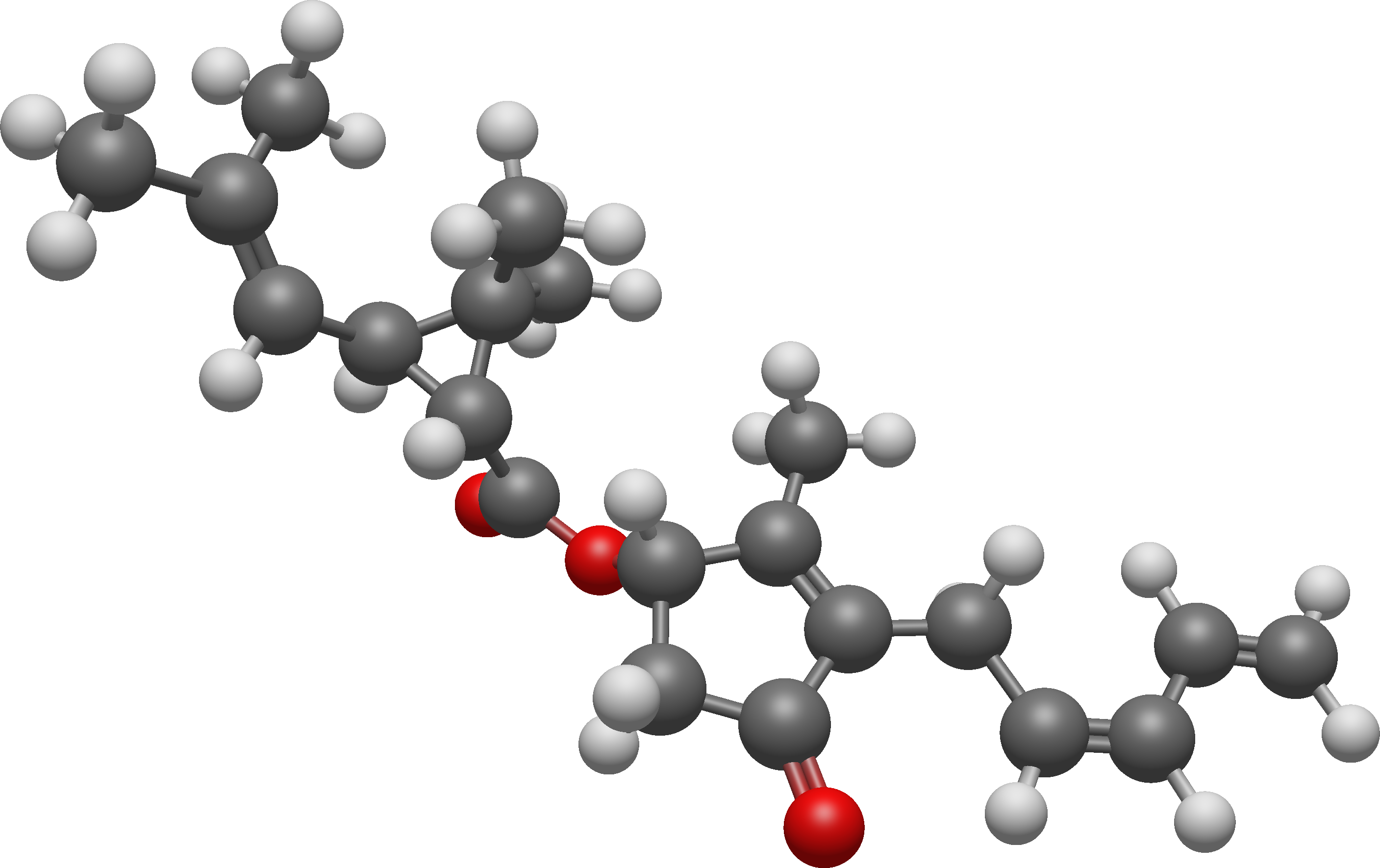

Names
- Preferred IUPAC name (1S)-2-Methyl-4-oxo-3-[(2Z)-penta-2,4-dien-1-yl]cyclopent-2-en-1-yl (1R,3R)-2,2-dimethyl-3-(2-methylprop-1-en-1-yl)cyclopropane-1-carboxylate

Identifiers
CAS Number	121-21-1
3D model (JSmol)	Interactive image
ChEBI	CHEBI:27815
ChemSpider	4444510
ECHA InfoCard	100.004.051
EC Number	204-455-8
KEGG	C07594; D08452
PubChem CID	5281045
UNII	T018I9EQOL
CompTox Dashboard (EPA)	DTXSID4034499
- InChI: InChI=1S/C21H28O3/c1-7-8-9-10-15-14(4)18(12-17(15)22)24-20(23)19-16(11-13(2)3)21(19,5)6/h7-9,11,16,18-19H,1,10,12H2,2-6H3/b9-8-/t16-,18+,19+/m1/s1 Key: ROVGZAWFACYCSP-VUMXUWRFSA-N
- SMILES: CC1=C(C(=O)C[C@@H]1OC(=O)[C@@H]2[C@H](C2(C)C)C=C(C)C)C/C=C\C=C

Properties
Chemical formula	C_{21}H_{28}O_{3}
Molar mass	328.44522

Hazards
- GHS labelling
Pictograms	(GHS07: Exclamation mark) (GHS09: Environmental hazard)
Signal word	Warning
Hazard statements	H302, H312, H332, H410
Precautionary statements	P261, P264, P270, P271, P273, P280, P301+P312, P302+P352, P304+P312, P304+P340, P312, P322, P330, P363, P391, P501
- Except where otherwise noted, data are given for materials in their standard state (at 25 °C [77 °F], 100 kPa). verify (what is ?) Infobox references

Pyrethrin I is one of the two pyrethrins, natural organic compounds with potent insecticidal activity. It is an ester of (+)-trans-chrysanthemic acid with (S)-(Z)-pyrethrolone.

== Total synthesis ==
The synthesis of pyrethrin I involves the esterification of (+)-trans-chrysanthemic acid with (S)-(Z)-pyrethrolone. One synthetic method for each of these is shown in the images below. Sobti and Dev of the Malti-Chem Research Centre in Nadesari, vadodara, India published this method for chrysanthemic acid in 1974. The starting material for the synthesis uses commercially available (+)-3α, 4α-epoxycarane (1). A lactone is eventually formed and the ring is opened by the use of a Grignard reagent to give (+)-trans-chrysanthemic acid. The preparation of (S)-pyrethrolone is essentially a 2 step synthesis. The starting material (S)-4-hydroxy-3-methyl-2-(2-propynyl)-2-cyclopenten-1-one (7) is also commercially available as the alcohol moiety of ETOC. Tetrakis(triphenylphosphine)palladium(0), copper(I) iodide, triethylamine, and vinyl bromide are added to (7) to add two more carbons and form (8). The final step is the addition of an activated zinc compound to reduce the triple carbon bond to form the cis product, (S)-pyrethrolone (9). Although no journal articles specify the combining of the alcohol and acid moieties of pyrethrin I, they could be combined through an esterification process to form the wanted product.

=== Synthesis of the acid moiety ===
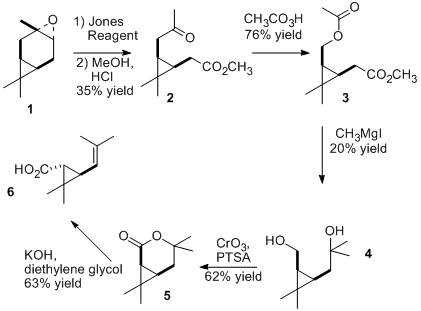

=== Synthesis of the alcohol moiety ===
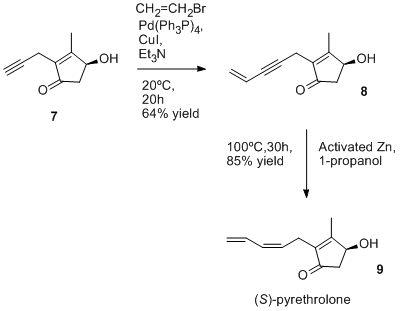
