= Werner Kern (chemist) =

German chemist (1906–1985)

Werner Kern (February 9, 1906 in Tiengen, southern Black Forest – January 18, 1985) was a German chemist.

== Life ==
Kern studied from 1924 to 1928 chemistry and physics in Freiburg and Heidelberg. The promotion took place in 1930 Hermann Staudinger, at which the habilitation on "The Poylacrylsäure, a model of the protein," followed. After a period in industrial research, he became in 1946 professor at the Johannes Gutenberg University of Mainz called in, where he retired 1974th Kern was in 1971 with Victor Günter Schulz of the first winner of the Hermann Staudinger price of the Gesellschaft Deutscher Chemiker.

Kern is considered one of the most important pioneers in the field of preparative macromolecular chemistry . His work in the field of formaldehyde polymer laid the foundation for industrial polymers, such as Hostaform C from Hoechst. Even in an article in 1938 on cross-linking copolymerization of acrylic acid with divinyl he laid the foundation for the core technology of today as "superabsorbent" designated products, for example in diapers are widely used.
