= Otto Buek =

German philosopher and translator (1873–1966)

Otto Buek (19 November 1873 – 1966) was a German philosopher and translator born in St. Petersburg.

He studied philosophy, chemistry and mathematics at the University of Heidelberg, and obtained his doctorate from the University of Marburg. Later he worked as a journalist in Berlin, where he translated works of Tolstoy, Unamuno and Alexander Herzen. Additionally, with Kurt Wildhagen (1871–1949), he edited works by Turgenev, Gogol and two volumes of Ernst Cassirer's edition of Kant's collected writings. During the 1920s, he worked as a correspondent for the Argentine newspaper La Nación.

From a philosophical standpoint, Buek was an advocate of neo-Kantianism, and as a young man was a disciple of Marburg philosopher Hermann Cohen (1848–1918). He was friends to physiologist and pacifist Georg Friedrich Nicolai (1874–1964), and only one of three intellectuals in Germany who signed Nicolai's 1914 anti-war counter-manifesto, Manifesto to the Europeans (Aufruf an die Europäer). The other two were physicist Albert Einstein and astronomer Wilhelm Julius Foerster.

== Selected publications ==
- Die Atomistik und Faradays Begriff der Materie ("Atomism and Faraday's concept of matter") in: Archiv für die Geschichte der Philosophie 18: 1904, 65-139; als Separatdruck auch: Reimer, Berlin 1905.
- Kritik des Marxismus ("Critique of Marxism") in: Die Aktion 1911, Spalte 1029–1033.
- Faradays System der Natur und seine begrifflichen Grundlagen ("Faraday's system of nature and its conceptual foundations") in: Philosophische Abhandlungen. Hermann Cohen zum 70sten Geburtstag dargebracht (4. Juli 1912); Cassirer, Berlin 1912.

== Bibliography ==
- Meyer-Rewerts, U.; Stöckmann, H. (2010). "Das ′Manifest der 93′: Ausdruck oder Negation der Zivilgesellschaft?". In Johanna Klatt; Robert Lorenz (eds.). Manifeste: Geschichte und Gegenwart des politischen Appells (in German). Bielefeld: Transcript Verlag. ISBN 978-3-83941-679-2.
