= List of Cassida species =

This is a list of 432 species in Cassida, a genus of tortoise beetles in the family Chrysomelidae.

== Cassida species ==
- Cassida abamita Spaeth, 1916
- Cassida achardi Spaeth, 1926
- Cassida acutangula Borowiec, 1999
- Cassida aethiopica Boheman, 1854
- Cassida agilis Spaeth, 1915
- Cassida albertisi (Spaeth, 1903)
- Cassida algirica Lucas, 1849
- Cassida alpina Bremi-Wolf, 1855
- Cassida alticola Chen & Zia, 1984
- Cassida altiuscula Spaeth, 1916
- Cassida amaranthica Medvedev & Eroshkina, 1988
- Cassida ambrica Borowiec, 1999
- Cassida amorifica Boheman, 1862
- Cassida amurensis (Kraatz, 1879)
- Cassida ancorifera Boheman, 1856
- Cassida andapaensis Borowiec, 1988
- Cassida andreinii Spaeth, 1933
- Cassida andrewesi Weise, 1897
- Cassida angusta Marseul, 1876
- Cassida angustifrons Weise, 1891
- Cassida antoni Borowiec & Swietojanska, 1997
- Cassida appluda Spaeth, 1926
- Cassida astrolabiana (Spaeth, 1903)
- Cassida atrata Fabricius, 1787
- Cassida atrofemorata Borowiec & Sassi, 2002
- Cassida atrorubra Borowiec, 1999
- Cassida atrosignata Sekerka & Borowiec, 2008
- Cassida aureola (Spaeth, 1915)
- Cassida auropustulata (Fairmaire, 1899)
- Cassida aurora Weise, 1907
- Cassida australica (Boheman, 1855)
- Cassida avia (Weise, 1897)
- Cassida azurea Fabricius, 1801
- Cassida bakeri Spaeth, 1925
- Cassida basicollis (Chen & Zia, 1964)
- Cassida basilana Spaeth, 1925
- Cassida bella Falderman, 1837
- Cassida belli Weise, 1897
- Cassida belliformis Maulik, 1919
- Cassida benguelica Spaeth, 1933
- Cassida beniowskii Borowiec, 1988
- Cassida bergeali Bordy, 1995
- Cassida berolinensis Suffrian, 1844
- Cassida bezdeki Borowiec, 2002
- Cassida bicallosa Spaeth, 1915
- Cassida biguttata (Spaeth, 1903)
- Cassida binorbis (Chen & Zia, 1961)
- Cassida blanda Spaeth, 1933
- Cassida brevis Weise, 1884
- Cassida brooksi Borowiec, 1992
- Cassida butterwecki Borowiec, 2007
- Cassida callosicollis Spaeth, 1926
- Cassida calvaria (Weise, 1900)
- Cassida camerunensis (Spaeth, 1903)
- Cassida canaliculata Laicharting, 1781
- Cassida capensis Borowiec, 2005
- Cassida catenata (Boheman, 1855)
- Cassida ceylonica (Boheman, 1855)
- Cassida chapuisi Spaeth, 1912
- Cassida cherenica Spaeth, 1917
- Cassida cherrapunjiensis Maulik, 1919
- Cassida chiangmaiensis Borowiec, 2001
- Cassida chrysanthemoides Borowiec & Swietojanska, 2001
- Cassida circassica Medvedev, 1962
- Cassida circumdata Herbst, 1799
- Cassida circumflexa Spaeth, 1926
- Cassida circumsepta Spaeth, 1915
- Cassida coagulata Boheman, 1854
- Cassida coelebs Borowiec, 1999
- Cassida cognobilis Spaeth, 1926
- Cassida collucens Spaeth, 1915
- Cassida compuncta (Boheman, 1855)
- Cassida concallescens Spaeth, 1915
- Cassida concha Solsky, 1872
- Cassida conchyliata (Spaeth, 1914)
- Cassida consobrina Spaeth, 1915
- Cassida conspurcata Boheman, 1854
- Cassida corallina Boheman, 1862
- Cassida corbetti (Weise, 1897)
- Cassida cordula Boheman, 1854
- Cassida corollata Spaeth, 1940
- Cassida corruptrix Spaeth, 1914
- Cassida cristobalensis (Spaeth, 1936)
- Cassida crucifera (Kraatz, 1879)
- Cassida culminis (Chen & Zia, 1964)
- Cassida currax Spaeth, 1915
- Cassida deflorata Suffrian, 1844
- Cassida dehradunensis Borowiec & Takizawa, 1991
- Cassida delenifica Boheman, 1862
- Cassida delesserti Boheman, 1854
- Cassida deltoides Weise, 1889
- Cassida dembickyi Borowiec, 2001
- Cassida denticollis Suffrian, 1844
- Cassida denticulata Boheman, 1856
- Cassida depicta Boheman, 1862
- Cassida derasa Spaeth, 1940
- Cassida desultrix (Spaeth, 1940)
- Cassida devalaensis Borowiec & Takizawa, 1991
- Cassida devylderi Spaeth, 1928
- Cassida diomma Boisduval, 1835
- Cassida diops (Chen & Zia, 1964)
- Cassida discalis Gressitt, 1938
- Cassida distinguenda Spaeth, 1928
- Cassida dohertyi Spaeth, 1926
- Cassida dolens Borowiec, 1999
- Cassida dorsalis (Boheman, 1855)
- Cassida dorsonotata Boheman, 1854
- Cassida dorsovittata Boheman, 1854
- Cassida drakensbergensis Borowiec, 2005
- Cassida dulcis (Boheman, 1862)
- Cassida ellipticollis Spaeth, 1914
- Cassida elongata Weise, 1893
- Cassida eluta Boheman, 1862
- Cassida enervis Boheman, 1862
- Cassida eoa (Spaeth, 1928)
- Cassida excaecata Spaeth, 1933
- Cassida exilis Boheman, 1854
- Cassida eximia Borowiec & Ghate, 2004
- Cassida expansa Gressitt, 1952
- Cassida expressa (Spaeth, 1914)
- Cassida fausti Spaeth & Reitter, 1926
- Cassida feae Spaeth, 1904
- Cassida ferranti Spaeth, 1915
- Cassida ferruginea Goeze, 1777
- Cassida flaveola Thunberg, 1794 (pale tortoise beetle)
- Cassida flavoguttata Spaeth, 1914
- Cassida flavoscutata Spaeth, 1914
- Cassida flavosignata Spaeth, 1932
- Cassida foveolatipennis Borowiec & Swietojanska, 2001
- Cassida franklinmuelleri Spaeth, 1925
- Cassida frontalis Boheman, 1856
- Cassida fukhanica Medvedev & Eroshkina, 1988
- Cassida fumida Spaeth, 1914
- Cassida fuscomacula Borowiec, 1988
- Cassida fuscorufa Motschulsky, 1866
- Cassida fuscosignata Boheman, 1854
- Cassida fuscosparsa Boheman, 1854
- Cassida gansuica Chen & Zia, 1964
- Cassida gentilis Spaeth, 1926
- Cassida ghesquieri Spaeth, 1943
- Cassida gilva Weise, 1901
- Cassida ginpinica (Chen & Zia, 1961)
- Cassida glabella Boheman, 1854
- Cassida glebicolor Spaeth, 1926
- Cassida goudoti (Boheman, 1855)
- Cassida granula Boheman, 1856
- Cassida granulicollis Spaeth, 1905
- Cassida guttipennis Boheman, 1862
- Cassida hablitziae Motschulsky, 1838
- Cassida hainanensis Yu, 2002
- Cassida hemisphaerica Herbst, 1799
- Cassida hexastigma Suffrian, 1844
- Cassida hova (Weise, 1910)
- Cassida hovacassiformis Borowiec, 1999
- Cassida humeralis Kraatz, 1874
- Cassida humerosa Spaeth, 1902
- Cassida hyalina Weise, 1891
- Cassida icterica Boheman, 1854
- Cassida ictericiformis Borowiec, 2009
- Cassida imbecilla (Boheman, 1862)
- Cassida imitatrix Spaeth, 1916
- Cassida immaculicollis (Chen & Zia, 1961)
- Cassida imparata Gressitt & Kimoto, 1963
- Cassida impompalis Spaeth, 1924
- Cassida inaequalis Thomson, 1858
- Cassida incallida Spaeth, 1938
- Cassida inciens Spaeth, 1926
- Cassida inconstans (Fairmaire, 1899)
- Cassida indochinensis (Spaeth, 1919)
- Cassida inflaccens Spaeth, 1940
- Cassida inflata Gressitt, 1952
- Cassida informis Boheman, 1862
- Cassida innotata Boheman, 1854
- Cassida inopinata Sassi & Borowiec, 2006
- Cassida inquinata Brullé, 1832
- Cassida insulana Gressitt, 1952
- Cassida irregularis Boheman, 1854
- Cassida irrorata Weise, 1898
- Cassida isarogensis Borowiec, 2009
- Cassida jacobsoni Spaeth, 1914
- Cassida japana Baly, 1874
- Cassida javanica (Boheman, 1855)
- Cassida johnsoni Borowiec, 1988
- Cassida juglans Gressitt, 1942
- Cassida justa Spaeth, 1914
- Cassida kinabaluensis Borowiec, 1999
- Cassida koreana Borowiec & Cho, 2011
- Cassida kunminica (Chen & Zia, 1964)
- Cassida labiatophaga Medvedev & Eroshkina, 1988
- Cassida lacrymosa Boheman, 1854
- Cassida laetabilis Spaeth, 1915
- Cassida laetifica Weise, 1910
- Cassida langeri Borowiec, 2009
- Cassida laotica Borowiec, 2002
- Cassida latecincta Fairmaire, 1904
- Cassida lateritia Fairmaire, 1904
- Cassida leucanthemi Bordy, 1995
- Cassida limpopoana Borowiec & Swietojanska, 2001
- Cassida lineola Creutzer, 1799
- Cassida linnavuorii Borowiec, 1986
- Cassida liquefacta Spaeth, 1912
- Cassida litigiosa Boheman, 1854
- Cassida lombocensis (Spaeth, 1919)
- Cassida lueboensis Spaeth, 1932
- Cassida luxuriosa Spaeth, 1940
- Cassida luzonica Spaeth, 1933
- Cassida lycii Borowiec & Swietojanska, 2001
- Cassida lyrica Fairmaire, 1904
- Cassida madagascarica Borowiec, 1999
- Cassida magilensis Spaeth, 1926
- Cassida major Kraatz, 1874
- Cassida malaysiana Borowiec, 2010
- Cassida mandli Spaeth, 1921
- Cassida manipuria Maulik, 1923
- Cassida margaritacea Schaller, 1783
- Cassida mariaeadelheidae Spaeth, 1915
- Cassida mashonensis Spaeth, 1928
- Cassida medvedevi Lopatin, 1965
- Cassida melanophthalma Boheman, 1854
- Cassida mera Germar, 1848
- Cassida mindanaoensis Spaeth, 1933
- Cassida mishmiensis Sekerka & Borowiec, 2008
- Cassida mongolica Boheman, 1854
- Cassida montana Borowiec, 1999
- Cassida monticola Borowiec, 1988
- Cassida moori Boheman, 1856
- Cassida morondaviana Borowiec, 2007
- Cassida mroczkowskii Borowiec & Swietojanska, 1997
- Cassida murraea Linnaeus, 1767
- Cassida mysorensis Borowiec & Swietojanska, 1996
- Cassida namibiensis Borowiec, 2005
- Cassida natalensis Spaeth, 1932
- Cassida navicella Boheman, 1862
- Cassida nebulosa Linnaeus, 1758
- Cassida nepalica Medvedev, 1977
- Cassida nigriventris Boheman, 1854
- Cassida nigrocastanea (Chen & Zia, 1964)
- Cassida nigrodentata Medvedev & Eroshkina, 1988
- Cassida nigroflavens Borowiec, 1988
- Cassida nigrogibbosa Spaeth, 1901
- Cassida nigrohumeralis Borowiec & Ghate, 2004
- Cassida nigroramosa (Chen & Zia, 1964)
- Cassida nigroscutata Fairmaire, 1904
- Cassida nilgirica Spaeth, 1914
- Cassida nobilis Linnæus, 1758
- Cassida nucula Spaeth, 1914
- Cassida nuwara Maulik, 1919
- Cassida nysea Spaeth, 1926
- Cassida obenbergeri (Spaeth, 1928)
- Cassida oberlaenderi Spaeth, 1916
- Cassida obtusata Boheman, 1854
- Cassida occursans Spaeth, 1914
- Cassida olympica Sekerka, 2005
- Cassida ovalis Spaeth, 1914
- Cassida pacholatkoi Sekerka & Borowiec, 2008
- Cassida pagana (Boheman, 1855)
- Cassida paiensis Borowiec, 2001
- Cassida palaestina Reiche, 1858
- Cassida paliji Matis, 1970
- Cassida pallidicollis Boheman, 1856
- Cassida pannonica Suffrian, 1844
- Cassida panzeri Weise, 1907
- Cassida parvula Boheman, 1854
- Cassida patruelis Spaeth, 1935
- Cassida pauliani Borowiec, 1999
- Cassida pauxilla Boheman, 1854
- Cassida pellegrini Marseul, 1868
- Cassida penelope Boheman, 1862
- Cassida pernix Spaeth, 1917
- Cassida perplexa (Chen & Zia, 1961)
- Cassida persica Spaeth, 1926
- Cassida persicana Borowiec, 1999
- Cassida pfefferi Sekerka, 2006
- Cassida physodes (Boheman, 1855)
- Cassida piperata Hope, 1842
- Cassida plausibilis (Boheman, 1862)
- Cassida plicatula Fairmaire, 1904
- Cassida polymeriae Borowiec & Burwell, 2011
- Cassida postarcuata (Chen & Zia, 1964)
- Cassida praensis Borowiec, 2001
- Cassida prasina Illiger, 1798
- Cassida pretiosa Borowiec, 1988
- Cassida probata Spaeth, 1914
- Cassida procurva Spaeth, 1924
- Cassida propitia Boheman, 1862
- Cassida prospera Spaeth, 1915
- Cassida pseudosyrtica Medvedev & Eroshkina, 1988
- Cassida pubescens Spaeth, 1905
- Cassida pubipennis Borowiec, 1999
- Cassida pudens Boheman, 1854
- Cassida pulpa Spaeth, 1915
- Cassida pulvinata Boheman, 1854
- Cassida purpuricollis (Spaeth, 1914)
- Cassida pusilla Waltl, 1839
- Cassida pusio Spaeth, 1915
- Cassida pyrenaea Weise, 1893
- Cassida quadricolorata Borowiec, 1999
- Cassida quadriramosa Gressitt, 1952
- Cassida quatuordecimsignata Spaeth, 1899
- Cassida queenslandica Borowiec, 2006
- Cassida quinaria (Chen & Zia, 1964)
- Cassida quinquemaculata Boheman, 1854
- Cassida rati Maulik, 1923
- Cassida ratina (Chen & Zia, 1964)
- Cassida recondita (Boheman, 1862)
- Cassida reitteri Weise, 1892
- Cassida relicta Spaeth, 1927
- Cassida reticulicosta (Chen & Zia, 1964)
- Cassida reticulipennis Borowiec & Swietojanska, 2001
- Cassida rhodesiaca Spaeth, 1928
- Cassida ribbei (Spaeth, 1919)
- Cassida rimosa (Boheman, 1854)
- Cassida rothschildi Spaeth, 1922
- Cassida rubiginosa Müller, 1776 (thistle tortoise beetle)
- Cassida rubripennis Borowiec, 2002
- Cassida rubromaculata Spaeth, 1918
- Cassida rubroornata (Boheman, 1855)
- Cassida rudicollis (Spaeth, 1915)
- Cassida rufomicans Fairmaire, 1904
- Cassida rufovirens Suffrian, 1844
- Cassida rugipennis (Boheman, 1855)
- Cassida ruralis (Boheman, 1862)
- Cassida sabahensis Swietojanska & Borowiec, 2002
- Cassida saginata Spaeth, 1914
- Cassida samangana (Spaeth, 1919)
- Cassida sanguineoguttata Spaeth, 1915
- Cassida sanguinicollis (Spaeth, 1926)
- Cassida sanguinolenta Müller, 1776
- Cassida sanguinosa Suffrian, 1844
- Cassida sappho (Boheman, 1862)
- Cassida sareptana Kraatz, 1873
- Cassida saucia Weise, 1889
- Cassida sauteri (Spaeth, 1913)
- Cassida schawalleri Medvedev, 1990
- Cassida schenklingi (Spaeth, 1915)
- Cassida schoutedeni Spaeth, 1932
- Cassida scymnoides Borowiec, 1999
- Cassida seladonia Gyllenhal, 1827
- Cassida semipunctata Chen & Zia, 1964
- Cassida senicula (Spaeth, 1915)
- Cassida seniculoides Borowiec, 1999
- Cassida septemdecimpunctata (Boheman, 1855)
- Cassida seraphina Ménétries, 1836
- Cassida sexguttata Boisduval, 1835
- Cassida sigillata (Gorham, 1885)
- Cassida signifera Weise, 1905
- Cassida silvicola Borowiec, 1998
- Cassida simanica (Chen & Zia, 1961)
- Cassida smaragdocruciata Medvedev & Eroshkina, 1982
- Cassida socialis Spaeth, 1926
- Cassida sodalis (Chen & Zia, 1964)
- Cassida solida Spaeth, 1940
- Cassida somalica Spaeth, 1941
- Cassida spaethi Weise, 1900
- Cassida spaethiana Gressitt, 1952
- Cassida spartea Shaw, 1961
- Cassida spatiosa Spaeth, 1928
- Cassida sphaerula Boheman, 1854
- Cassida spissa Weise, 1897
- Cassida stevensi Sekerka, 2011
- Cassida stigmatica Suffrian, 1844
- Cassida strejceki Sekerka, 2006
- Cassida strigaticollis Borowiec, 1988
- Cassida strumosa (Spaeth, 1915)
- Cassida stupa Maulik, 1919
- Cassida suaveola (Spaeth, 1915)
- Cassida subacuticollis Borowiec, 1999
- Cassida sublesta (Weise, 1904)
- Cassida subprobata (Chen & Zia, 1964)
- Cassida subreticulata Suffrian, 1844
- Cassida subtilis Weise, 1897
- Cassida successiva Spaeth, 1924
- Cassida sulphurago Boheman, 1854
- Cassida sulphurea Boheman, 1854
- Cassida sussamyrica Spaeth, 1926
- Cassida syrtica Boheman, 1856
- Cassida taediosa Boheman, 1856
- Cassida tarda Weise, 1899
- Cassida tenasserimensis Spaeth, 1926
- Cassida tenax Spaeth, 1915
- Cassida tenuicula Boheman, 1856
- Cassida thailandica Borowiec, 2001
- Cassida thomsoni Boheman, 1862
- Cassida tianshanica Borowiec & Swietojanska, 2001
- Cassida timefacta Boheman, 1856
- Cassida timorensis Borowiec, 1995
- Cassida tosta Klug, 1835
- Cassida transcaucasica Borowiec & Swietojanska, 2001
- Cassida trepidula Spaeth, 1932
- Cassida triangulum (Weise, 1897)
- Cassida troglodytes Boheman, 1854
- Cassida trossula Spaeth, 1915
- Cassida truncatipennis (Spaeth, 1914)
- Cassida tsaratanana Borowiec, 1988
- Cassida tsinlinica Chen & Zia, 1964
- Cassida tuberculata Medvedev & Eroshkina, 1988
- Cassida tumidicollis (Chen & Zia, 1961)
- Cassida turcmenica Weise, 1892
- Cassida umbonata Borowiec, 1999
- Cassida undecimnotata Gebler, 1841
- Cassida unica Swietojanska & Borowiec, 2002
- Cassida unicatenata (Weise, 1910)
- Cassida unimaculata Boheman, 1854
- Cassida uniorbis (Chen & Zia, 1961)
- Cassida vafra Boheman, 1862
- Cassida variabilis (Chen & Zia, 1961)
- Cassida varians Herbst, 1799
- Cassida varicornis (Spaeth, 1912)
- Cassida velaris Weise, 1896
- Cassida verrucata (Boheman, 1855)
- Cassida versicolor (Boheman, 1855)
- Cassida vesicularis Thunberg, 1787
- Cassida vespertilio Boheman, 1862
- Cassida vespertina Boheman, 1862
- Cassida vibex Linnaeus, 1767
- Cassida vicinalis (Spaeth, 1915)
- Cassida vietnamica Medvedev & Eroshkina, 1988
- Cassida virguncula Weise, 1889
- Cassida viridiguttata (Chen & Zia, 1964)
- Cassida viridinotata (Boheman, 1855)
- Cassida viridipennis Boheman, 1854
- Cassida viridis Linnæus, 1758
- Cassida vitalisi (Spaeth, 1928)
- Cassida vittata Villiers, 1789
- Cassida weinmanni Chapuis, 1880
- Cassida weisei (Jacobson, 1894)
- † Cassida blancheti Heer, 1856
- † Cassida dufouri Piton, 1936
- † Cassida hermione Heer, 1847
- † Cassida interemta von Heyden, 1862
- † Cassida kramstae Förster, 1891
- † Cassida megapenthes Heer, 1847
