= Cassida leucanthemi =

Scientific classification
- Kingdom: Animalia
- Phylum: Arthropoda
- Class: Insecta
- Order: Coleoptera
- Suborder: Polyphaga
- Infraorder: Cucujiformia
- Family: Chrysomelidae
- Genus: Cassida
- Species: C. leucanthemi

Binomial name
- Cassida leucanthemi Bordy, 1995

Synonyms
- Cassida leucanthemi Bordy, 1995

Species of beetle

Cassida leucanthemi is a species of beetle in the leaf beetle family, that can be found in Austria, the Czech Republic, France, Italy (Liguria), Poland, and Spain. The host plants are Asteraceae species, including Leucanthemum vulgare, Carduus argemose and Carduus obtusisquamosus. It also feeds on Caryophyllaceae species, particularly Silene nutans.
