= Cassida bergeali =

Scientific classification
- Kingdom: Animalia
- Phylum: Arthropoda
- Class: Insecta
- Order: Coleoptera
- Suborder: Polyphaga
- Infraorder: Cucujiformia
- Family: Chrysomelidae
- Genus: Cassida
- Species: C. bergeali

Binomial name
- Cassida bergeali Bordy, 1995

Synonyms
- Cassida bergeali Bordy, 1995

Species of beetle

Cassida bergeali is a species of beetle in the leaf beetle family, found in Austria, the Czech Republic, France, Germany, Poland and Slovakia.

== Description ==
The females are larger than males.

== Habitat ==
The species feeds on plants in the family Asteraceae, particularly Centaurea jacea.
