= Mongolocampe zhaoningi =

Scientific classification
- Domain: Eukaryota
- Kingdom: Animalia
- Phylum: Arthropoda
- Class: Insecta
- Order: Hymenoptera
- Family: Tetracampidae
- Genus: Mongolocampe
- Species: M. zhaoningi

Binomial name
- Mongolocampe zhaoningi Yang, 1990

Species of wasp

Mongolocampe zhaoningi is a species of Hymenoptera from the Tetracampidae family. The scientific name of this species was first published in 1990 by Yang.
