= Mongolocampe =

Scientific classification
- Domain: Eukaryota
- Kingdom: Animalia
- Phylum: Arthropoda
- Class: Insecta
- Order: Hymenoptera
- Family: Tetracampidae
- Genus: Mongolocampe; Sugonjaev, 1971

Species
- See text

Genus of wasps

Mongolocampe is a genus of wasps from the Tetracampidae family, first described in 1971.

== Species ==
There are 4 species in the genus:

- Mongolocampe bouceki (Sugonjaev, 1971)
- Mongolocampe kozlovi (Sugonjaev, 1971)
- Mongolocampe trjapitzini (Sugonjaev, 1971)
- Mongolocampe zhaoningi (Yang, 1990)
