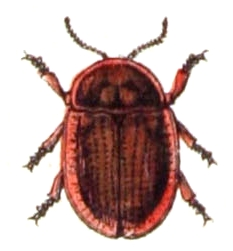

Scientific classification
- Kingdom: Animalia
- Phylum: Arthropoda
- Class: Insecta
- Order: Coleoptera
- Suborder: Polyphaga
- Infraorder: Cucujiformia
- Family: Chrysomelidae
- Genus: Cassida
- Species: C. canaliculata

Binomial name
- Cassida canaliculata Laicharting, 1781

Synonyms
- Cassida canaliculata Laicharting, 1781; Cassida speciosa Brahm, 1790; Cassida austriaca Fabricus, 1792; Cassida graminis Suffrian, 1844; Cassida immutabilis Suffrian, 1844; Cassida austriaca var. illyrica Boheman, 1854

= Cassida canaliculata =

Species of beetle

Cassida canaliculata is a species of beetle in the leaf beetle family, that can be found in Central, West and Eastern Europe, as well as the Caucasus, Turkey, West Kazakhstan and North Italy.

== Habitat ==
The species feeds on plants in the family Lamiaceae, such as Salvia pratensis and Salvia verticillata.
