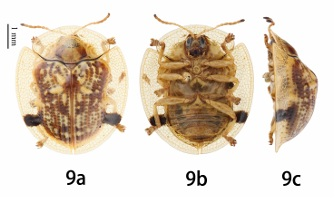

Scientific classification
- Kingdom: Animalia
- Phylum: Arthropoda
- Class: Insecta
- Order: Coleoptera
- Suborder: Polyphaga
- Infraorder: Cucujiformia
- Family: Chrysomelidae
- Genus: Cassida
- Species: C. versicolor

Binomial name
- Cassida versicolor (Boheman, 1855)

Synonyms
- Coptocycla versicolor Boheman, 1855; Coptocycla thais Boheman, 1862; Thlaspida chinensis Gressitt, 1938

= Cassida versicolor =

Species of beetle

Cassida versicolor is a species of beetle in the family Chrysomelidae. This species is found in China (Fujian, Guangdong, Guangxi, Guizhou, Hainan, Heilongjiang, Hubei, Hunan, Jiangxi, Sichuan, Yunnan, Zhejiang), Taiwan, Japan, Laos, Myanmar, North Korea the Russian Far East and Vietnam.

Adults have an elliptical body. The elytral disc is dark brown, interspersed with prominent pale yellow spots.
