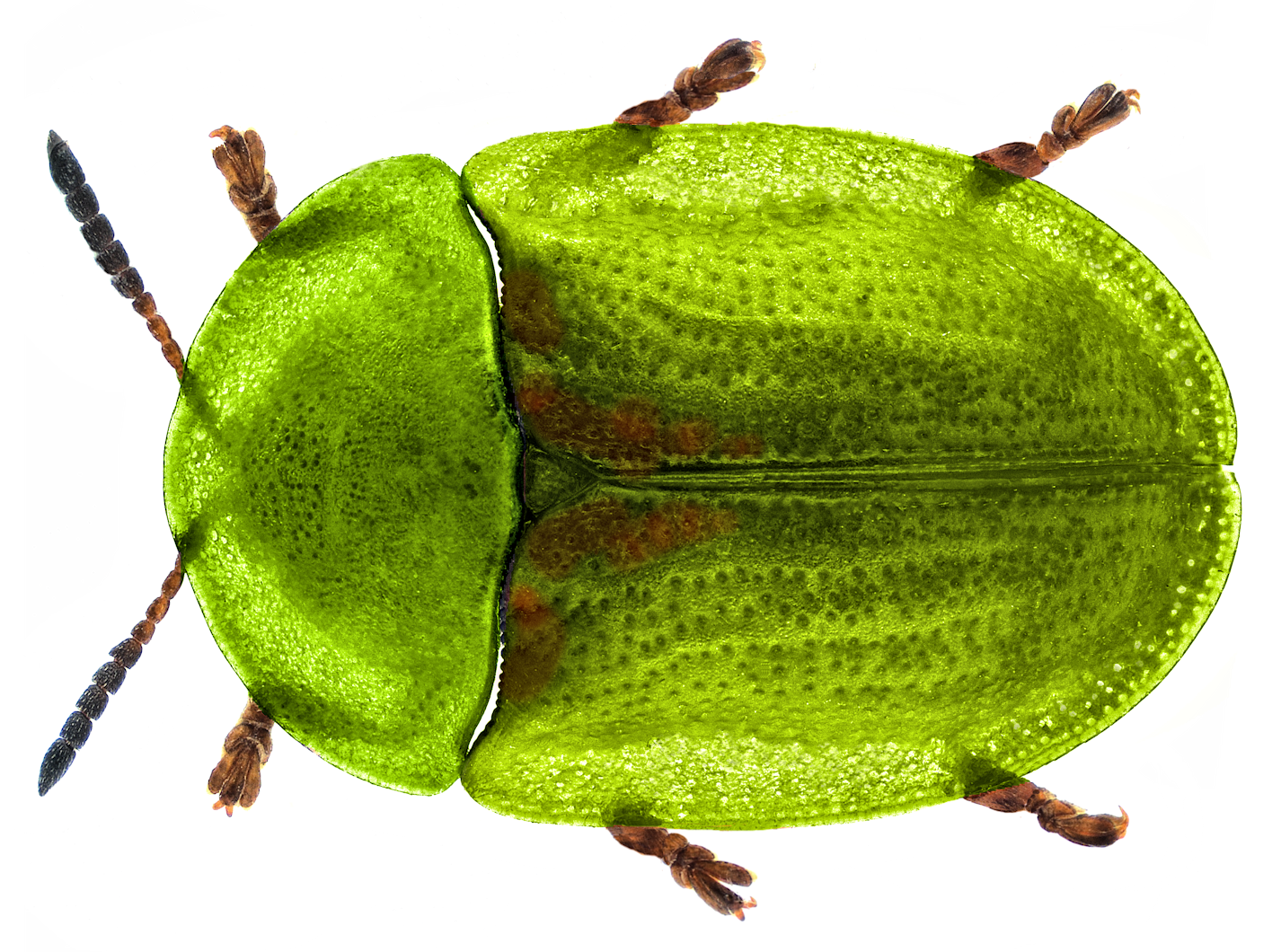

Scientific classification
- Kingdom: Animalia
- Phylum: Arthropoda
- Class: Insecta
- Order: Coleoptera
- Suborder: Polyphaga
- Infraorder: Cucujiformia
- Family: Chrysomelidae
- Genus: Cassida
- Species: C. denticollis

Binomial name
- Cassida denticollis Suffrian, 1844

Synonyms
- Cassida denticollis Suffrian, 1844; Cassida denticollis var. fuscicollis Weise, 1893; Cassida prasina mongolensis Medvedev, 1957

= Cassida denticollis =

Species of beetle

Cassida denticollis is a species of leaf beetle, situated in the subfamily Cassidinae (tortoise beetles) and the genus Cassida, found in Mongolia, West China (Xinjiang province), and the Western Palaearctic region.

== Description ==
Cassida denticollis, like all species of Cassida has its head covered by the pronotum and wide elytral margins. It measures 5.1–7.0 mm in length, is green in colour with brownish-red areas around the scutellum. It has a distinct tooth at the rear edge of the pronotum, and a series of small, strong, blunt teeth on the front edges of the elytra from which this species derives its name.

== Habitat and lifecycle ==
The species feeds on plants from the family Asteraceae, including Achillea millefolium, Artemisia absinthium, Artemisia campestris and various plants Tanacetum species, including Tanacetum corymbosum and Tansy.
