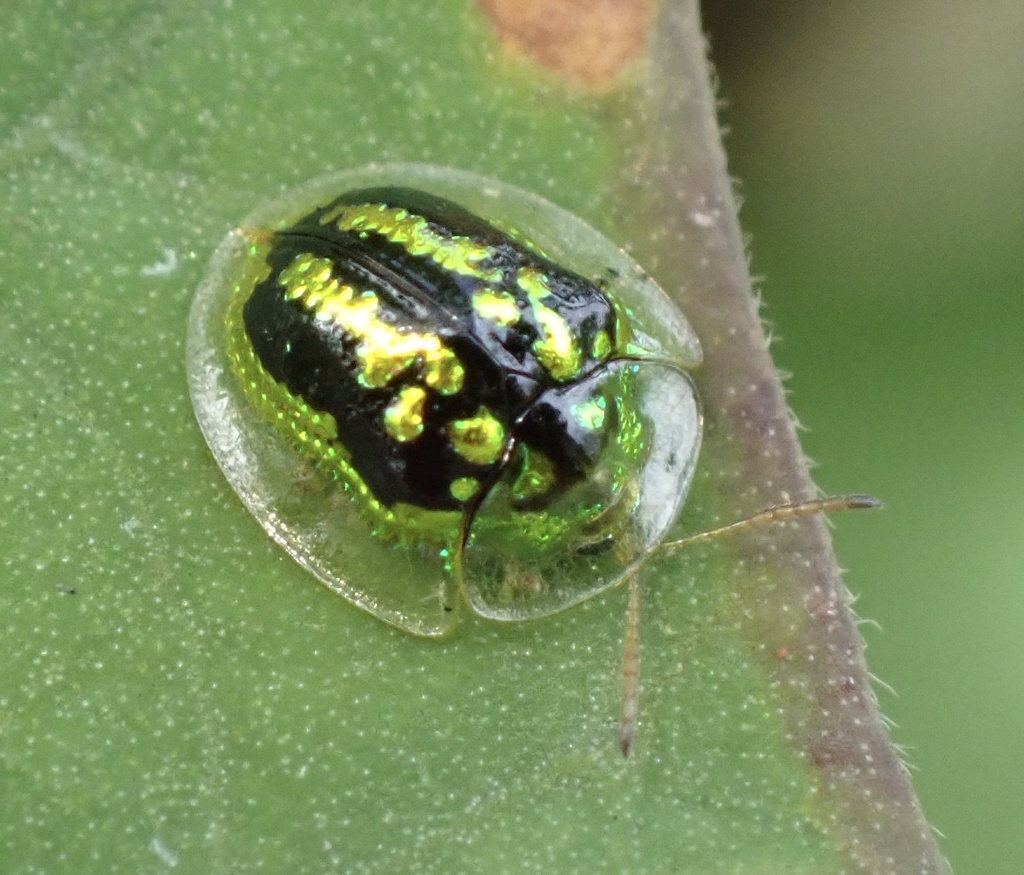

Scientific classification
- Kingdom: Animalia
- Phylum: Arthropoda
- Clade: Pancrustacea
- Class: Insecta
- Order: Coleoptera
- Suborder: Polyphaga
- Infraorder: Cucujiformia
- Family: Chrysomelidae
- Subfamily: Cassidinae
- Tribe: Cassidini
- Genus: Cassida
- Species: C. circumdata

Binomial name
- Cassida circumdata Herbst, 1799

Synonyms
- Cassida trivittata Fabricius, 1801; Cassida u-fuscum Wiedemann, 1823; Aspidomorpha effusa Boheman, 1854; Coptocycla luzonica Eschscholtz: Gemminger & Harold 1876; Metriona circumdata ab. pescadorensis Chûjô 1934; Cassida cuticula Gressitt, 1938; Cassida nilgiriensis Borowiec & Takizawa, 1991

= Cassida circumdata =

Species of tortoise beetle

Cassida circumdata is a species of tortoise beetle in the family Chrysomelidae. It is found in Indomalaya and the South Pacific islands.

== Description ==
Cassida circumdata is metallic green with compound green eyes.

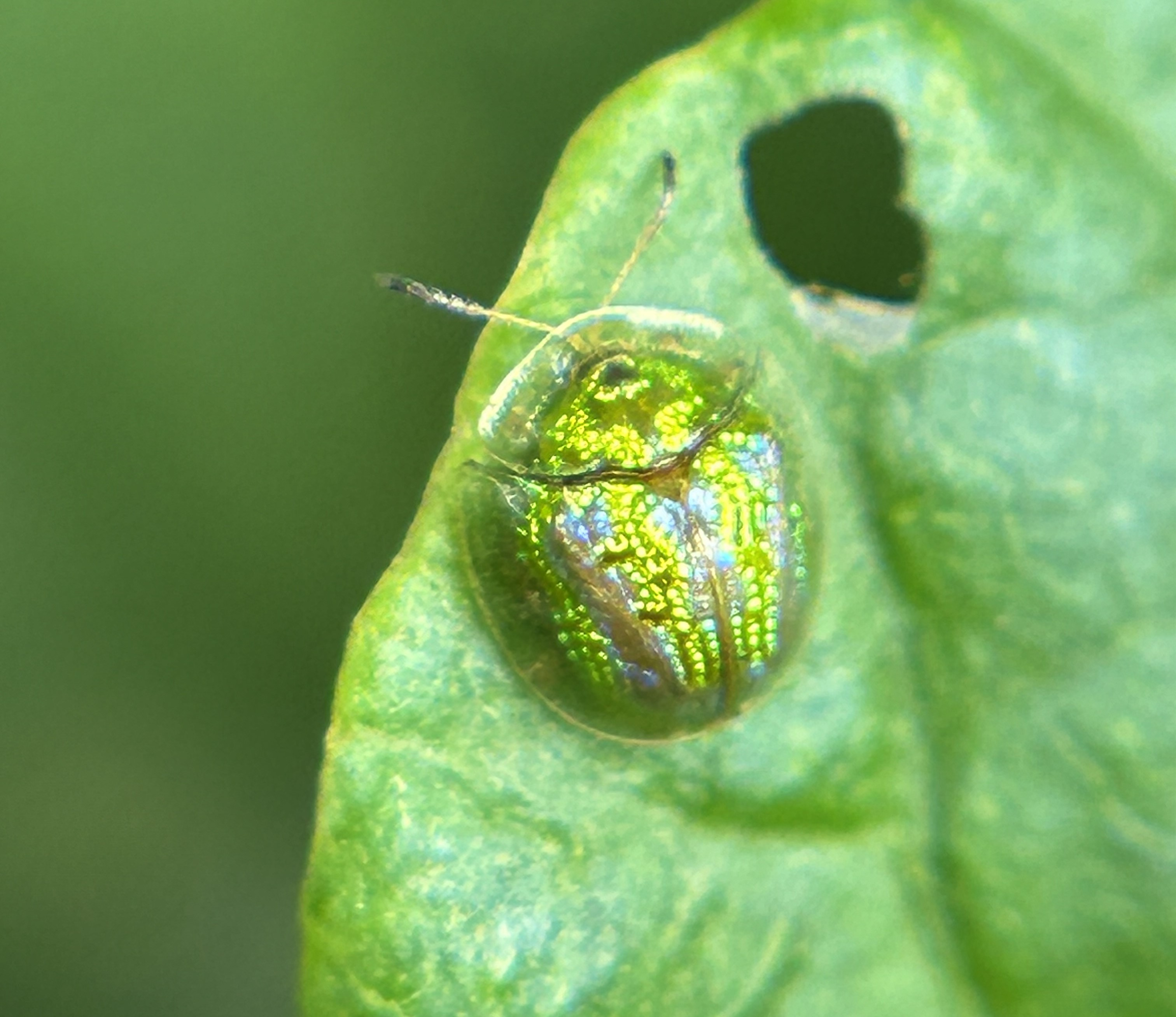
A Cassida circumdata beetle without black stripes

== Biology ==
The incubation period is about 2 to 6 days.

The species is often used in biological control of harmful plants of Convolvulaceae in the field.

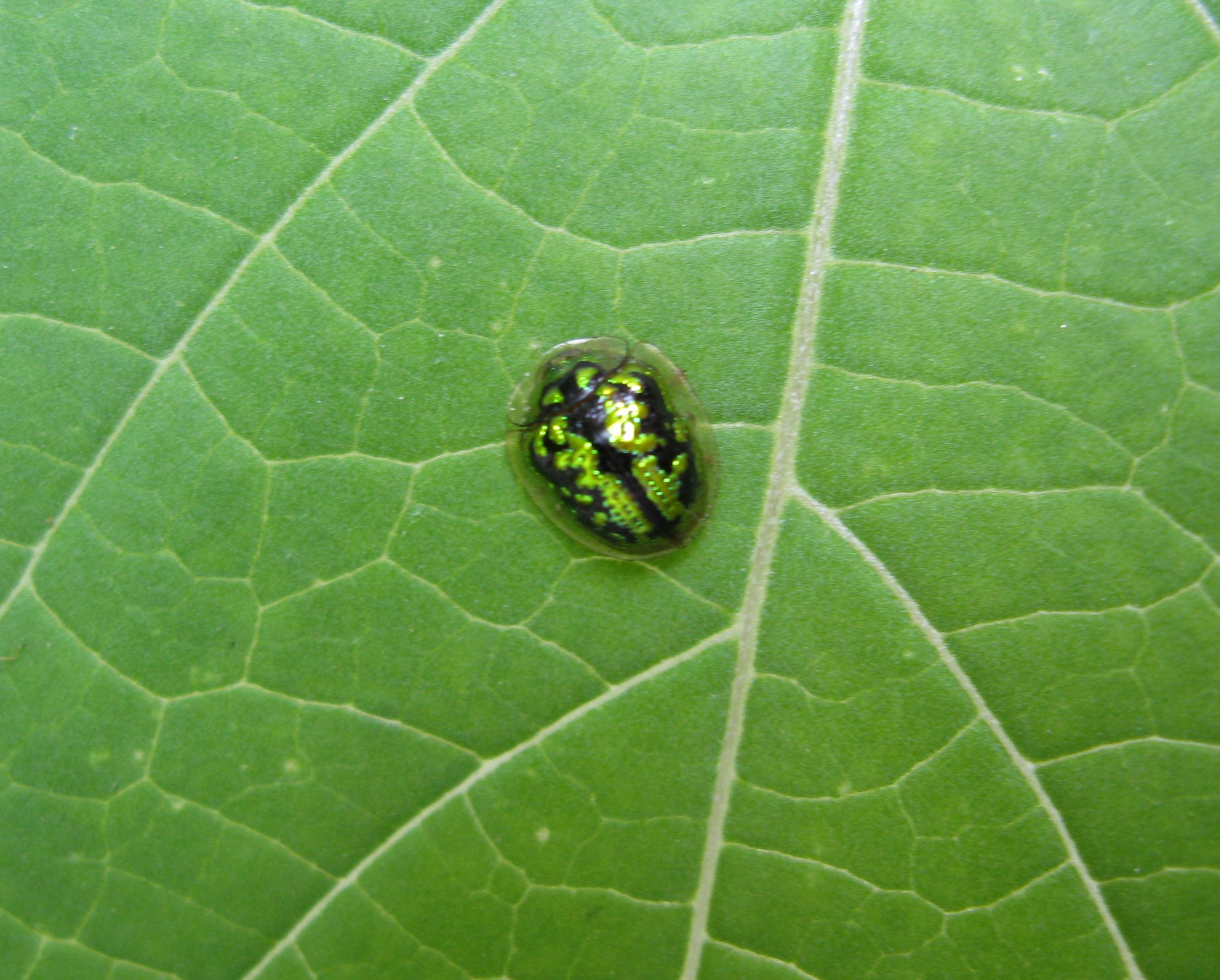
Cassida circumdata
