= Cassida sareptana =

Scientific classification
- Kingdom: Animalia
- Phylum: Arthropoda
- Class: Insecta
- Order: Coleoptera
- Suborder: Polyphaga
- Infraorder: Cucujiformia
- Family: Chrysomelidae
- Genus: Cassida
- Species: C. sareptana

Binomial name
- Cassida sareptana Kraatz, 1874

Synonyms
- Cassida sareptana Kraatz, 1874

Species of beetle

Cassida sareptana is a species of brownish beetle in the leaf beetle family, found in Kazakhstan, Mongolia, Russia and Ukraine. They can be found in Near East as well. The species feeds on plants from the family Asteraceae, including tarragon and Artemisia arenaria.
