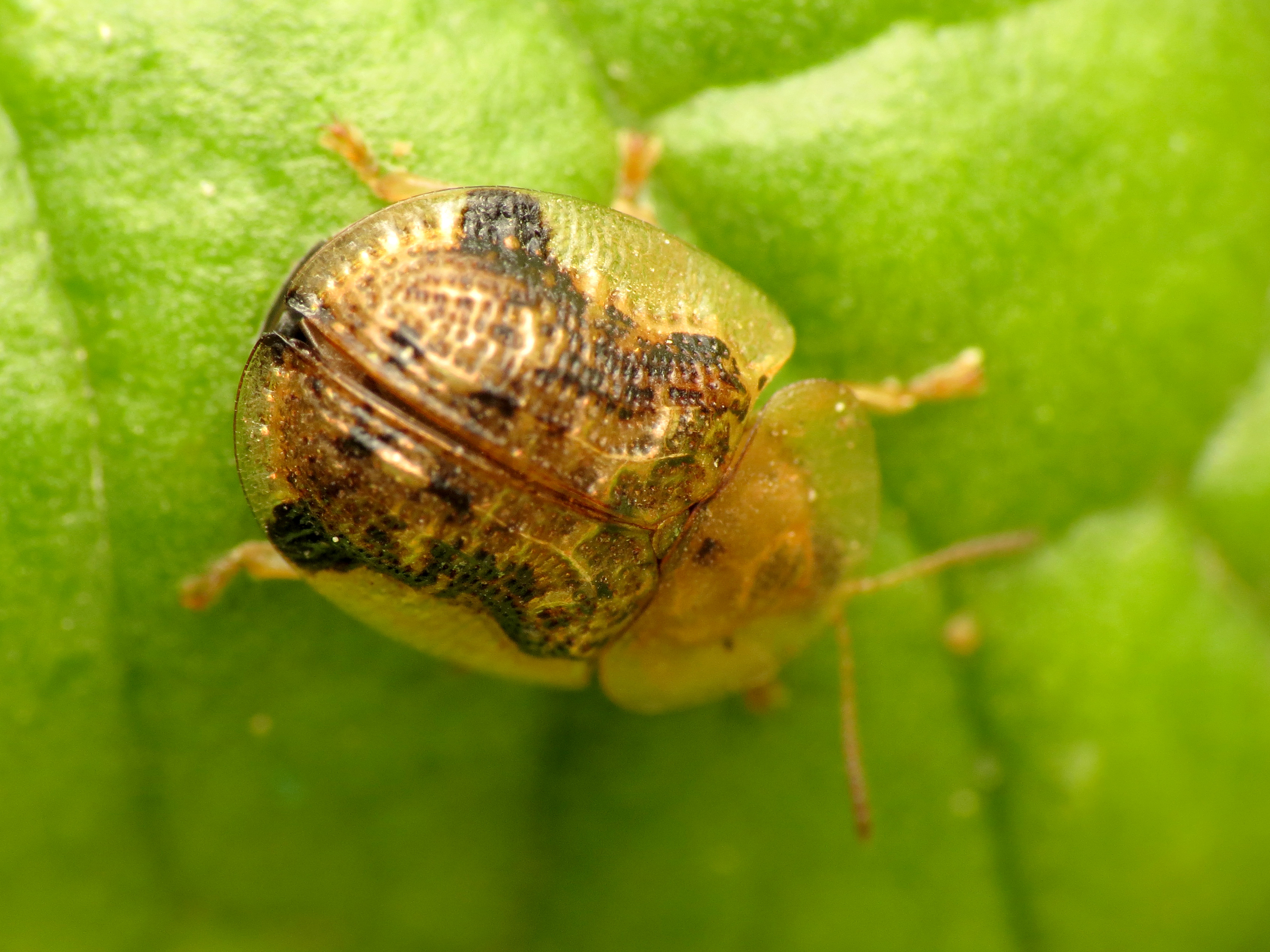

Scientific classification
- Kingdom: Animalia
- Phylum: Arthropoda
- Class: Insecta
- Order: Coleoptera
- Suborder: Polyphaga
- Infraorder: Cucujiformia
- Family: Chrysomelidae
- Genus: Cassida
- Species: C. piperata

Binomial name
- Cassida piperata Hope, 1842

= Cassida piperata =

Species of beetle

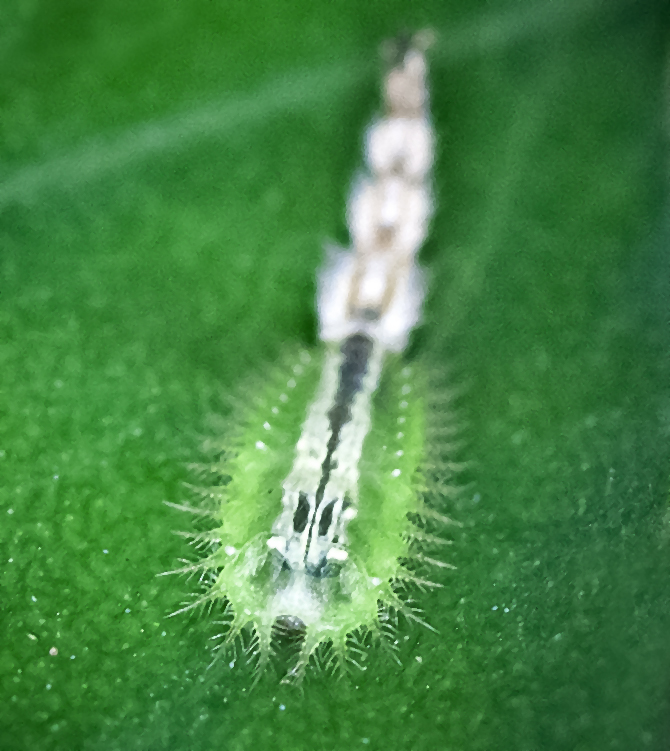
Cassida piperata larva

Cassida piperata is a species of beetle in the leaf beetle family. It is native to eastern Asia, but it has also been reported from the United States as an alien species.

== Description ==
The females are bigger than males.
