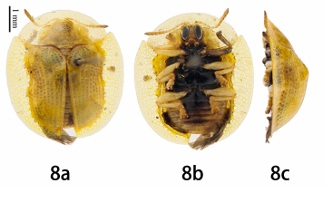

Scientific classification
- Kingdom: Animalia
- Phylum: Arthropoda
- Class: Insecta
- Order: Coleoptera
- Suborder: Polyphaga
- Infraorder: Cucujiformia
- Family: Chrysomelidae
- Genus: Cassida
- Species: C. obtusata

Binomial name
- Cassida obtusata (Boheman, 1854)

Synonyms
- Cassida juno Boheman, 1862; Cassida pusillula Boheman, 1862; Cassida interstitialis Spaeth, 1901; Cassida residua Weise, 1901; Cassida (Odontionycha) picifrons Weise, 1908

= Cassida obtusata =

Species of beetle

Cassida obtusata, is a species of leaf beetle widespread in Oriental region from Sri Lanka to China towards Sumatra and the Philippines.

== Distribution ==
It if found in Cambodia, Sri Lanka, China, Japan, India, Indonesia, Laos, Malaysia, Myanmar, Nepal, the Philippines, Taiwan, Thailand, and Vietnam.

== Biology ==
Adults have been observed from several plants such as, Amaranthus, Citrus and Passiflora edulis.
