= Cassida butterwecki =

Scientific classification
- Kingdom: Animalia
- Phylum: Arthropoda
- Class: Insecta
- Order: Coleoptera
- Suborder: Polyphaga
- Infraorder: Cucujiformia
- Family: Chrysomelidae
- Genus: Cassida
- Species: C. butterwecki

Binomial name
- Cassida butterwecki Borowiec, 2007

Species of beetle

Cassida butterwecki is a species of leaf beetle, situated in the subfamily Cassidinae (tortoise beetles) and the genus Cassida. It was described as a new species in 2007 from specimens collected in Madagascar in 1990.
