= Cassida cognobilis =

Scientific classification
- Kingdom: Animalia
- Phylum: Arthropoda
- Class: Insecta
- Order: Coleoptera
- Suborder: Polyphaga
- Infraorder: Cucujiformia
- Family: Chrysomelidae
- Genus: Cassida
- Species: C. cognobilis

Binomial name
- Cassida cognobilis Spaeth, 1926

Species of beetle

Cassida (Crepidaspis) cognobilis, is a species of leaf beetle found in India, Sri Lanka, Laos and Thailand.
