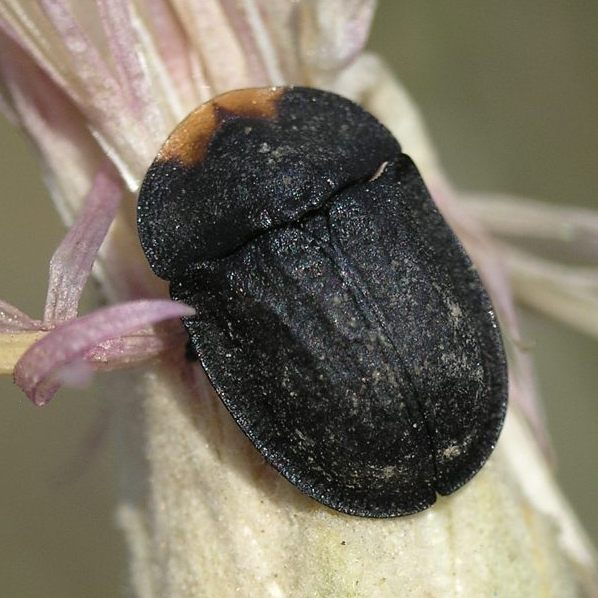

Scientific classification
- Kingdom: Animalia
- Phylum: Arthropoda
- Class: Insecta
- Order: Coleoptera
- Suborder: Polyphaga
- Infraorder: Cucujiformia
- Family: Chrysomelidae
- Genus: Cassida
- Species: C. atrata

Binomial name
- Cassida atrata Fabricius, 1787

Synonyms
- Cassida atrata Fabricius, 1787

= Cassida atrata =

Species of beetle

Cassida atrata is a beetle in the leaf beetle family, that can be found in Central and SE Europe. The host plants are in the family Lamiaceae and include Salvia glutinosa and Salvia pratensis.
