= Cassida malaysiana =

Scientific classification
- Kingdom: Animalia
- Phylum: Arthropoda
- Class: Insecta
- Order: Coleoptera
- Suborder: Polyphaga
- Infraorder: Cucujiformia
- Family: Chrysomelidae
- Genus: Cassida
- Species: C. malaysiana

Binomial name
- Cassida malaysiana Borowiec, 2010

Species of beetle

Cassida malaysiana is a species of leaf beetle, situated in the subfamily Cassidinae (tortoise beetles) and the genus Cassida. It was described as a new species in 2010 from specimens collected in Malaysia in 2005.

== Description ==
Cassida malaysiana measures 4.8–5.4 mm in length. It has a yellow pronotum with a large black spot at the base and on the disc. The elytra are black with pale yellow/orange spots throughout. Males are slightly smaller and stouter than females.
