= Cassida relicta =

Scientific classification
- Kingdom: Animalia
- Phylum: Arthropoda
- Class: Insecta
- Order: Coleoptera
- Suborder: Polyphaga
- Infraorder: Cucujiformia
- Family: Chrysomelidae
- Genus: Cassida
- Species: C. relicta

Binomial name
- Cassida relicta Spaeth, 1927

Species of beetle

Cassida relicta is a species of tortoise beetle in the family Chrysomelidae. It is found in North America.
