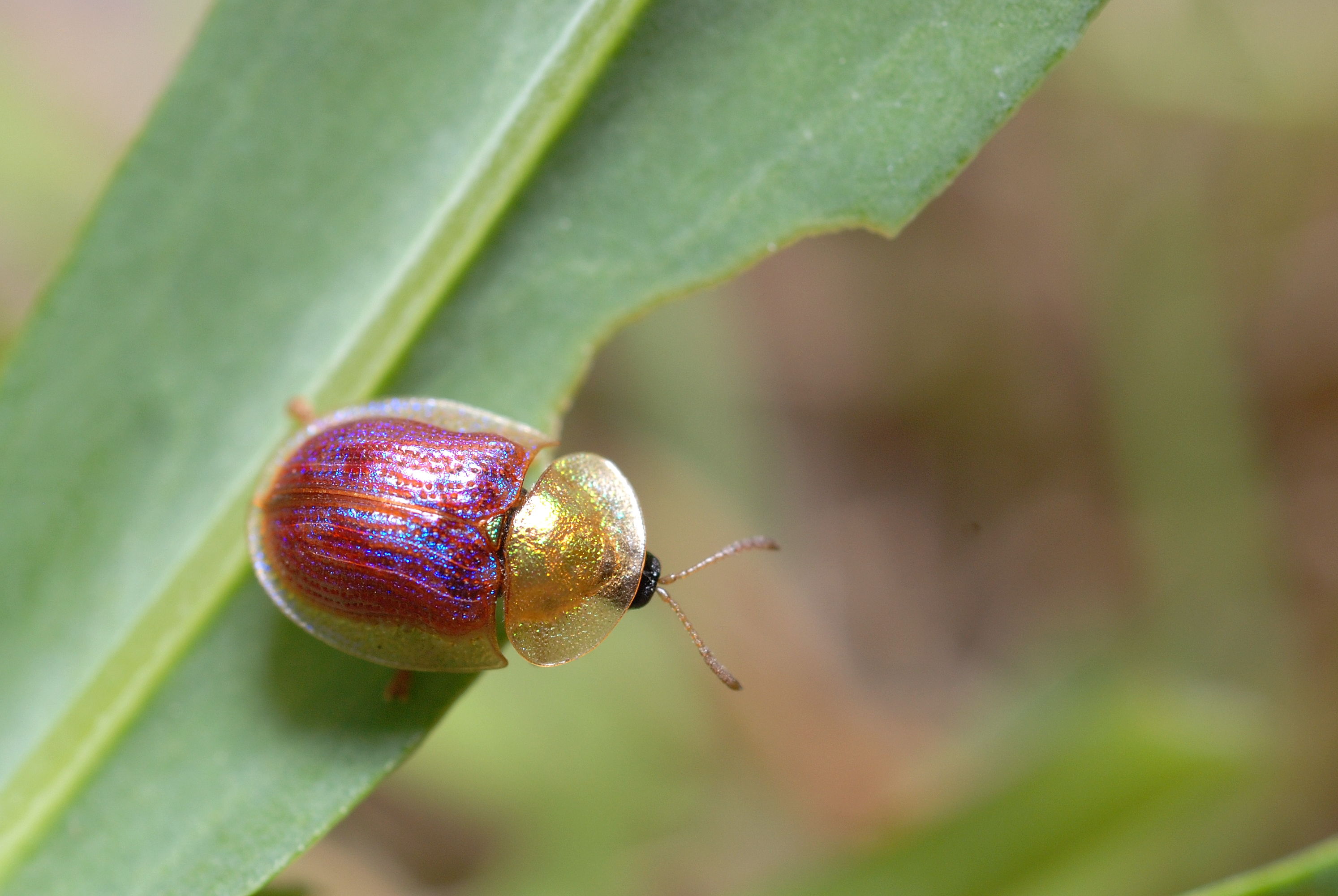

Scientific classification
- Kingdom: Animalia
- Phylum: Arthropoda
- Class: Insecta
- Order: Coleoptera
- Suborder: Polyphaga
- Infraorder: Cucujiformia
- Family: Chrysomelidae
- Genus: Cassida
- Species: C. azurea

Binomial name
- Cassida azurea Fabricius, 1801

= Cassida azurea =

Species of beetle

Cassida azurea is a species of tortoise beetle in the family Chrysomelidae. It is found in Europe and Northern Asia (excluding China). Has been introduced in North America to control the invasive plant Silene vulgaris.
