= Cassida prasina =

Scientific classification
- Kingdom: Animalia
- Phylum: Arthropoda
- Class: Insecta
- Order: Coleoptera
- Suborder: Polyphaga
- Infraorder: Cucujiformia
- Family: Chrysomelidae
- Genus: Cassida
- Species: C. prasina

Binomial name
- Cassida prasina Illiger, 1798

Synonyms
- Cassida prasina Illiger, 1798; Cassida viridana Herbst, 1799; Cassida chloris Suffrian, 1844

Species of beetle

Cassida prasina is a greenish coloured beetle in the leaf beetle family.

== Distribution ==
The species is found in the western Palearctic realm and from East to West China, including the provinces of Jilin and Xinjiang.
