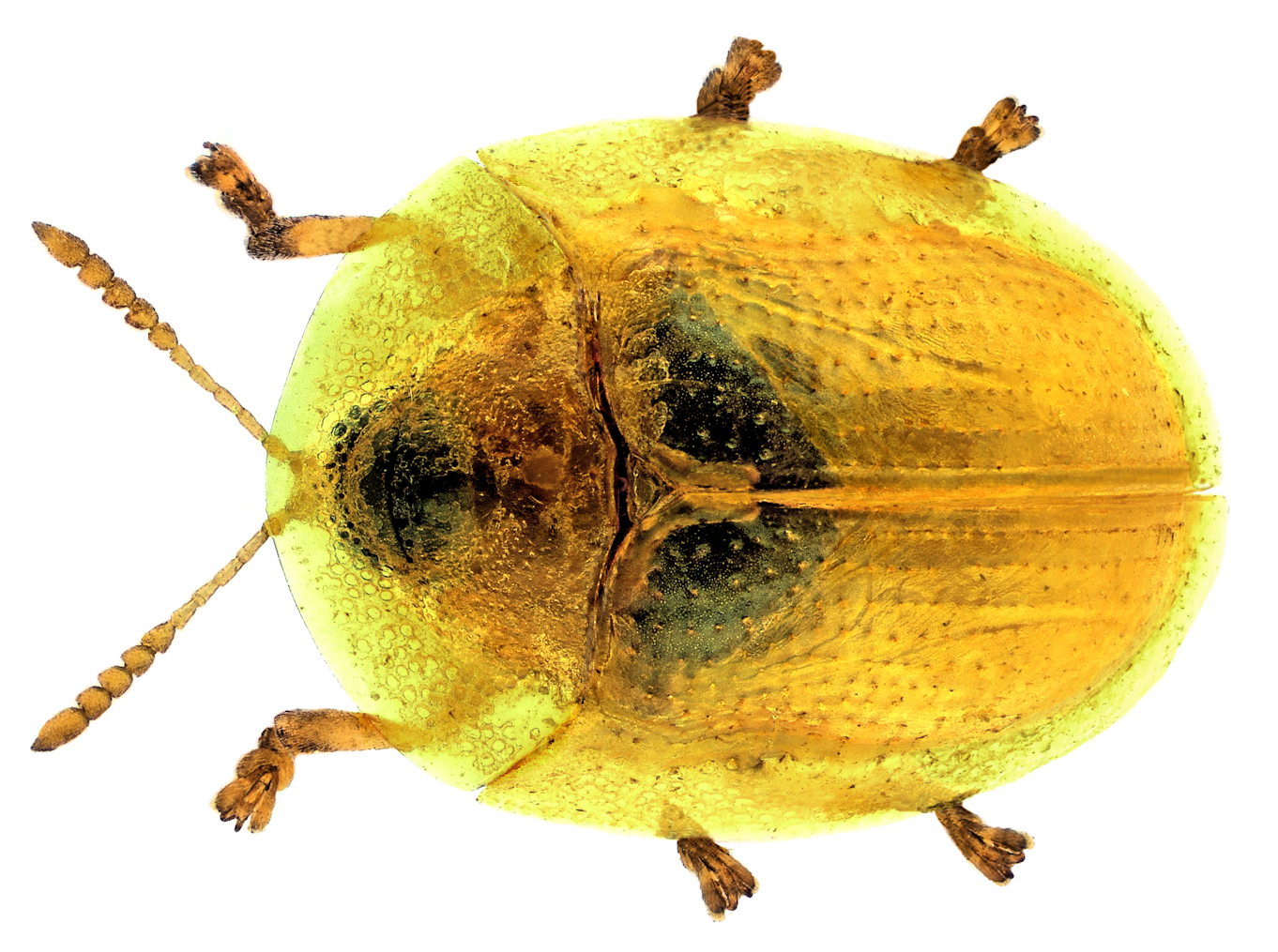

Scientific classification
- Kingdom: Animalia
- Phylum: Arthropoda
- Class: Insecta
- Order: Coleoptera
- Suborder: Polyphaga
- Infraorder: Cucujiformia
- Family: Chrysomelidae
- Genus: Cassida
- Species: C. margaritacea

Binomial name
- Cassida margaritacea Schaller, 1783

= Cassida margaritacea =

Species of beetle

Cassida margaritacea is a species of beetle belonging to the family Chrysomelidae.

It is native to Europe.
