= Cassida imbecilla =

Scientific classification
- Kingdom: Animalia
- Phylum: Arthropoda
- Class: Insecta
- Order: Coleoptera
- Suborder: Polyphaga
- Infraorder: Cucujiformia
- Family: Chrysomelidae
- Genus: Cassida
- Species: C. imbecilla

Binomial name
- Cassida imbecilla (Boheman, 1854)

Synonyms
- Coptocycla imbecilla Boheman, 1862; Cassida imbecilla Maulik, 1919; Metriona imbecilla Spaeth, 1914

Species of beetle

Cassida imbecilla, is a species of leaf beetle found in Sri Lanka.
