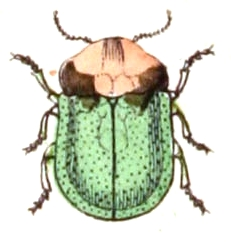

Scientific classification
- Kingdom: Animalia
- Phylum: Arthropoda
- Class: Insecta
- Order: Coleoptera
- Suborder: Polyphaga
- Infraorder: Cucujiformia
- Family: Chrysomelidae
- Genus: Cassida
- Species: C. panzeri

Binomial name
- Cassida panzeri Weise, 1907

Synonyms
- Cassida thoracica Panzer, 1796 (non C. thoracica Geoffroy, 1785); Cassida Panzeri Weise, 1907

= Cassida panzeri =

Species of beetle

Cassida panzeri is a species of beetle in the leaf beetle family, found in the Palearctic realm, and in the Honshu province of Japan. The host plants are in the family Asteraceae, and include Arctium lappa, Scorzonera humilis, Taraxacum officinale, Tragopogon pratensis and Cirsium species (including Cirsium arvense and Cirsium vulgare).
