= Cassida expansa =

Scientific classification
- Kingdom: Animalia
- Phylum: Arthropoda
- Class: Insecta
- Order: Coleoptera
- Suborder: Polyphaga
- Infraorder: Cucujiformia
- Family: Chrysomelidae
- Genus: Cassida
- Species: C. expansa

Binomial name
- Cassida expansa Gressitt, 1952

Synonyms
- Cassida smaragdocruciata Medvedev & Eroshkina, 1982

Species of beetle

Cassida expansa is a species of beetle of the family Chrysomelidae. It is found in Vietnam and China (Hainan).
