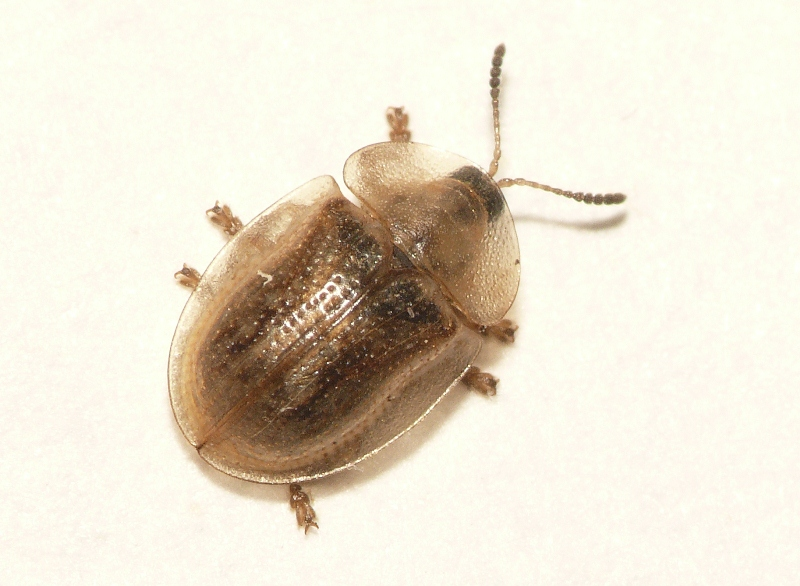

Scientific classification
- Kingdom: Animalia
- Phylum: Arthropoda
- Class: Insecta
- Order: Coleoptera
- Suborder: Polyphaga
- Infraorder: Cucujiformia
- Family: Chrysomelidae
- Genus: Cassida
- Species: C. flaveola

Binomial name
- Cassida flaveola Thunberg, 1794

Synonyms
- Cassida obsoleta Illiger, 1798; Cassida pallida Paykull, 1799; Cassida exsculpta Charpentier, 1825; Cassida kusnetzovi Matis, 1974

= Cassida flaveola =

Species of beetle

Cassida flaveola, also known as the pale tortoise beetle, is a brownish coloured beetle in the leaf beetle family.

== Distribution ==
The beetle is found in the Palearctic realm, east up to the Russian Far East.

== Ecology ==
The host plants are Caryophyllaceae species, including Cerastium vulgatum, Honckenya peploides, Malachium aquaticum, Spergula arvensis, Spergula nemorum, Stellaria graminea and Stellaria media.
