= Dipriocampe =

Scientific classification
- Domain: Eukaryota
- Kingdom: Animalia
- Phylum: Arthropoda
- Class: Insecta
- Order: Hymenoptera
- Family: Tetracampidae
- Subfamily: Tetracampinae
- Genus: Dipriocampe; Bouãek, 1957

Genus of insects

Dipriocampe is a genus of insects belonging to the family Tetracampidae.

The species of this genus are found in Europe.

Species:

- Dipriocampe bouceki Gumovsky & Perkovsky, 2005
- Dipriocampe diprioni (Ferriere, 1935)
- Dipriocampe elongata (Erdös, 1951)
