= Foersterella =

Scientific classification
- Kingdom: Animalia
- Phylum: Arthropoda
- Class: Insecta
- Order: Hymenoptera
- Family: Tetracampidae
- Subfamily: Tetracampinae
- Genus: Foersterella; Dalla Torre, 1897

Genus of insects

Foersterella is a genus of insects belonging to the family Tetracampidae.

The species of this genus are found in Europe.

Species:

- Foersterella angusticornis Hansson, 2016
- Foersterella anupama Narendran, 2000
