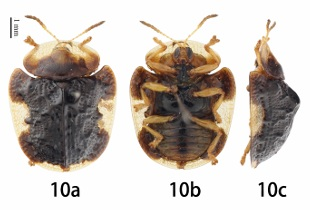

Scientific classification
- Kingdom: Animalia
- Phylum: Arthropoda
- Class: Insecta
- Order: Coleoptera
- Suborder: Polyphaga
- Infraorder: Cucujiformia
- Family: Chrysomelidae
- Genus: Cassida
- Species: C. vespertina

Binomial name
- Cassida vespertina Boheman, 1862

= Cassida vespertina =

Species of beetle

Cassida vespertina is a species of beetle in the family Chrysomelidae. This species is found in China (Beijing, Chongqing, Fujian, Gansu, Guangdong, Guangxi, Guizhou, Hebei, Heilongjiang, Hubei, Hunan, Inner Mongolia, Jiangsu, Jiangxi, Shaanxi, Sichuan, Zhejiang), Taiwan, Japan, Mongolia, North Korea and the Russian Far East.

Adults have an oval body. The pronotum is ochraceous brown and the elytral disc is dark brown.
