= Cassida saucia =

Scientific classification
- Kingdom: Animalia
- Phylum: Arthropoda
- Class: Insecta
- Order: Coleoptera
- Suborder: Polyphaga
- Infraorder: Cucujiformia
- Family: Chrysomelidae
- Genus: Cassida
- Species: C. saucia

Binomial name
- Cassida saucia Weise, 1889

Species of beetle

Cassida saucia is a species of beetle in the leaf beetle family, found in various Asian countries, including Armenia, Azerbaijan, Iran and Turkey. The species feeds on plants in the family Solanaceae, particularly Lycium europaeum.
