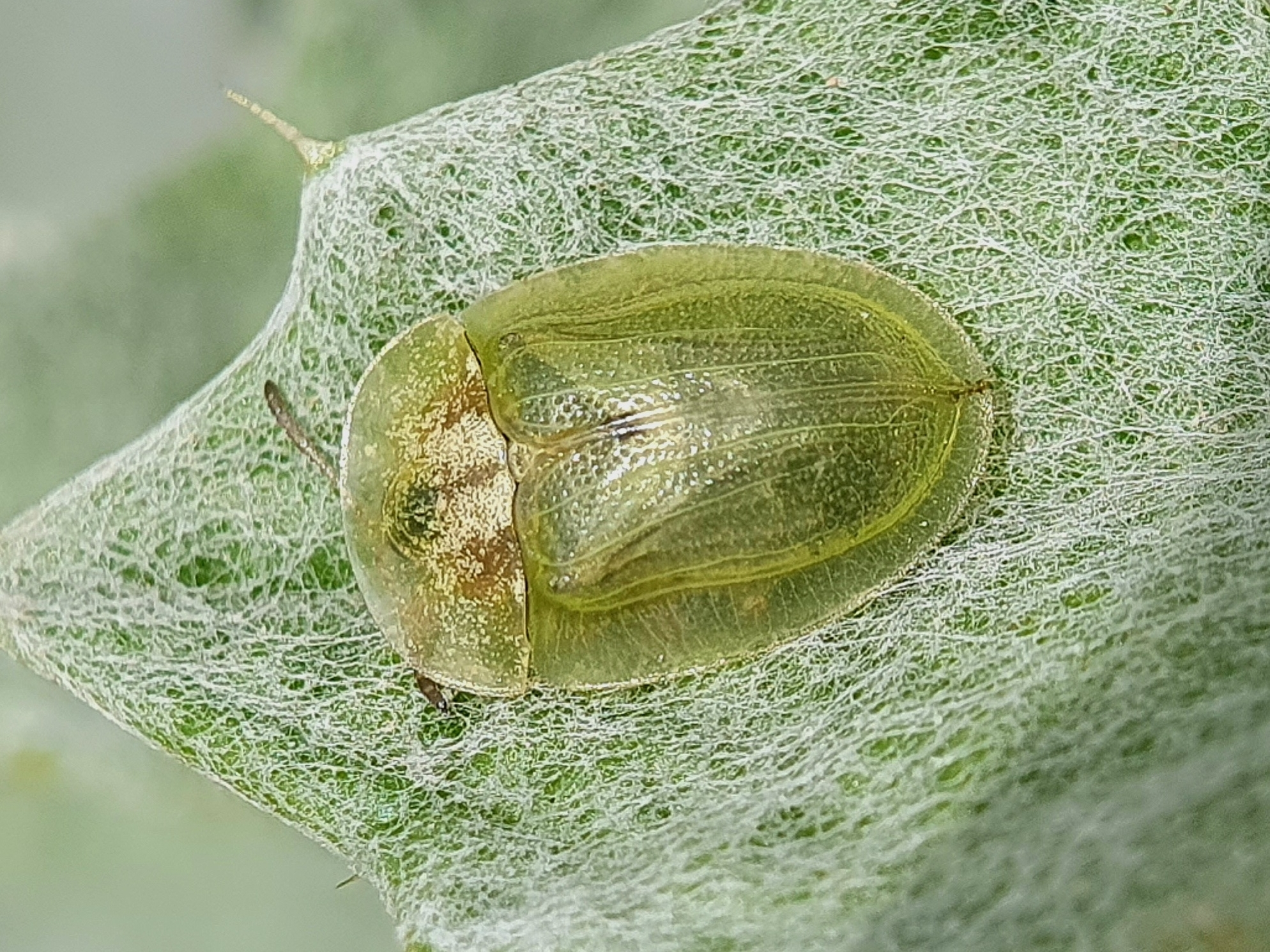

Scientific classification
- Kingdom: Animalia
- Phylum: Arthropoda
- Class: Insecta
- Order: Coleoptera
- Suborder: Polyphaga
- Infraorder: Cucujiformia
- Family: Chrysomelidae
- Genus: Cassida
- Species: C. deflorata

Binomial name
- Cassida deflorata Suffiran, 1844

Synonyms
- Cassida deflorata Suffrian, 1844; Cassida herbea Lucas, 1849; Cassida limbaticollis Fairmaire, 1856; Cassida gallica Megerle: Gemminger and Harold, 1876 (nomen nudum).; Cassida sardoa Heyden: Gemminger and Harold, 1876 (nomen nudum).; Cassida scolymi Küster: Gemminger and Harold, 1876 (nomen nudum).

= Cassida deflorata =

Species of beetle

Cassida deflorata is a greenish-coloured beetle in the leaf beetle family.

== Distribution ==
The beetle can be found in African countries, including Algeria and Morocco, as well as in European countries like France, Italy, Portugal and Spain.

== Habitat ==
The species feeds on plants in the family of Asteraceae, such as, Arctium lappa, Carduus tenuiflorus, Cirsium dyris, cardoon, artichoke, Jacobaea maritima and Silybum marianum.
