= Maria Bordy =

Soviet woman news photographer

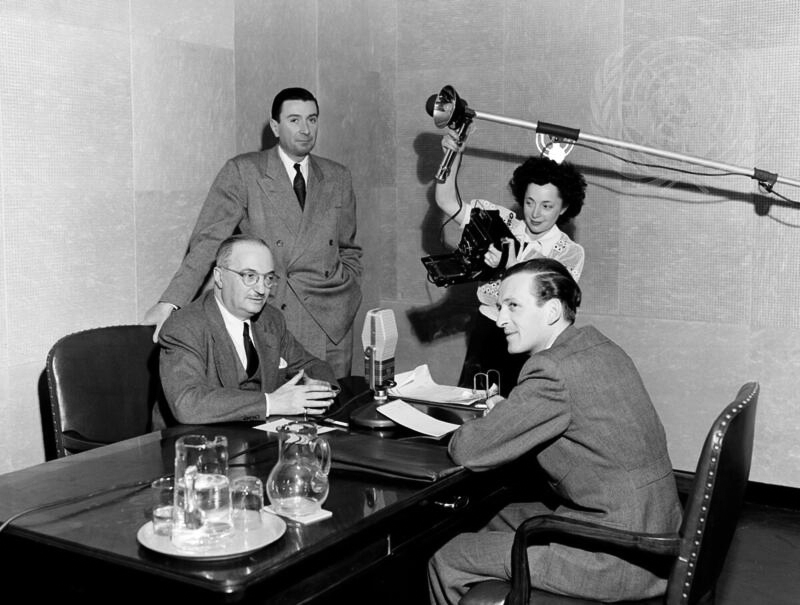
Maria Bordy, U.N. Official Photographer makes a picture of Jean Benoit-Levy (left), Director of the U.N. Films and Visual Information Division

Marla Bordy (Russian: Мария Борди) (15 August 1916–c.1966) was a Soviet news photographer and public relations officer for the United Nations.

== Life and training ==
Marla Bordy (née Tamarkina), also known as Maria Bock-Bordy and Maria Bordes, was born on 15 August 1916 in Toropets (Торопец), Pskov Governorate, Russia, 400 km west of Moscow, with two sisters Frieda and Tamara, and a brother, Hans. She graduated in linguistics from the Moscow College of Foreign Languages in Moscow.

== Career ==
Bordy moved to Vienna to further her study in languages. Gifted a 35mm camera she started to document the period leading up to the Anschluss lived and was hired as a news photographer in about 1934. She covered the German invasion of Paris before departing wartime Europe.

She then entered the USA from Havana, Cuba on the SS Mexico on 1 July 1941, and on 25 October that year married Austrian Fred J. Bock-Bordy in New York City, living there at 17 Chittenden Ave. He later became a US citizen but she did not. She studied at the School of Modem Photography (SMP), established in 1939 at 487 Park Avenue, New York.

=== United Nations photographer ===
Fluent in Russian, English, French, German and Spanish, she approached the United Nations for work before it opened and she was one of the first two, and later was among four, press photographers employed in New York. By 1960 she had worked for fifteen years in the Films and Visual Information Section of the United Nations Secretariat in its Department of Public Information (DPI), established in 1946. As appropriate to a given assignment, she used 35mm Nikons and Leicas, and a larger format 4"x 5" Speed Graphic press camera.

Her photographs were widely distributed, first to 35 UN information centres worldwide, and published in a variety of media in the form of press releases, posters and booklets, and as educational film strips (a mid-century multimedia format).

Bordy herself proved newsworthy. A Bombay Chronicle Weekly provides an account of her approach to photographing major political figures at the UN;

"Miss Maria Bordy of Russia, a U. N. photographer, described by the Agency as "pretty" [brought] Sir Zafrullah Khan and Mr. N. Gopalaswamy Ayyangar together by her smile. It appears that she made these two gladiators in the arena of United Nations pose together several times, and in one of the pictures, Mr. Ayyangar is reported to have put his arm round Zafrullah Khan and remarked: "Soon she will ask us to kiss." [ … ] this delightful young lady’s parting comment at the end of the performance...: "You see, if you have me around, YOU DO NOT NEED THE U. N. O."

She was mentioned also in a Bell Syndicate feature on women at the United Nations as a "tiny Russian photographer on Audrey Langston's staff, who speaks five languages and chalked up some kind of a record when she not only got 8 good picture of camera shy Soviet Delegate Andrei Gromyko, but also made him smile. Her ambition is studio of her own." She was also interviewed about her work and the UN on WKOK on 24 February 1949.

== Notable work ==
Her iconic picture of sunlight glancing from the dome of the General Assembly with the Secretariat towering behind, and a backdrop of sun and billowing clouds, was used repeatedly in publicity for the UN. When interviewed for Editor and Publisher in 1960 in which she is described as a "diminutive redhead", she recalled taking the photograph;

"...one July morning, walking around its familiar features, I came upon this picture. Symbols are deceptive and often mean different things to different people. But this one, I think, is otherwise. It is one of those rare pictures which do not need a caption and it satisfies you as a composition. The sphere and the rectangle are good solid shapes against the dramatic sky, a bit like piece of modern sculpture with the lucky accident of the sun giving it depth and light. I believe I have caught glimpse here of what many people want the United Nations to be; a solid building for peace firmly planted in our world in the sunshine."

A mural print of her photograph of the United Nation General Assembly appeared as the largest image in Edward Steichen’s world-touring The Family of Man exhibition. A copy is held in the Madison Digital Image Database (MDID) collection of James Madison University and 1141 images by her can be accessed in the United Nations News and Media archive.

== Suspected espionage ==
United States Central Intelligence Agency (CIA) documentation of 1966 shows Bordy was suspected of involvement in espionage through the 'Silvermaster' group, after she made an expense-free trip to the Soviet Union in 1946; for her frequent contact with the New York City USSR Consulate from 1944 to 1947; and association with Stepan N. Choundenko who was supervisor of Soviet agents Jack Soble and Harry Gold. Another CIA document of 1967 implicates her in the Saefkow group;

"Otto Katz ... involved in the abortive [Soviet] attempt to overthrow the Weimar republic [in 1921] ... was then associated with Willi Meunzenberg who was also an important agent of the Comintern. The wife of Otto Katz was Ilse Klagemann and she is known to have been associated with Fred Bock-Bordy in New York during WW II. Maria and Fred Bock-Bordy were suspected of being Soviet agents. In the 1941-42 period, Fred Bock-Bordy worked for Motty Eitingon, partner with Maria Bordy’s uncle George S. Gregory whose real name is Gregori Josefowitz."
