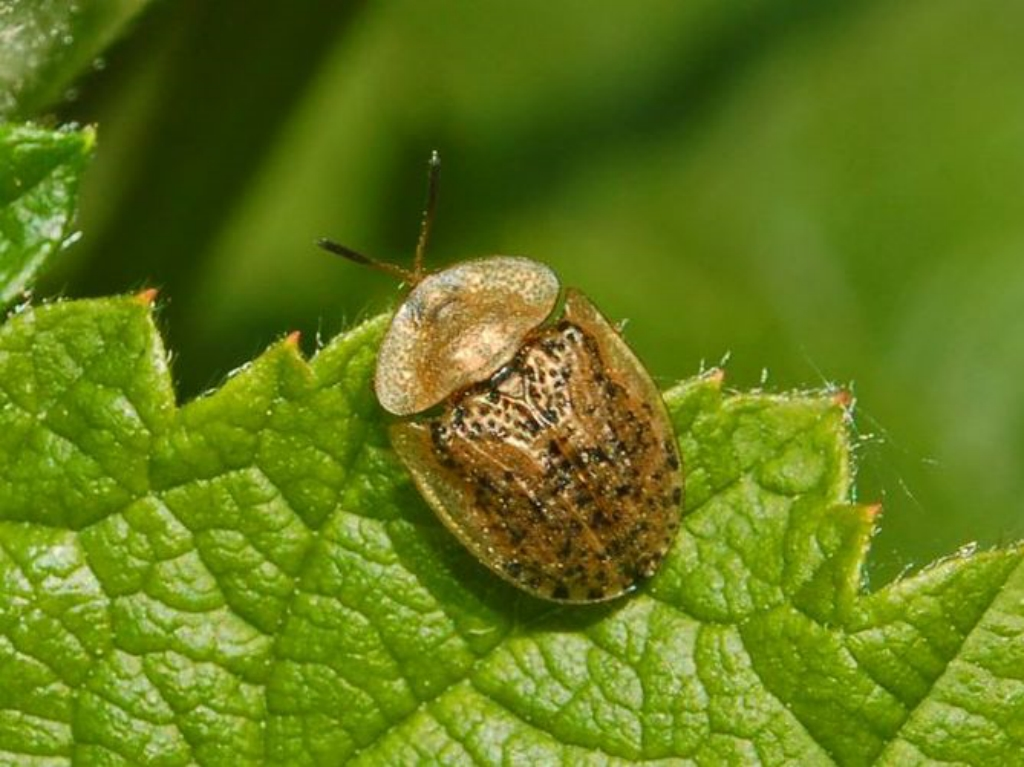
- Adult
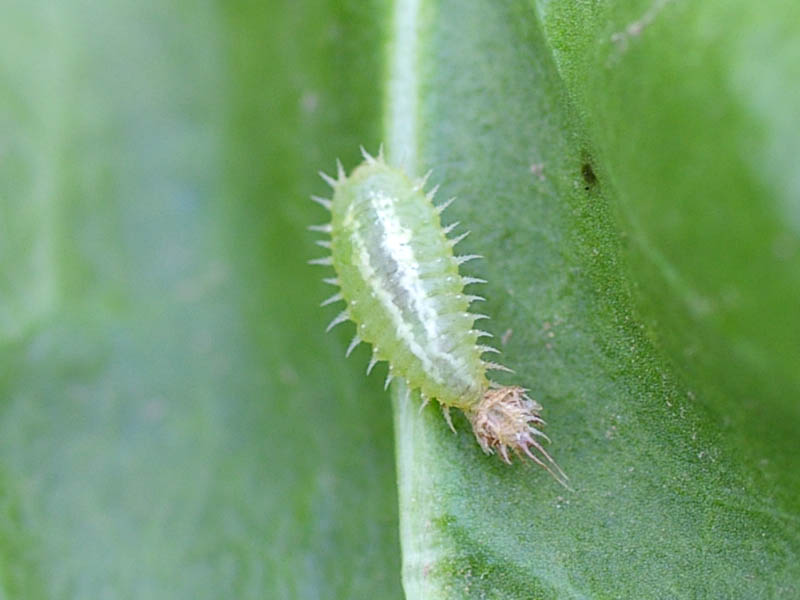
- Larva

Scientific classification
- Kingdom: Animalia
- Phylum: Arthropoda
- Clade: Pancrustacea
- Class: Insecta
- Order: Coleoptera
- Suborder: Polyphaga
- Infraorder: Cucujiformia
- Family: Chrysomelidae
- Genus: Cassida
- Species: C. nebulosa

Binomial name
- Cassida nebulosa Linnaeus, 1758

Synonyms
- Cassida affinis Fabricius, 1775; Cassida maculata Fabricius, 1775; Cassida tigrina De Geer, 1775

= Cassida nebulosa =

Species of beetle

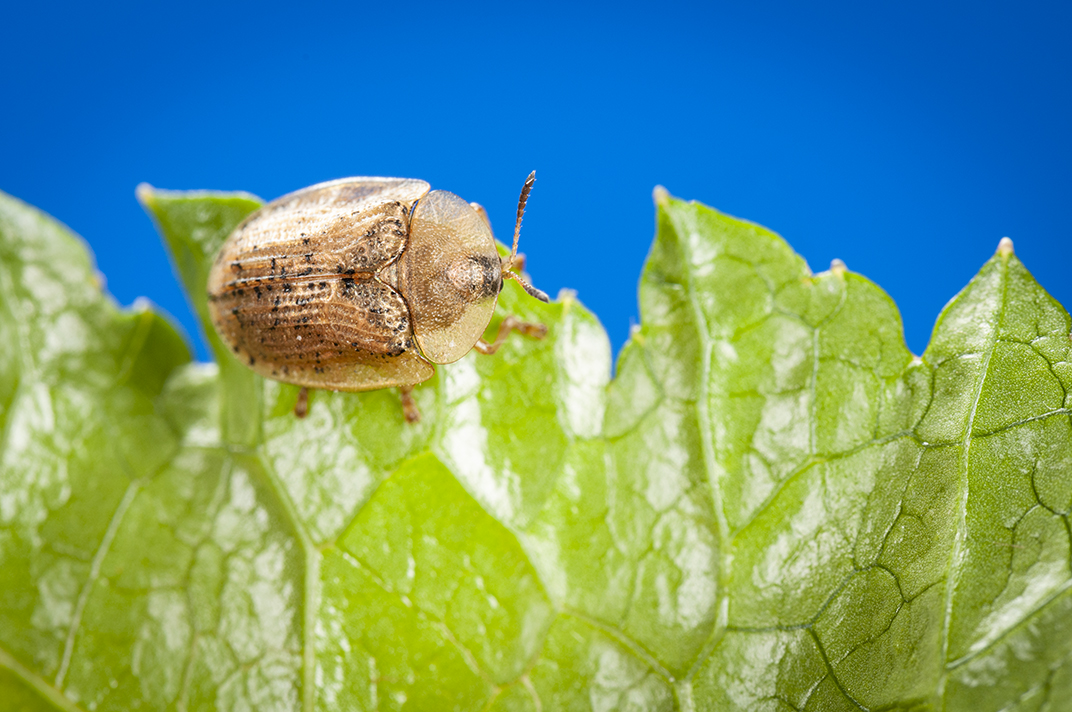
Adult, from South Korea

Cassida nebulosa is a tortoise beetle, a species of leaf beetle (family Chrysomelidae), belonging to the subfamily Cassidinae.

It feeds on several plants of the family Chenopodiaceae; particularly on beet Beta vulgaris, on Chenopodium album, on C. glaucum and on Atriplex hortensis.

It is widely distributed in most of Europe, Russia, East Asia including China, Korea and Japan.
