= Bordy =

Bordy is a surname. Notable people with the surname include:

- Bella Bordy (1909–1978), Hungarian ballet dancer and film actress
- Maria Bordy (1916–1966), Soviet news photographer and public relations officer
- William Bordy, American politician

== See also ==
- Brody
