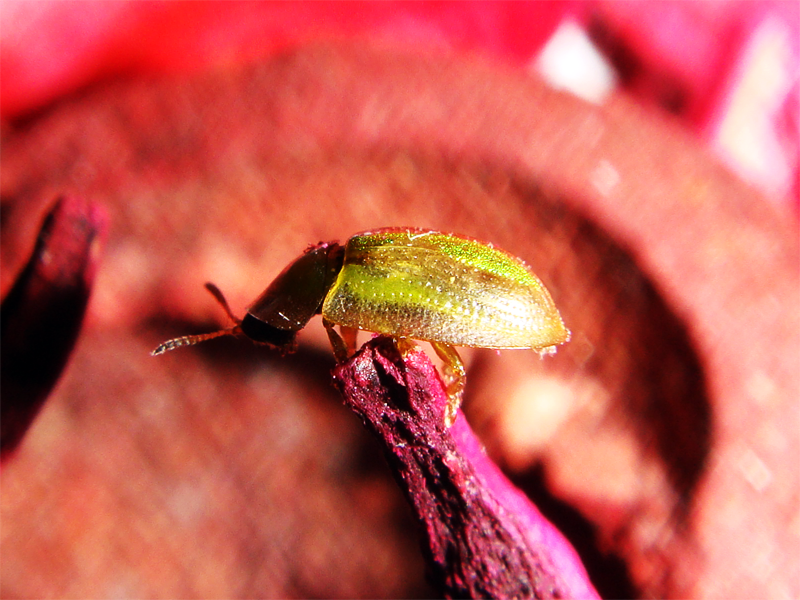

Scientific classification
- Kingdom: Animalia
- Phylum: Arthropoda
- Class: Insecta
- Order: Coleoptera
- Suborder: Polyphaga
- Infraorder: Cucujiformia
- Family: Chrysomelidae
- Genus: Cassida
- Species: C. vittata

Binomial name
- Cassida vittata Villers, 1789

Synonyms
- Cassiduella vittata

= Cassida vittata =

Species of beetle

Cassida vittata is a green-coloured beetle from the leaf beetle family, that can be found in Europe.
