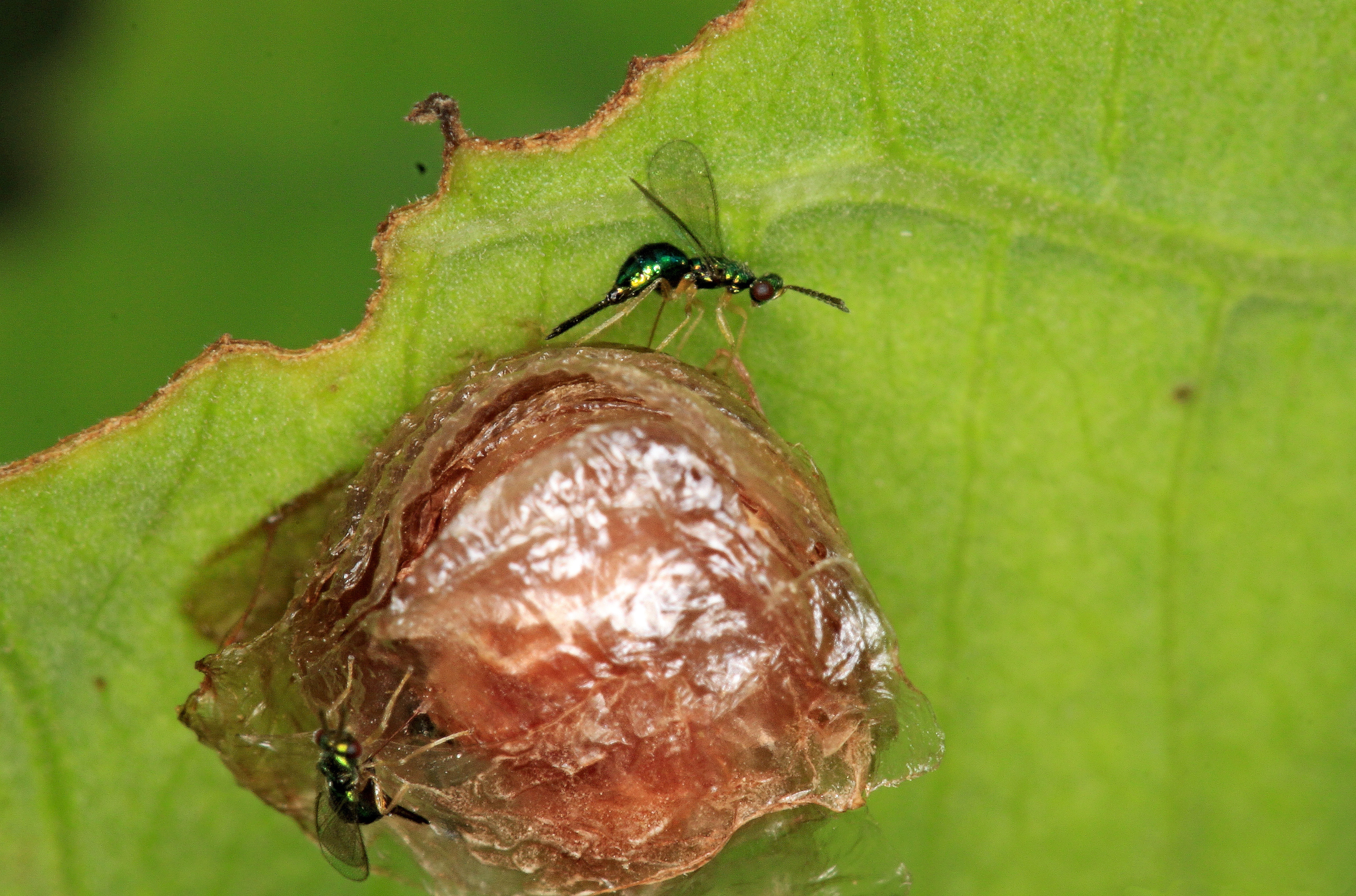
- Egg mass of Aspidimorpha sanctaecrucis parasitized by Tetracampidae wasps

Scientific classification
- Domain: Eukaryota
- Kingdom: Animalia
- Phylum: Arthropoda
- Class: Insecta
- Order: Hymenoptera
- Family: Tetracampidae; Förster, 1856

Subfamilies
- Distylopinae; Mongolocampinae; Platynocheilinae; Tetracampinae

Diversity
- 4 subfamilies 14 genera 44 species

= Tetracampidae =

Family of wasps

The Tetracampidae are a small family of parasitic wasps in the superfamily Chalcidoidea. They are parasitoids of phytophagous insects, primarily flies. The 44 species in 15 genera are almost entirely absent from the New World.

The biology of most species of Tetracampidae is little studied. Most of those whose hosts are known are associated with insects that mine in plants. European species of one genus, Dipriocampe, are endoparasitoids of the eggs of diprionid sawflies, and the British species of Foersterella are endoparasitoids of the eggs of Cassida spp. (Coleoptera, Cassididae). One species, Dipriocampe diprioni, was introduced into Canada from Europe for the biological control of diprionid pests, but did not become established.

In Africa and Madagascar, members of this family are egg parasitoids of beetles (Chrysomelidae) and sawflies (Diprionidae), or larval parasitoids of flies (Agromyzidae).

Numerous fossil taxa are in this group, but their relationships to other chalcidoid families remain obscure.
