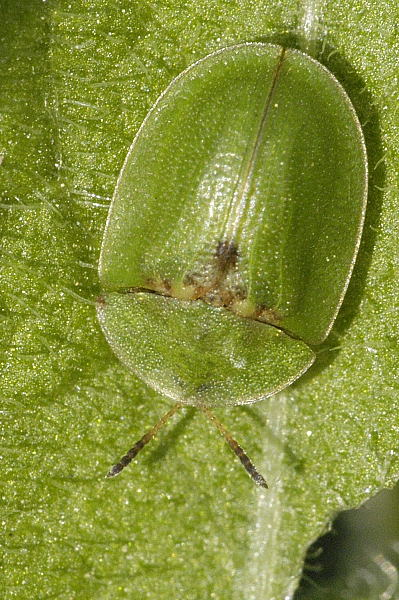

Scientific classification
- Kingdom: Animalia
- Phylum: Arthropoda
- Clade: Pancrustacea
- Class: Insecta
- Order: Coleoptera
- Suborder: Polyphaga
- Infraorder: Cucujiformia
- Family: Chrysomelidae
- Genus: Cassida
- Species: C. rubiginosa

Binomial name
- Cassida rubiginosa Müller, 1776

= Thistle tortoise beetle =

Species of beetle

The thistle tortoise beetle (Cassida rubiginosa) is a species of beetle in the subfamily Cassidinae (tortoise beetles) and the genus Cassida. The thistle tortoise beetle can be recognized by its green, rounded back and it can be found on thistle plants in many regions of North America and Europe. The thistle tortoise beetle was first discovered in 1902 in Lévis, Quebec. In 1931, Nellie F. Paterson was the first to document the mature larva. Later, the instar larva of this species was first recorded in 2004 by Jolanta Świętojańska. The thistle tortoise beetle exhibits multiple defense behaviors, such as a flexible shield, providing a barrier against the mandibles of predators, and an excretion that protects the eggs as well.

Its ability to massively consume and damage thistle plants has also made this beetle a well known biological control agent in many countries, including the United States, Canada, and Switzerland. However, in some cases, the impact of these beetles has been limited due to parasitism preventing their accumulation in regions of thistle targeted for biological control.

== Description ==
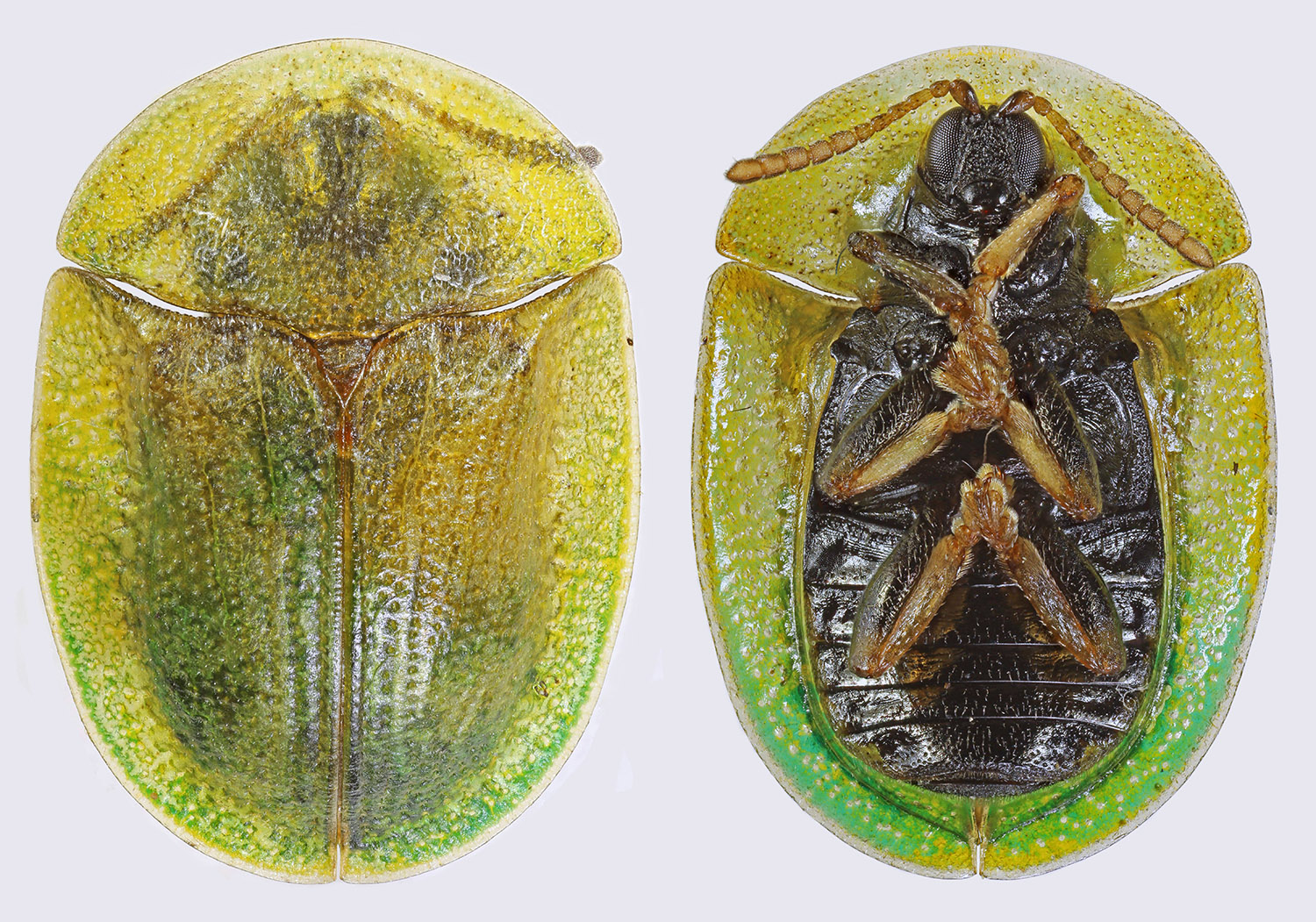
Dorsal and ventral views of C. rubiginosa

The thistle tortioise beetles measure 6.0–8.0 mm in length. Like all Cassida, its head is covered by the pronotum, and the elytra has a wide flange surrounding it. This species is highly rounded, with green or yellowish-green elytra, sometimes with a small, dark triangular spot around the scutellum. The common name may be misleading for the identification of this species as rubiginosus, which is Latin for "rusty or rust-coloured". However, in preserved conditions, the green color quickly becomes brown.

== Taxonomy ==
The thistle tortoise beetle belongs to the Cassidinae subfamily, which is part of the Chrysomelidae family in the order Coleoptera. Cassidinae makes up around 16% of the Chrysomelidae species and represents the second largest sub-clade within the Chrysomelidae family. Cassidinae was first seen during the late Jurassic period, and they have evolved into approximately 6,000 species that can be arranged into 43 tribes. Cassidinae species commonly serve as biological control agents for overgrown plants.

== Distribution and habitat ==
This beetle inhabits North America and can be commonly found from South Dakota to Virginia within the United States. In Canada, it is found across several provinces, spanning from Alberta to New Brunswick. In Europe, it can be encountered from Fennoscandia to Greece and Spain. It is also found in Great Britain and across Siberia.

In these regions, they live in areas where there are plenty of thistle. For example, these can include fields, pastures, orchards, meadows, and farmland. The types of thistles they reside on include the Canada thistle, the bull thistle, the musk thistle, the plumeless thistle, and the field thistle.

== Ecology ==
=== Diet ===
C. rubiginosa feeds on various Asteraceae, including thistles and many others.

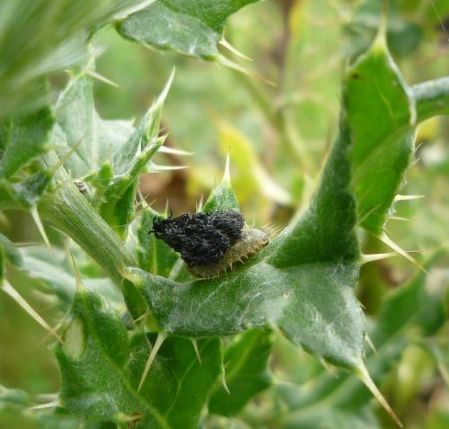
Thistle beetle larva carrying dried frass on its back on a creeping thistle.

Thistle beetle larvae mainly stay on the leaves they were hatched on throughout their development and feed on them. The adults are usually found on the underside of the leaves and the larvae on the uppersides. The time it takes for them to begin feeding depends on a few factors relating to the leaf's structure. The larvae wait until the thistle plants grow by 30% and for the nitrogen levels in the leaves to drop by 50% before feeding. The time that they start feeding also affects the growth of the thistle plant. The plant's upward-growing capability is inhibited when feeding starts late in the season. However, no effect on the plants is detected when feeding begins in the early season. '

Adult feeding can damage the leaves more significantly than larvae feeding since they do not begin eating from the edges of the leaf but instead begin at the center and eat down from the surface.

Adults may also feed on pollen of buttercups and ox-eye daisies.

The beetle's consumption of these plants is facilitated by a symbiotic relationship with the bacteria Stammera, which is housed in specialized structures within the foregut and allows the beetle to digest pectin, which is indigestible to most animals.

=== Predators ===
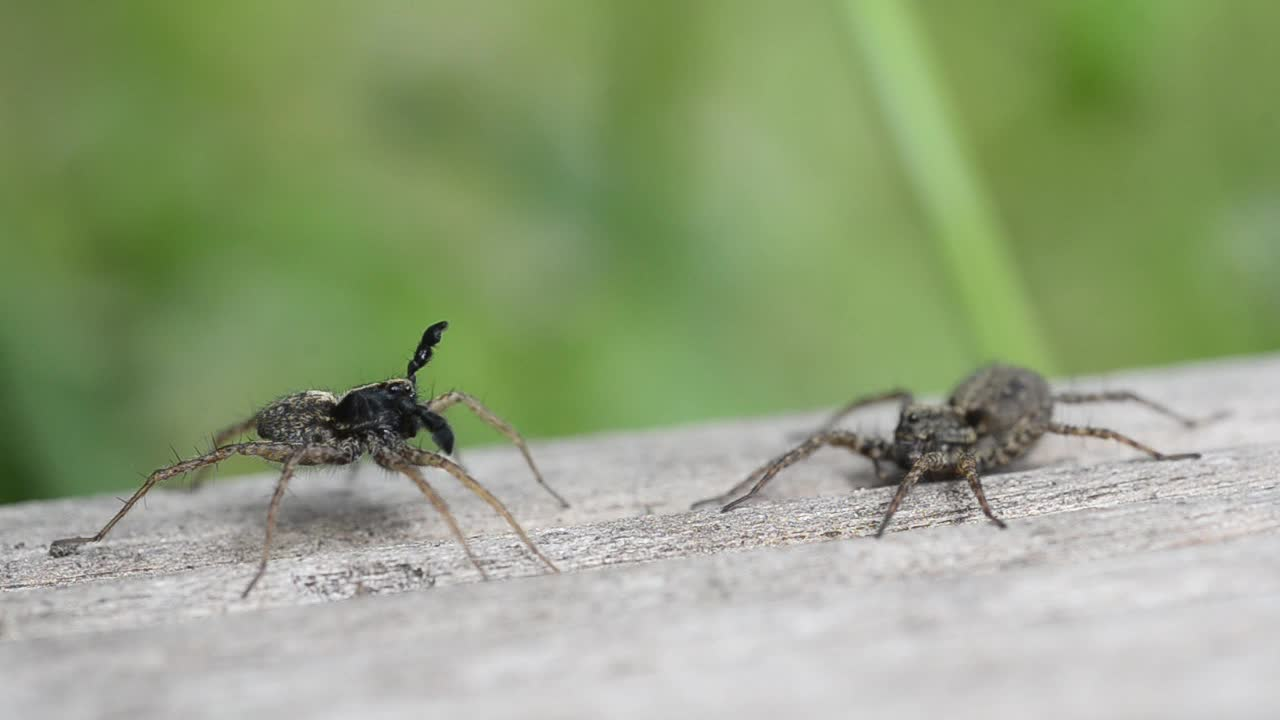
Two lycosid spiders

Larvae predators include ants and lycosid spiders. Oftentimes, the egg excreta after being laid that engulfs the eggs are able to protect them from predators that target them. Later in development, the larvae's shield can protect them from ant attacks, but not from larger predators like lycosid spiders. Other predators include the coccinellid beetles. Similar to ant attacks, coccinellid beetles with their short mandibles had trouble attacking thistle tortoise beetles. However, the thistle tortoise can't protect themselves against those with longer mandibles. In the Switzerland population of thistle tortoise beetles, the main predator of larvae is Polistes dominulus. These paper wasps were the dominant cause of thistle beetle mortality and were found to be responsible for 99.4% of predation on these beetles in that country.

As the larvae develop, they develop a shield with its feces to protect itself from danger. This protection mechanism is possible because of lateral spines, which can form a shield. It was found that this shield has the capability to protect different areas of the body by moving to areas that sense danger. In 1967, Thomas Eisner showed that thistle beetles without their shield were vulnerable to ants, which were able to attack them and bring them to their nests. When they had their shield, the ants no longer attacked them and quickly moved on. The larvae also had different protection mechanisms because their shields could protect them from all predators. When predators had longer mandibles, it was found that these shields became less effective. For example, it did not matter when the shield was present or not when facing a lycosid spider. Another defense mechanism they have for stronger predators is that, when sensing danger, they begin moving erratically, which scares predators away.

=== Parasites ===
Parasites have a large impact on the survival rates of thistle beetles. In different regions of the world, different parasites affect these beetles. In the South Virginia population of thistle beetles, it was predicted that parasitism was a top two reason for mortality. One of the most common parasites that accounts for almost a quarter of total thistle beetle parasitism is Tetrastichus rhosaces. In certain cases, a larva or pupa would have up to 10 of these parasites at one time near the anal region. These parasites were difficult to detect and would usually be only seen during the last larval stage. For those that have parasites, the larvae had an abnormal color.

Another prominent parasite that affects these beetles is Eucelatoria dimmocki. They are a type of fly found in Virginia and Maryland. In some regions such as Maryland, these parasites accounted for almost 20% of total parasitism. They target larvae and pupae. In Europe, the most prominent parasite of thistle beetle larvae and pupae that accounts for 96% of total parasitism are Hexamermis species

== Behavior ==
=== Parental care ===
Adult thistle beetles are univoltine. In March and April, females began laying their eggs. Oviposition depends on many conditions, ranging from rain and wind to temperature and the length of the day. Another factor females consider is the amount of food available and its quality because the females and their eggs will feed on the same plant. It was found that females often lay their eggs near their feeding sites. This phenomenon could be explained by females sampling areas of leaves and choosing the most optimal place to lay their eggs to ensure that they will also have an abundance of high-quality food. Females usually lay their eggs on the bottom of the leaf, which occurs at higher frequencies than the topside of the leaf and the stem.

Soon after the eggs are laid, a layer of excreta is secreted that encloses them. Furthermore, after egg enclosure, the entire ootheca is also enclosed with excreta. This provides thistle beetle eggs with a double layer of protection. This is thought to protect the eggs by serving as a physical barrier against the environment and enemies and also acting as concealment. It was found that this enclosure increased egg survival rates as it protected them from predators and parasites. Due to the covering, these enemies had difficulty penetrating the barrier to get access to the egg.

=== Migration ===
During the fall, it has been observed that these beetles migrate to the forest floor from thistles. Once they reach the forest floor, they find spaces under leaf litter to hibernate. Those who have trouble accessing these locations had reduced survival rates. They remain in these shelters until early spring.

=== Reproduction ===
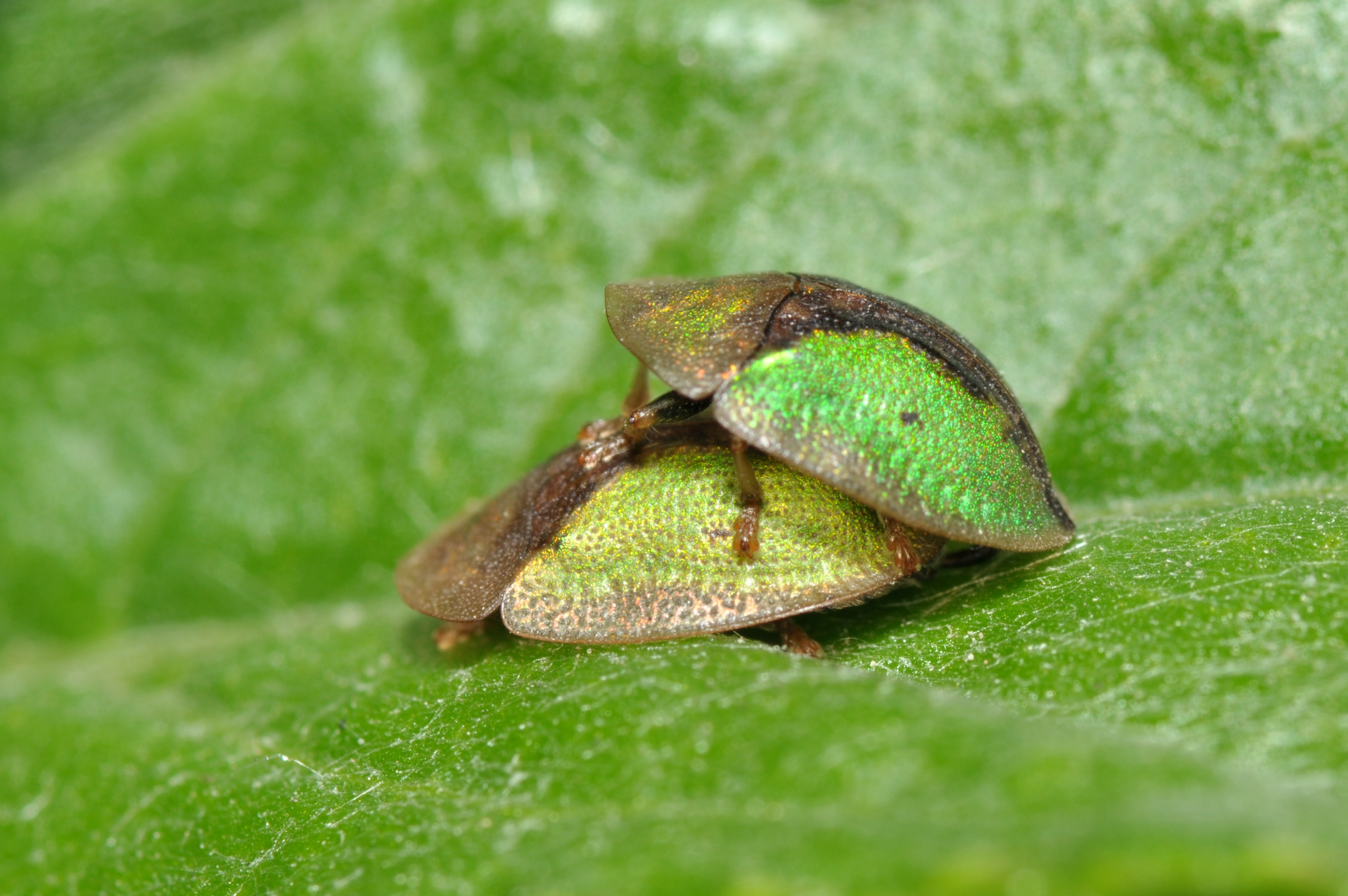
Thistle beetles mating

The intromittent organ of male thistle leaf beetles is a long, tube-like structure that is called the flagellum. The end of the flagellum is very thin and curved. As in many small beetles, this organ can become longer than its body. When not in use, the flagellum is stored inside the abdomen of the male. The muscles parallel to the lumen of the ejaculatory duct contract and push it out. The beetle needs such an organ because of the shape of the female reproductive organ, which includes a coiled duct that the male must penetrate with the contraction of ejaculatory muscles. These physical properties of the thistle beetle have been studied because the ability of a thin, flexible structure to penetrate without buckling or rupturing is mechanically challenging and may have important implications for the development of microscopic catheters in modern medicine.

== Life cycle ==
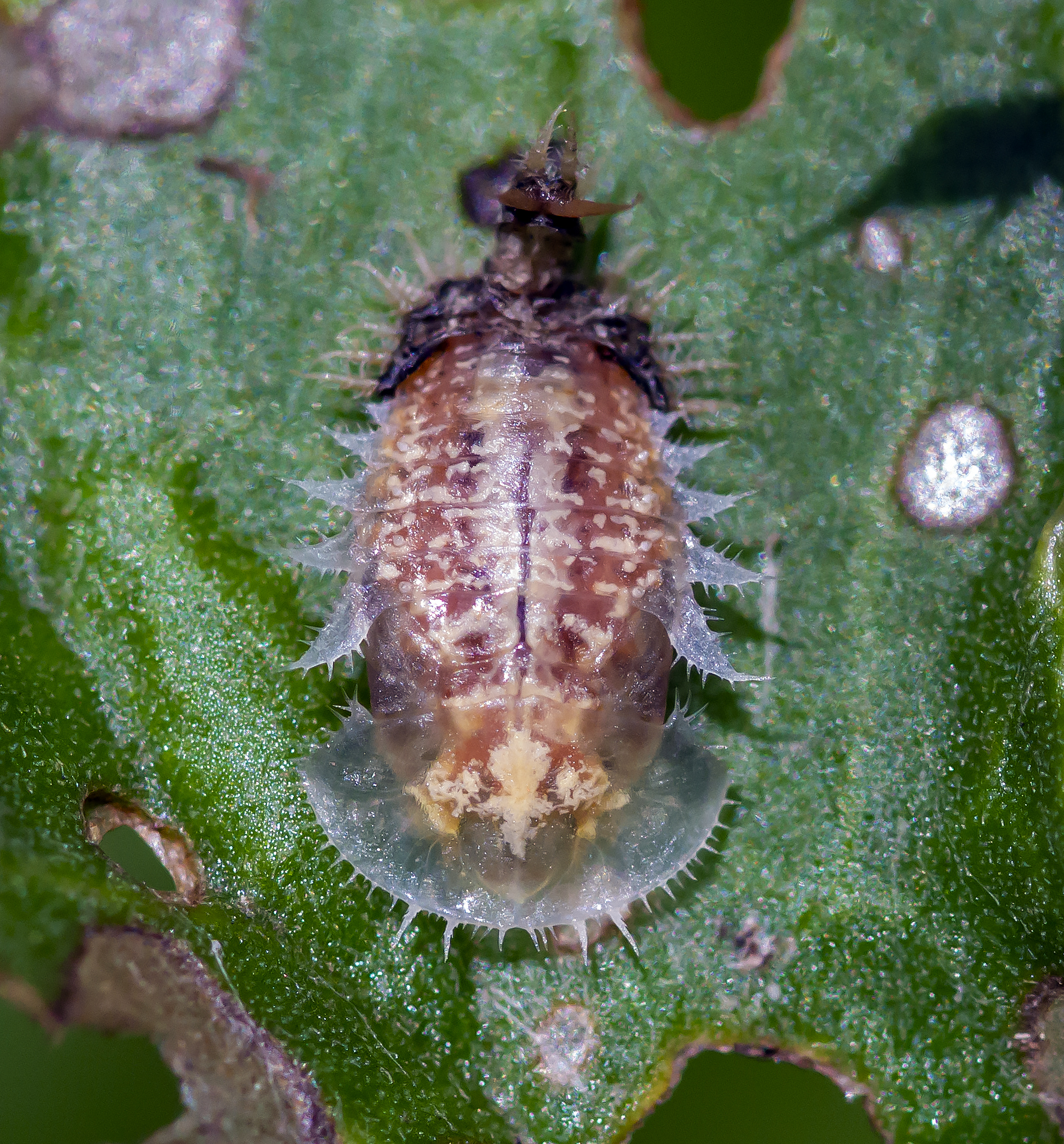
Thistle tortoise beetle nymph

The oviposition period lasts on average 12 weeks. Most times, they lay around 3 eggs per ootheca. However, this can increase up to 4-6 in different regions. The time it takes for eggs to hatch depends on the temperature. At lower temperatures, such as 18°C, eggs can take up to two weeks to hatch. Higher temperatures, such as 32°C, can facilitate the hatching of eggs in as little as four days.

There are five stages of larval development called instars. As with hatching rate, larvae development is temperature-dependent and shows a positive relationship with increasing temperature. It was also found that larvae develop faster during shorter days compared to longer days. Additionally, male larvae usually develop faster than female larvae.

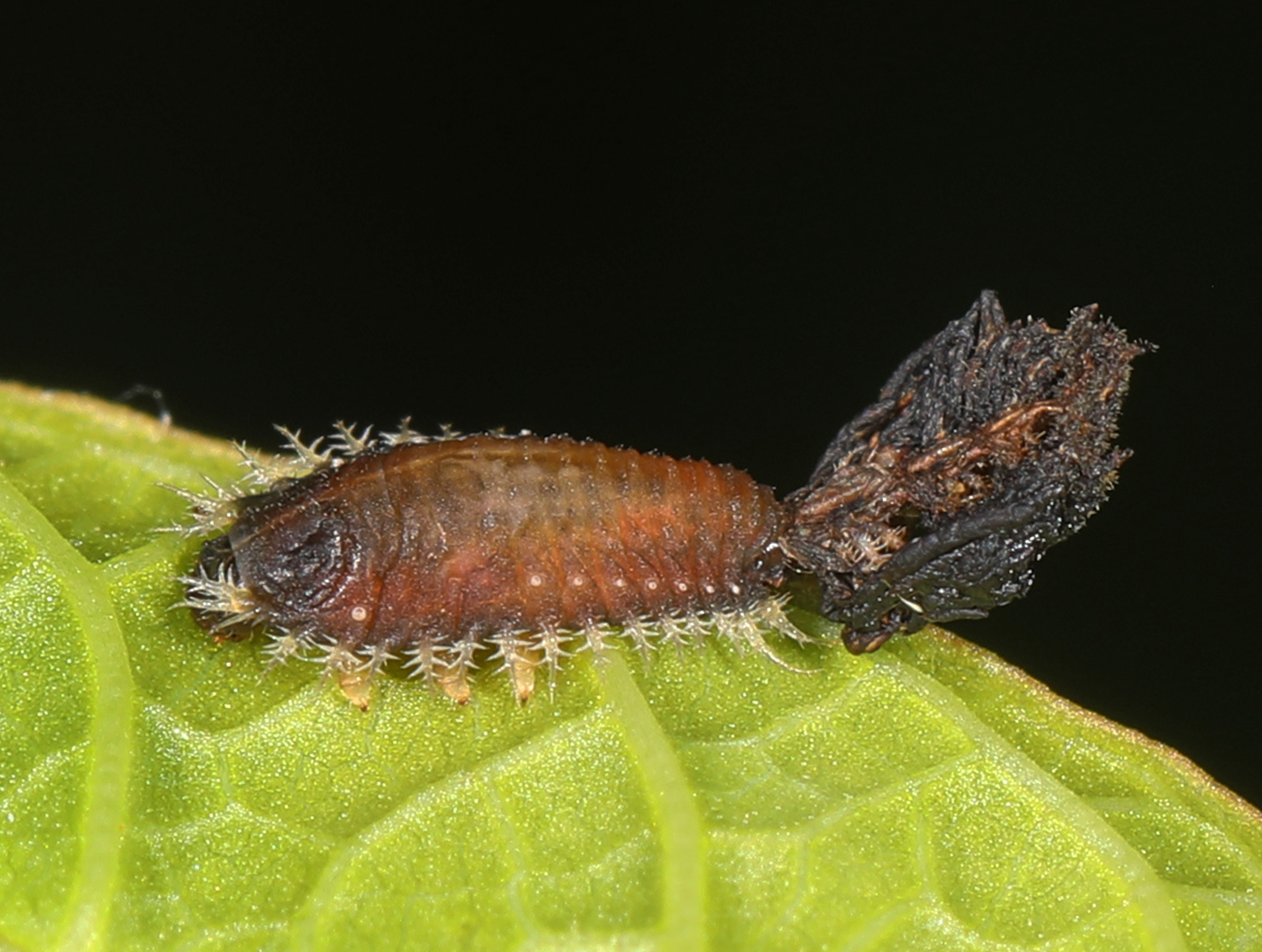
Thistle beetle with its shield

Larvae remain on thistle leaves that were laid only throughout their development. Once ready, they move to the central portion of the leaf, which is thicker, for pupation. Pupation length depends on the temperature, and it was shown that it ranges from around 3 days to 10 days depending on the temperature. Higher temperatures nearing 32°C led to a shorter pupation period. Between July and August, adults begin to appear.

== As biological control ==
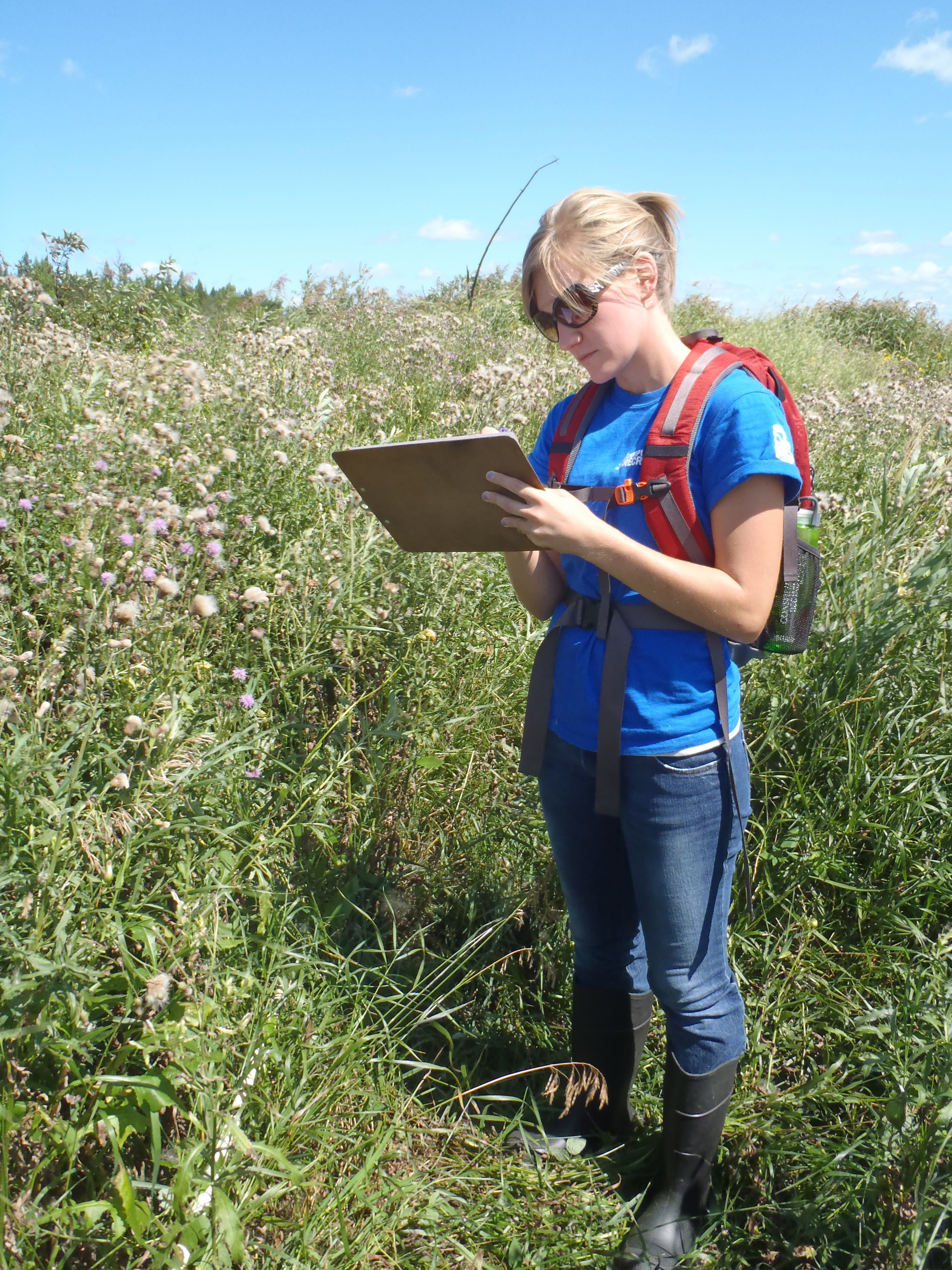
An FWS Wilderness Fellow tracking thistle beetles released in Canada as biological control agents

Thistle plants are known for their very fast-growing ability, which can quickly overpower local agriculture. They have few predators and are hard to kill through human activity due to their fast seed production. It is estimated that Canada thistle costs landowners around $32 million per year in Otago and Southland alone. Due to the beetle's ability to skeletonize leaves, they can damage several thistle types such as the plumeless thistles and nodding thistle. Because of this ability, these beetles were used as biological control agents against thistle weeds in many parts of the world.

Cassida rubiginosa was introduced to New Zealand for use as a biological control agent against Cirsium arvense (Canada thistle) in 2006. The beetle has subsequently been traded around New Zealand as a control agent. For example, in 2016, beetles collected from Ngaruawahia were released in Duder Regional Park in exchange for a group of the adult beetle Neolema ogloblin, which is a biological control agent for Tradescantia fluminensis.

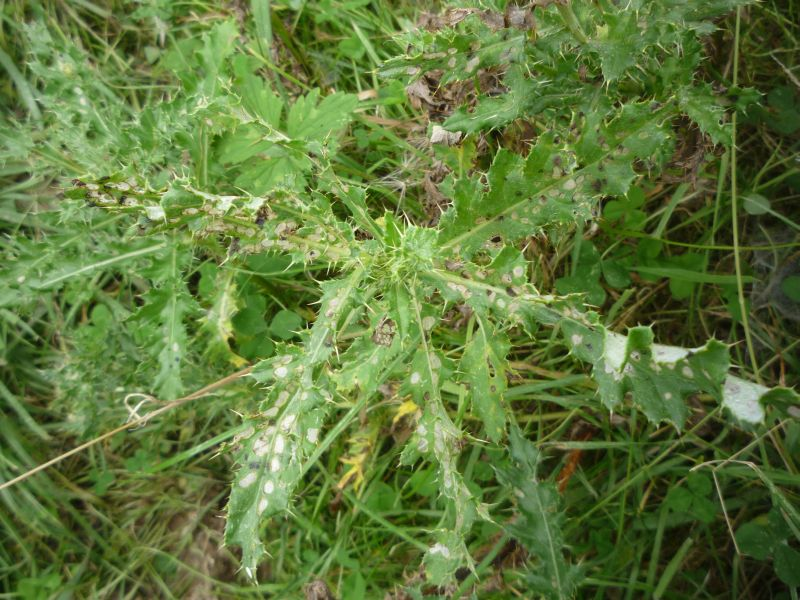
Damage to a thistle plant after thistle beetle feeding

Some states in the United States where thistle beetles are used as biological control agents are Virginia and Maryland. Significant results were seen in Maryland where musk thistle seed production was reduced by 72%. Flowering was inhibited after introducing thistle beetles to populations of thistle plants. In Virginia, it was found that thistle growth was affected the most when more than 50% of leaf foliage was consumed. In dry years in Virginia, five parasite-free beetles per plant have been shown to reduce above ground thistle biomass by 88%, with only 25% of these plants surviving to the end of the following year. In wet years the impact was less but still substantial.

Thistle beetles as a biological control were also widely used in Canada. In the province of Saskatchewan, thistle beetles were able to defoliate thistles in the region. In other regions of Canada, such as in the province of Quebec, it was found that these beetles were not sufficient in helping reduce thistle populations. One possible explanation for this was that parasitism was a challenge due to parasites preventing large populations of thistle beetles from thriving. It was found that parasites that inhibited the accumulation of thistle beetles when used as biological control agents were Tetrastichus rhosaces, Eucelatoriopsis dimmocki, Spilochalcis albifrons, Eupelmella vescicularis, and Itoplectis conquisitor.
