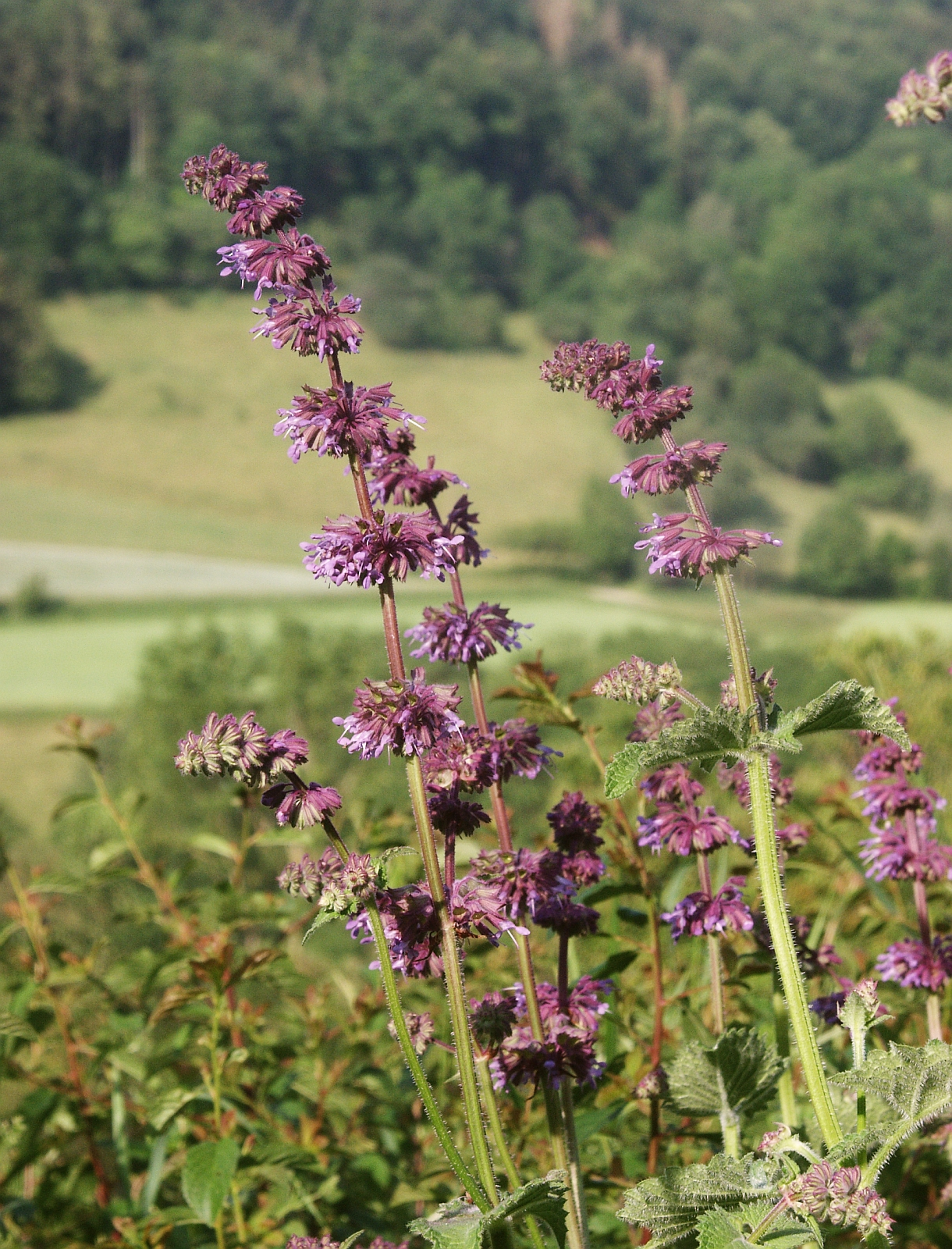

Scientific classification
- Kingdom: Plantae
- Clade: Tracheophytes
- Clade: Angiosperms
- Clade: Eudicots
- Clade: Asterids
- Order: Lamiales
- Family: Lamiaceae
- Genus: Salvia
- Species: S. verticillata

Binomial name
- Salvia verticillata L.

= Salvia verticillata =

Species of flowering plant

Salvia verticillata, the lilac sage or whorled clary, is a herbaceous perennial native to a wide area ranging from central Europe to western Asia, and naturalized in northern Europe and North America. It was first described by Carl Linnaeus in 1753.

Salvia verticillata has a leafy base of mid-green leaves covered with hairs, putting up leaf-covered stems that carry 3 feet (0.91 m) inflorescences. The tiny lavender flowers grow tightly packed in whorls, with tiny lime-green and purple calyces. The specific epithet verticillata refers to the whorls that grow in verticils. A cultivar introduced in the 1990s, 'Purple Rain', is much more showy and long-blooming, growing about 2 feet (0.61 m) tall.
