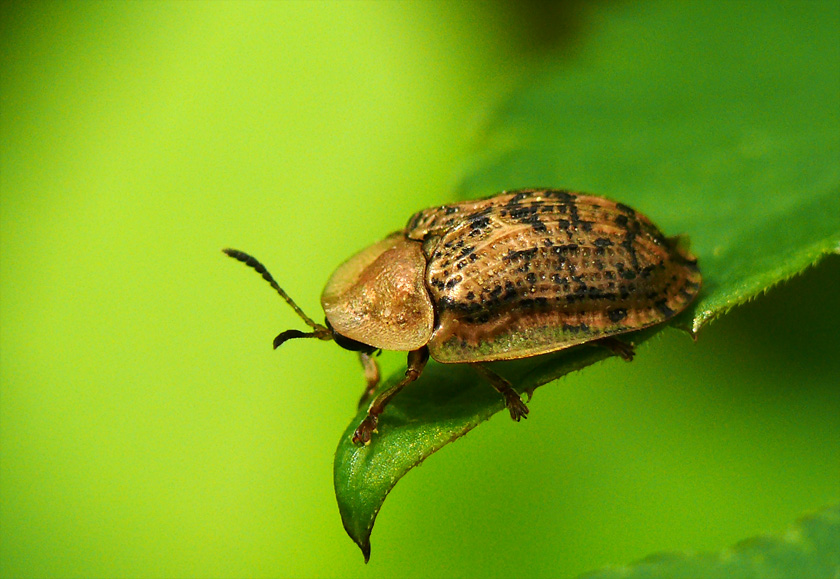
- C. nebulosa

Scientific classification
- Kingdom: Animalia
- Phylum: Arthropoda
- Clade: Pancrustacea
- Class: Insecta
- Order: Coleoptera
- Suborder: Polyphaga
- Infraorder: Cucujiformia
- Family: Chrysomelidae
- Subfamily: Cassidinae
- Tribe: Cassidini
- Genus: Cassida; Linnaeus, 1758

Type species
- Cassida nebulosa Linnaeus, 1758

Diversity
- at least 430 species

= Cassida =

Genus of beetles

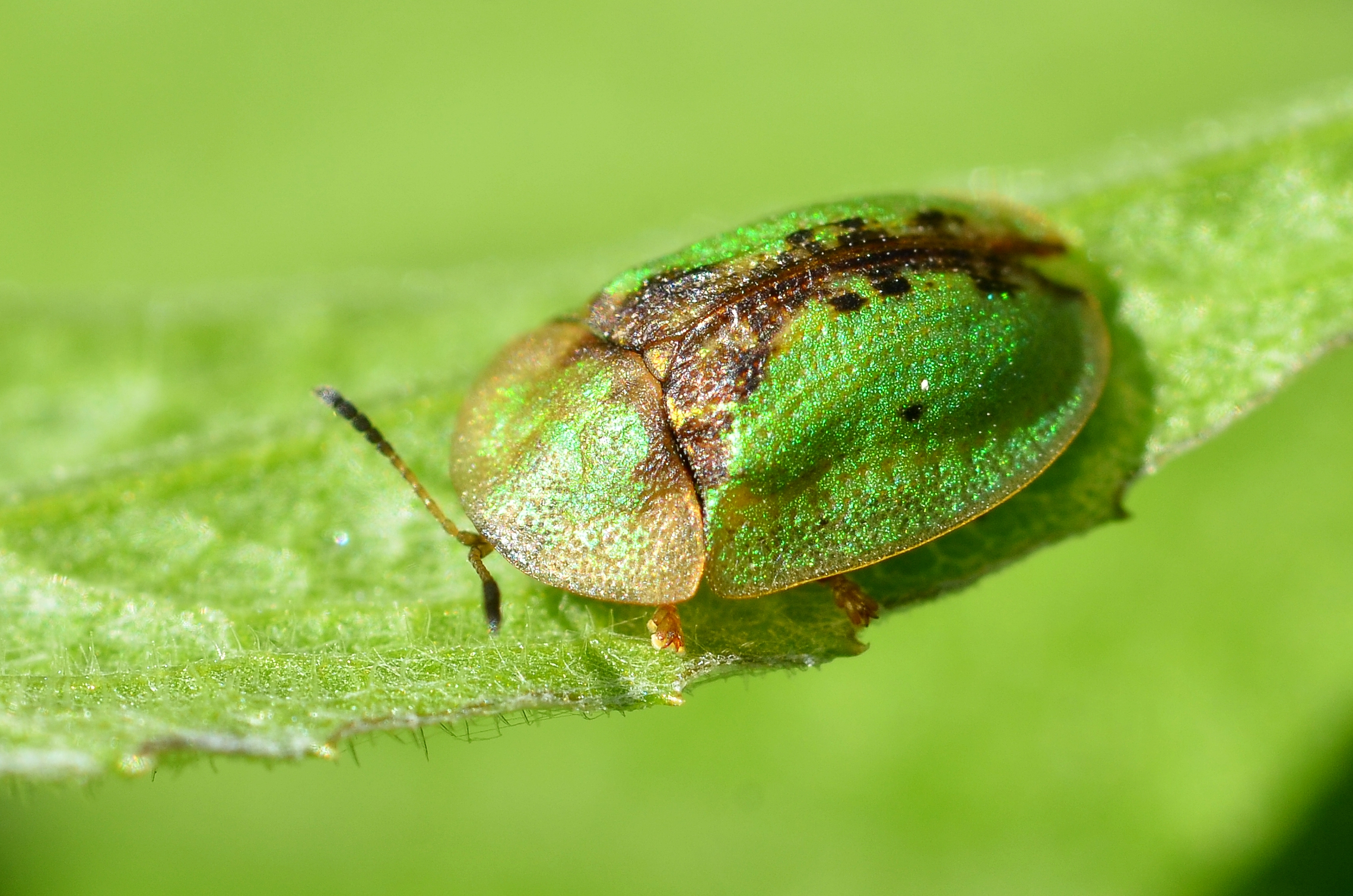
Cassida vibex

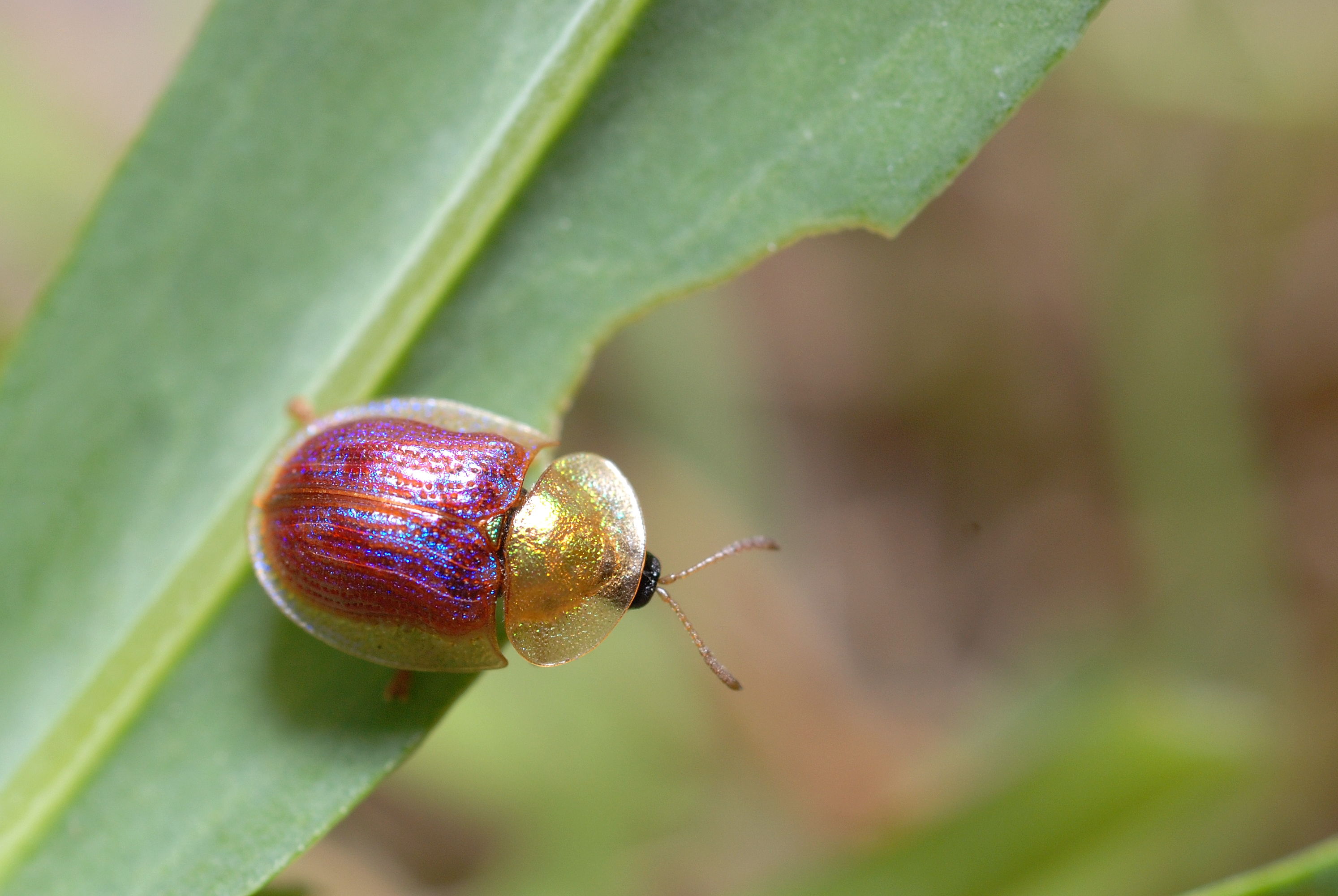
Cassida azurea

Cassida is a large Old World genus of tortoise beetles in the subfamily Cassidinae. The natural history of Cassida sphaerula in South Africa is a typical life cycle. Several species of Cassida are important agricultural pests, in particular C. vittata and C. nebulosa on sugar beet and spinach. The thistle tortoise beetle (Cassida rubiginosa) has been used as a biological control agent against Canada thistle.

The genus name is derived from Latin Cassis for a metal helmet.

There are at least 430 described species in Cassida. This genus contains the most species of all Cassidinae. Larvae build shields with their feces and exuviae, a widespread pattern of tortoise beetles.

== See also ==
- List of Cassida species
