= Just Highs No Lows (12 Years of Persistence) =

Compilation album by Brainstorm
- Released: 9 November 2009
- Genre: Heavy metal, power metal
- Length: 2:33:08
- Label: Metal Blade

Brainstorm chronology
Memorial Roots (2009)	Just Highs No Lows (12 Years of Persistence) (2009)	On the Spur of the Moment (2011)

Just Highs No Lows (12 Years of Persistence) is a compilation album by German heavy metal band Brainstorm, released on 9 November 2009. It consists of tracks from all their albums released via Metal Blade, from Ambiguity (2000) to Downburst (2008), including bonus tracks and covers, along with two live renditions of tracks from their first two albums; Hungry (1997) and Unholy (1998).

== Track listing ==
Disc 1

1. "Falling Spiral Down" - 4:40
2. "Fire Walk with Me" - 4:24
3. "End in Sorrow" - 4:47
4. "How Do You Feel" - 3:47
5. "Worlds Are Coming Through" - 4:55
6. "All Those Words" - 4:10
7. "Inside the Monster" - 4:55
8. "Painside" - 5:42
9. "Heavenly" - 5:33
10. "Highs Without Lows" - 5:28
11. "The Leading" - 5:38
12. "Doorway to Survive" - 3:22
13. "Shiva's Tears" - 5:33
14. "Fornever" - 4:55
15. "Soul Temptation" - 7:48

Disc 2

1. "Blind Suffering" - 4:24
2. "Hollow Hideaway" - 4:24
3. "Shadowland" - 3:47
4. "Under Lights" - 6:05
5. "Tear Down the Walls" - 3:55
6. "Maharaja Palace" - 5:27
7. "Beyond My Destiny" - 8:41
8. "Demonsion" - 6:36
9. "Face Down" - 5:42
10. "Breathe" - 4:15
11. "Drowning" - 4:28
12. "Crawling in Chains" - 3:47
13. "Before the Dawn" (Judas Priest cover) - 3:22
14. "Amarillo" (Tony Christie cover) - 3:17
15. "Voices" (live) - 3:19
16. "Liar's Edge" (live) - 6:02

== Personnel ==
- Andy B. Franck - lead and backing vocals
- Torsten Ihlenfeld - guitars, backing vocals
- Milan Loncaric - guitars, backing vocals
- Andreas Mailänder - bass
- Dieter Bernert - drums
