= Soul Temptation =

Studio album by Brainstorm
- Released: 30 June 2003
- Recorded: House of Music Studios, Winterbach, Storm Your Brain Studios, Gerstetten, Gate Studios, Wolfsburg, Germany, March–April 2003
- Genre: Power metal
- Length: 58:08
- Label: Metal Blade
- Producer: Achim Köhler & Brainstorm

Brainstorm chronology
Metus Mortis (2001)	Soul Temptation (2003)	Liquid Monster (2005)

Professional ratings
Review scores
Source	Rating
Allmusic	4/5 stars
Metal.de	8/10 stars
Powermetal.de	
Rock Hard	8.5/10 stars

Soul Temptation is the fifth album by the German power metal band Brainstorm, released in 2003. The album was also published in a double digipack limited edition, which features the bonus track "Amarillo" and a bonus DVD called Live Suffering, recorded live at the Summer Breeze Open Air Festival of 2002.

== Track listing ==
All songs written & arranged by Brainstorm, all lyrics by Andy B. Franck.

1. "Highs Without Lows" – 5:28
2. "Doorway to Survive" – 3:22
3. "The Leading" – 5:39
4. "Nunca Nos Rendimos" – 5:41
5. "Fading" – 5:31
6. "Shiva's Tears" – 5:32
7. "Fornever" – 4:55
8. "Soul Temptation" – 7:48
9. "Dying Outside" – 4:08
10. "To the Head" – 4:37
11. "Rising" – 5:08
- Tracks 6–8 form the "Trinity of Lust" trilogy.

== Personnel ==
Band members

- Andy B. Franck - lead and backing vocals
- Torsten Ihlenfeld - guitars, backing vocals, engineer
- Milan Loncaric - guitars and backing vocals, engineer
- Andreas Mailänder - bass
- Dieter Bernert - drums

Additional musicians

- Michael 'Miro' Rodenberg - keyboards, engineer

Production

- Achim Köhler - producer, engineer, mixing, mastering
- Ingmar Schelzel - engineer
