= Metus Mortis =

Studio album by Brainstorm
- Released: 24 October 2001
- Recorded: House of Music Studios, Winterbach, Storm Your Brain Studios, Gerstetten, Gate Studios, Wolfsburg, Germany, May–July 2001
- Genre: Power metal
- Length: 60:13
- Label: Metal Blade
- Producer: Achim Köhler & Brainstorm

Brainstorm chronology
Ambiguity (2000)	Metus Mortis (2001)	Soul Temptation (2003)

Professional ratings
Review scores
Source	Rating
Allmusic	2.5/5 stars
Metal.de	8/10 stars
Powermetal.de	8.5/10 stars
Rock Hard	9/10 stars

Metus Mortis is the fourth album by the German power metal band Brainstorm, released in 2001.

== Track listing ==
All songs written & arranged by Brainstorm, all lyrics by Andy B. Franck, except where indicated

1. "Metus Mortis" – 1:06
2. "Blind Suffering" – 4:24
3. "Shadowland" – 3:51
4. "Checkmate in Red" – 4:29
5. "Hollow Hideaway" – 4:25
6. "Weakness Sows Its Seed" – 5:45
7. "Into the Never" – 4:23
8. "Under Lights" – 6:05
9. "Cycles" – 4:17
10. "Behind" – 4:26
11. "Meet Me In The Dark" – 3:11
12. "Strength of Will" – 3:43
13. "Face Down" - 4:15 - (12. track on digipack version, Japanese bonus version)
14. "(E.O.C.) Cross God’s Face" - (Japanese bonus version)
15. "Savage" (Helloween cover) - (Japanese bonus version)

On the digipack version there is an untitled hidden track after "Strength of Will". That song is a Vicious Rumors cover: "Don't Wait For Me".

== Personnel ==
Band members

- Andy B. Franck - lead and backing vocals
- Torsten Ihlenfeld - guitars, backing vocals, engineer
- Milan Loncaric - guitars
- Andreas Mailänder - bass
- Dieter Bernert - drums

Additional musicians

- Michael 'Miro' Rodenberg - keyboards, engineer

Production

- Achim Köhler - producer, engineer, mixing, mastering
- Elmo - narrator, meth cook for band
