= SindoPower =

SindoPower GmbH
- Company type: GmbH
- Founded: 2009
- Defunct: 2015
- Headquarters: Nuremberg, Germany
- Products: Semiconductor
- Parent: SEMIKRON
- Website: www.sindopower.com

SindoPower was a German business-to-business (B2B) eCommerce company

SindoPower's parent company, The German-based holding company Semikron, employs 3,600 people worldwide. SEMIKRON comprises a global network of 35 companies with 10 production sites. Power electronics are produced in Germany, France, Italy, Slovakia, South Africa, Brazil, USA, China, India and South Korea. The company has a 37% share of the worldwide market for diode/thyristor modules.

SindoPower was integrated into the Semikron Group in 2015.

== Products ==
SindoPower’s product range consisted of approximately 2,000 of overall 11,600 different power semiconductors from 1 kW to 10 MW, including chips, discrete diodes/thyristors, fuses, sensors, varistors, connectors, and power modules (IGBT, MOSFET, diode, thyristor) as an official distributor of Epcos, LEM, Mersen, SEMIKRON and Weidmüller.

== eCommerce ==
In a market dominated by traditional sales channels, SindoPower's eCommerce model featured atypical for power semiconductor B2B's:

- public transparency in pricing
- Web 2.0 community approach for power electronics experts
- real-time customer service
- stock visibility and automatic substitute proposal for out of stock components

== Customer care ==
In May 2012 Epcos, LEM, Mersen, Proton-Electrotex, Semikron, SindoPower and Weidmüller started the joined platform PowerGuru to centralize power electronics know-how at one place.

== Literature ==
- Ulrich Nicolai; Tobias Reimann; Jürgen Petzoldt; Josef Lutz (1998), Applikationshandbuch IGBT- und MOSFET-Leistungsmodule (PDF-Version) (in German) (1. ed.), ISLE Verlag, ISBN 978-3-932633-24-9
- Arendt Wintrich; Ulrich Nicolai; Werner Tursky; Tobias Reimann (2010), Applikationshandbuch 2010 (PDF-Version) (in German) (2. ed.), ISLE Verlag, ISBN 978-3-938843-56-7
- Arendt Wintrich; Ulrich Nicolai; Werner Tursky; Tobias Reimann (2011), Application Manual 2011 (PDF-Version) (in German) (2. ed.), ISLE Verlag, ISBN 978-3-938843-66-6
