= Inverterization =

Speed adjuster for electric motors

Inverterization is the process of using an inverter-based motor drive intended to operate an electric motor at a variable speed for the sake of improved efficiency. The main job of the inverter is to control the speed and torque of the motor to match work requirements.

== Principle ==
A fixed speed drive can run in two states: on or off. The energy consumption of such a system is higher because it runs at full power even when that is not needed. Fixed speed drives are designed to manage starting at full speed, which does not maximize efficiency. An inverter represents one of the basic components of a variable speed drive (VSD) that includes other components such as a rectifier, an intermediate circuit and a control unit.

The basic work of an inverter within a VSD is simple. A microcontroller integrated with the inverter manages the speed of a motor according to demands. For example, in a refrigerator data such as temperature, humidity and motor speed are gathered through sensors to keep the motor running efficiently. Based on such data, a microcontroller optimizes performance. Motor speed is optimized and keeps the refrigerator's temperature constant.

== Applications ==
Inverterization has multiple applications in home appliances and industrial drives. Most major home appliances, including refrigerators, washing machines, fans, vacuum cleaners and pumps, are inverterized.

== Advantages ==
Inverterization offers advantages in multiple domains:

- Higher durability through smoothly starting engines improves efficiency through an increase in power factor, and improves process control.
- Reducing motor speed saves energy. For example, slowing down a fan motor from 100% to 80% when less airflow is needed can save as much as 50% ofn energy use.
- Inverterization reduces noise and vibration.

Inverterization has become popular due to the low cost volume production of Intelligent Power Modules (IPMs) and the availability of easy-to-use designs. It is popular to use in electrical appliances such as fans and air conditioning systems, due to energy savings. In Japan, for instance, inverterization of washing machines reached 100% in 2011.
