= On the Spur of the Moment =

On the Spur of the Moment may refer to:

- On the Spur of the Moment (Horace Parlan album), 1961
- On the Spur of the Moment (Brainstorm album), 2011
