= DCB =

DCB may stand for:

- Dame Commander of the Order of the Bath
- Development Credit Bank, a private-sector bank in India
- David Campbell Bannerman (born 1960), a British politician
- David Crowder Band, a Christian rock band
- Dictionary of Canadian Biography
- Dulwich College Beijing, a British international school in Beijing, China

== In science and technology ==
- Disconnecting circuit breaker, a high-voltage circuit breaker with disconnectors integrated into the breaking chamber
- Data center bridging, in computer networking
- Data Control Block, a data structure for accessing data sets on IBM mainframes
- Double Cantilever Beam, a test specimen in fracture mechanics
- Dichlorobenzene
- Digital Control Bus, a proprietary MIDI-like interface by Roland Corporation
- Direct Copper Bonding, also Direct Bonding Copper, a type of power electronic substrate
- Direct Carrier Billing, a method of doing digital financial transactions
- Dithionite-Citrate-Bicarbonate method used for iron oxide removal from clays in soil science
