= Rogers Corporation =

American engineered materials company

- Type: Public
- Traded as: NYSE: ROG; S&P 600 component
- Industry: Advanced specialty materials
- Founded: 1832; 194 years ago
- Headquarters: Chandler, Arizona, United States
- Key people: Ali El-Haj, President and CEO
- Products: Advanced electronics solutions, Elastomeric material solutions
- Revenue: US $810.8 Million (2025)
- Website: www.rogerscorp.com

Rogers Corporation is a specialty engineered materials company headquartered in Chandler, Arizona.

== History ==
In 1832, the company was founded by Peter Rogers as Rogers Paper Manufacturing Company. Today, the company is composed of two business segments: Advanced Electronics Solutions and Elastomeric Material Solutions. The company was listed on the New York Stock Exchange in April, 2000.

In 2004, Rogers started Rogers Technologies Suzhou Company Ltd, a wholly owned subsidiary, located in Suzhou, China. Rogers opened its first Suzhou facility in 2002, adding manufacturing capability for their roller and high-frequency laminate products. A second manufacturing facility opened in 2003.

In 2011, Rogers purchased German based curamik® Electronics, a manufacturer of power electronic substrates.

In 2016, Rogers announced that it would move its headquarters from the village of Rogers in Killingly, Connecticut, to Chandler, Arizona.

In November 2021, DuPont announced that it intended to acquire Rogers in a deal valued at $5.2 billion. The deal has been approved by all the necessary regulators save for the People's Republic of China's State Administration for Market Regulation. Due to the long delay that Chinese authorities presented, DuPont terminated the acquisition of Rogers and agreed to pay a termination fee of $162.5 million USD.

As of 2023, Rogers has locations the United States, China, Germany, Hungary, Belgium, Korea, Japan, Singapore, Taiwan, and the United Kingdom.

== Products and technology ==
Rogers’ Advanced Electronics Solutions business provides advanced material solutions to enable signal integrity, radio frequency (RF) signal management, power efficiency, electric power distribution and thermal management. This business unit offers products including high frequency laminates, bondplys, pre-pregs, cooling solutions, ceramic substrates, and busbars.

Rogers’s Elastomeric Material Solutions business provides high performance engineered materials, including PORON® polyurethane foams, BISCO® performance silicones, ARLON® custom silicones, DeWAL™ PTFE and UHMW films and tapes and XRD® extreme impact mitigation materials.

Rogers offers liquid cooling materials designed to dissipate large amounts of heat, and provide thermal management of high-power laser diodes and other heat-generating optical devices. The cooling structures are copper foil channels bonded into a tight block, with aluminium nitride (AlN) isolation layers added for extra performance.

Rogers manufactures PORON® brand industrial microcellular polyurethane.

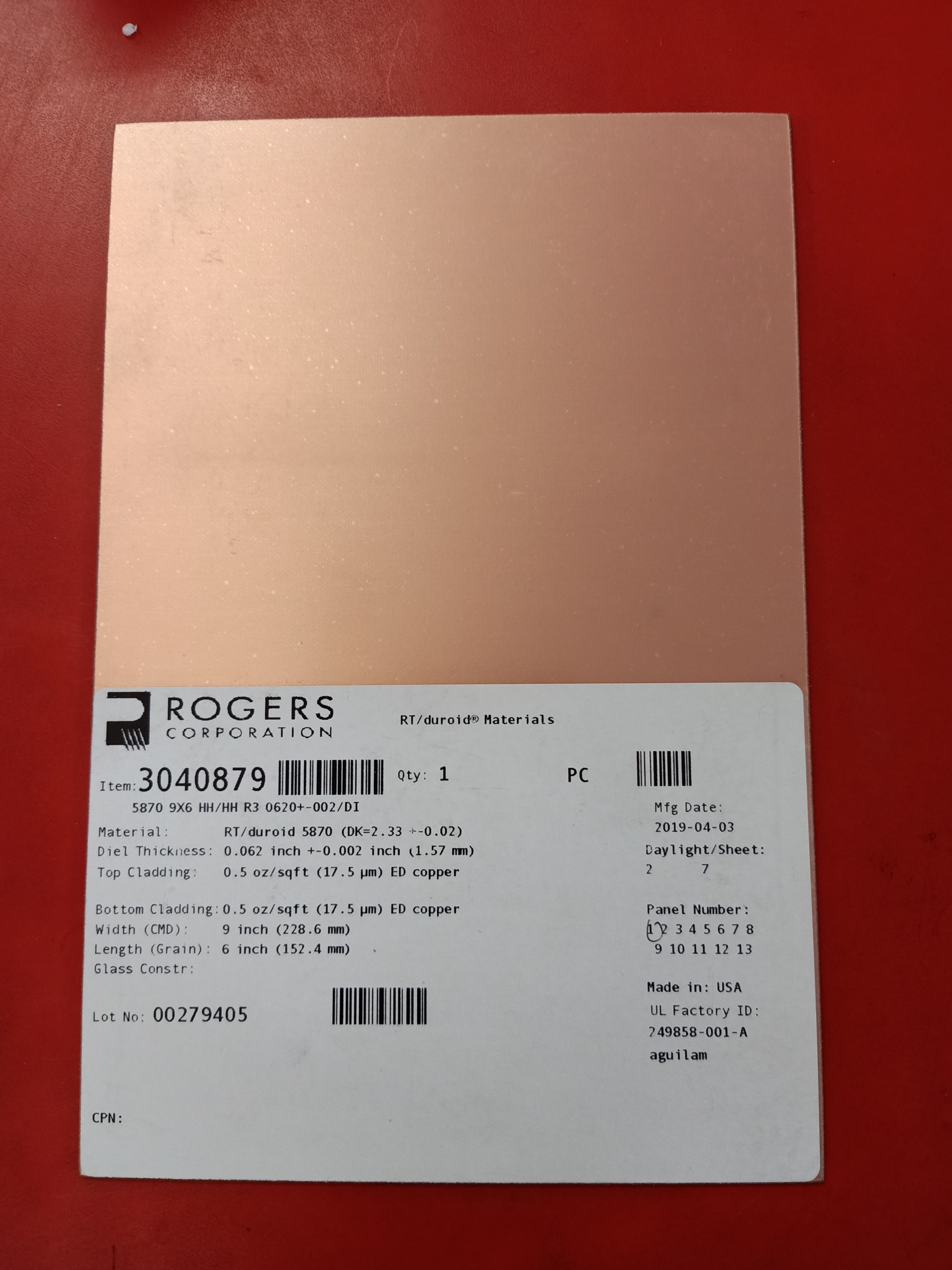
PCB Duroid material

In March 2020 Rogers filed a complaint against ElastaPro for trade secret violations, claiming that this company had unlawfully obtained Rogers' technical formulations and manufacturing know-how.
