= Liquid Monster =

Studio album by Brainstorm
- Released: 4 April 2005
- Recorded: House of Music Studios, Winterbach, November–December 2004
- Genre: Power metal
- Length: 51:21
- Label: Metal Blade
- Producer: Brainstorm

Brainstorm chronology
Soul Temptation (2003)	Liquid Monster (2005)	Downburst (2008)

Liquid Monster is the sixth album by the German metal band Brainstorm, released in 2005. The limited edition digipak and the Japanese edition contain a DVD with the documentary Streets, Stages & Studios and bonus tracks. "All Those Words" was released as a single.

Norway's Scream Magazine gave a 5 out of 6 score, calling it a "fine power metal album" and a bit more varied than their previous two to three releases. Rock Hard gave a similar score, 8.5 out of 10. Liquid Monster was both powerful and catchy enough to distance its competitors. Metal.de rated the album even higher, at 9 out of 10. Liquid Monster contained "the best power metal you can get in Germany and far, far beyond". After a few listens, it became clear that the songwriting was "even more compelling, mature, and sophisticated" than before.

Powermetal.de published two reviews of the same album. They agreed that the album was excellent. The band "managed to exceed the undoubtedly very high expectations"; "I can't for the life of me find a single weak point".

== Track listing ==
All songs written and arranged by Brainstorm.

1. "Worlds Are Comin' Through" – 4:55
2. "Inside the Monster" – 4:55
3. "All Those Words" – 4:05
4. "Lifeline" – 3:05
5. "Invisible Enemy" – 4:20
6. "Heavenly" – 5:33
7. "Painside" – 5:42
8. "Despair to Drown" – 3:51
9. "Mask of Life" – 5:20
10. "Even Higher" – 4:22
11. "Burns My Soul" – 5:13

Bonus tracks

1. "Before the Dawn" - 3:25 (Judas Priest cover, digipack edition bonus track)
2. "Breathe" (Japanese edition bonus track)

== Personnel ==
Band members

- Andy B. Franck - lead and backing vocals
- Torsten Ihlenfeld - guitars, backing vocals
- Milan Loncaric - guitars and backing vocals
- Andreas Mailänder - bass
- Dieter Bernert - drums

Additional musicians

- Ferdy Doernberg- keyboards
- Michael 'Miro' Rodenberg - keyboards on tracks 3 and 9
- Carmen Schäper - vocals

Production

- Achim Köhler - engineer, mixing, mastering
- Ingmar Schelzel - engineer, mixing
- Dennis Ward - drum editing
