= Joseph Lutz =

Joseph Lutz may refer to:

- Joseph Lutz (general), United States Army general
- Joseph Lutz (politician), member of the Maryland House of Delegates

== See also ==
- Joe Lutz, American baseball player and coach
- Josef Lutz, German physicist and electrical engineer.
