= Olfa Kanoun =

Tunisian electrical engineer

Olfa Kanoun is a Tunisian electrical engineer and Chair of Measurement and Sensor Technology at the Chemnitz University of Technology (TU Chemnitz), a position she has held since 2007.

== Career development ==
Kanoun was born in Tunisia and during her high school years there, she was "among the top 100 high school graduates of 1988 and received a government scholarship."

She completed her studies in electrical engineering and information technology at the Technical University of Munich in 1995. She received her doctorate from the University of the Bundeswehr Munich in 2001. Her thesis "Kalibrationsfreie Temperaturmessung" was awarded the research prize of the Arbeitskreis der Hochschullehrer für Messtechnik (AHMT e. V.). She then founded the Impedance Spectroscopy working group at the Institute for Measurement and Automation Technology, at the University of the Bundeswehr Munich. She also established the German Instrumentation and Measurement Chapter of the Institute of Electrical and Electronics Engineers (IEEE). She continues to lead that group.

Her habilitation took place abroad.

From 2006 to 2007, she was substitute professor for measurement technology at the University of Kassel. In 2007, she became professor for measurement and sensor technology at the Chemnitz University of Technology.

== Research ==
Kanoun's research deals with sensors, measurement systems and measurement methods. Among other things, it develops new sensors and new measurement solutions based on impedance spectroscopy. Applications include battery diagnosis and material tests. She also develops force, temperature and humidity measurements.

== Awards ==
She was recognized for excellence in the field on the National Day of Women of Tunisia on 12 August 2015. The Tunisian capital, Tunis, was the site of the ceremony.
