= Midnight Ghost =

Studio album by Brainstorm
- Released: 28 September 2018
- Recorded: March-May 2018
- Studio: Greenman Studios, Arnsberg, Germany; Delta Metal Meeting, Mannheim, Germany
- Genre: Heavy metal, power metal
- Length: 51:38
- Label: AFM
- Producer: Sebastian "Seeb" Levermann

Brainstorm chronology
Scary Creatures (2016)	Midnight Ghost (2018)	Wall of Skulls (2021)

Professional ratings
Review scores
Source	Rating
Metal Express Radio	8.5/10
Metal.de	8/10
Powermetal.de	10/10
Rock Hard	8.5/10
Zephyr's Odem	8.5/10

Midnight Ghost is the twelfth studio album by German heavy metal band Brainstorm, released on 28 September 2018.

== Track listing ==
1. "Devil's Eye" - 4:36
2. "Revealing the Darkness" - 4:46
3. "Ravenous Minds" - 5:02
4. "The Pyre" - 4:20
5. "Jeanne Boulet (1764)" - 7:47
6. "Divine Inner Ghost" - 4:38
7. "When Pain Becomes Real" - 4:58
8. "The Four Blessings" - 4:52
9. "Haunting Voices" - 5:46
10. "The Path" - 4:53

== Personnel ==
- Andy B. Franck – vocals
- Torsten Ihlenfeld – guitars, backing vocals
- Milan Loncaric – guitars, backing vocals
- Antonio Ieva – bass
- Dieter Bernert – drums
