= Plague of Rats =

Studio album by Brainstorm
- Released: 28 February 2025
- Recorded: May–July 2024
- Studios: Greenman Studios, Arnsberg, Germany
- Genres: Heavy metal, power metal
- Length: 45:30
- Label: Reigning Phoenix
- Producer: Sebastian "Seeb" Levermann

Brainstorm chronology
Wall of Skulls (2021)	Plague of Rats (2025)

Plague of Rats is the fourteenth studio album by German heavy metal band Brainstorm, released on 28 February 2025. It is their only album with bassist Jim Ramses and their last one with founding drummer Dieter Bernert.

Professional ratings
Review scores
Source	Rating
Metal.de	7/10
Powermetal.de	8/10
Rock Hard	9/10
Rocks (magazine)	8/10
Zephyr's Odem	8.7/10

== Track listing ==
1. "Beyond Enemy Lines" – 6:37
2. "Garuda (Eater of Snakes)" – 4:15
3. "False Memories" – 4:20
4. "The Shepherd Girl (Gitagovinda)" – 3:30
5. "Your Soul That Lingers in Me" (featuring Elina Siirala) – 4:23
6. "Masquerade Conspiracy" – 4:42
7. "From Hell" (featuring Alexander Krull) – 4:13
8. "The Dark of Night" – 5:13
9. "Crawling" – 4:37
10. "Curtains Fall" – 3:40

== Personnel ==
- Andy B. Franck – vocals
- Torsten Ihlenfeld – guitars, backing vocals
- Milan Loncaric – guitars, backing vocals
- Jim Ramses – bass
- Dieter Bernert – drums
