= Josef Lutz =

German physicist and electrical engineer (born 1954)

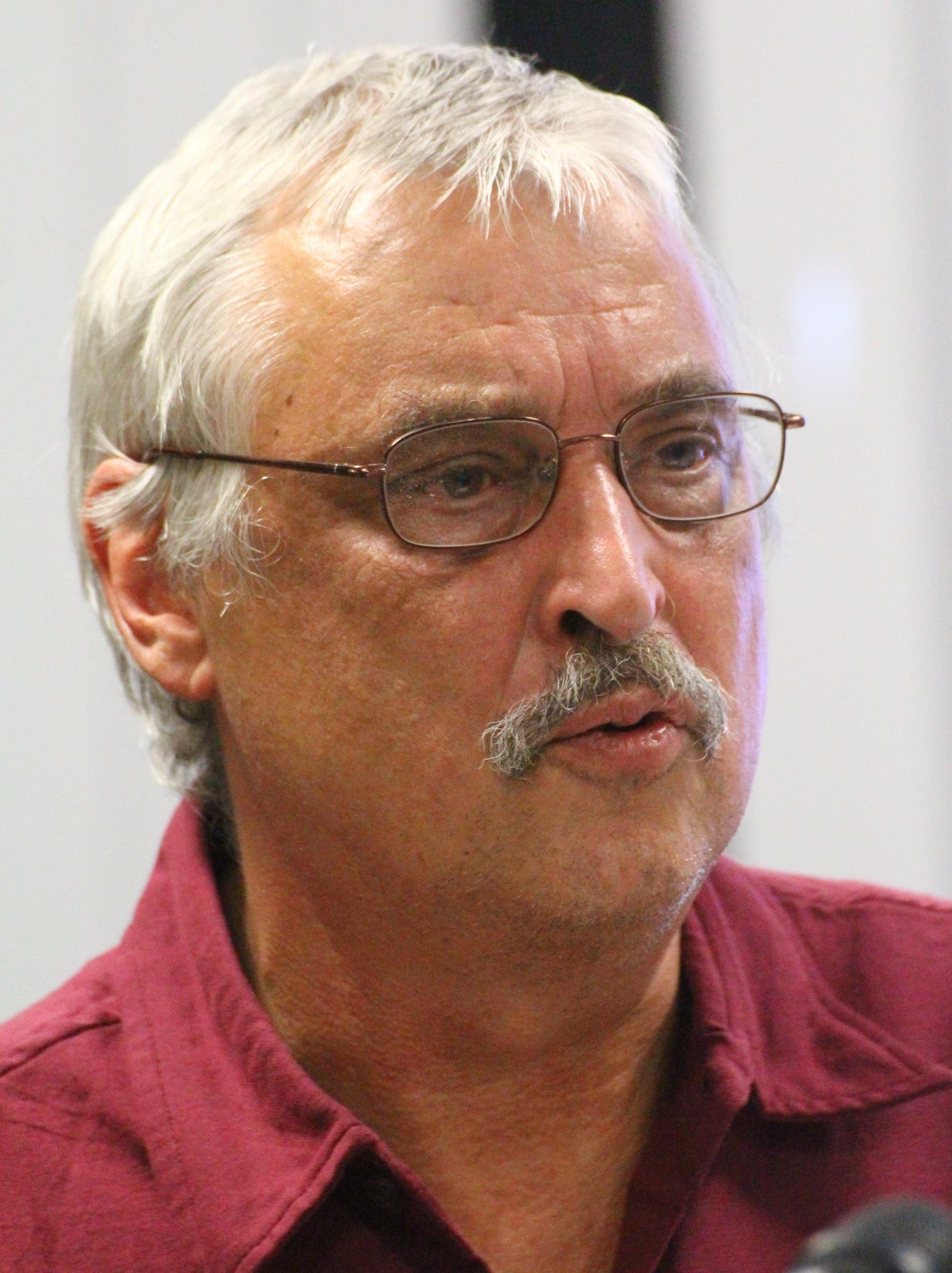
Josef Lutz

Josef Lutz (born 1954 in Ellwangen (Jagst)) is a German physicist and electrical engineer.

== Career ==
Lutz grew up in a small village called Baldern in the southern part of Germany, his father was smith and farmer. In 1973, Lutz received his high-school diploma from the Theodor-Heuss-Gymnasium, Aalen. He studied Physics at the University of Stuttgart and received his Diploma in Physics in 1982. After his military service he joined Semikron Electronics in Nuremberg. The main focus of his work was on Gate turn-off thyristor and fast diodes. In 1999, he graduated as PhD in Electrical Engineering from the Technische Universität Ilmenau, Germany. Since August 2001, he has been Professor of the Chair of Power Electronics and Electromagnetic Compatibility at TU Chemnitz. He is senior member of IEEE, member of the board of directors of the PCIM Europe, member of the board of directors of the ZfM, of the International Steering Committee of the EPE, the Technical Committee of the ISPSD, the Program Committee of the ISPS, the Technical Program Committee of the CIPS and member of the Editorial Advisory Board of Microelectronics Reliability. In 2005, he was awarded with the degree of Honorable Professor by the North-Caucasus Federal University, Russia. Josef Lutz is among the top 1 percent of the world's most cited researchers in their field.

== Inventions ==
Lutz invented the Controlled Axial Lifetime (CAL) diode, a fast, soft freewheeling diode with the best properties in the world. The CAL diode was the first diode with soft recovery behavior under all application relevant conditions. It allows to use the fast switching capability of the IGBT. It has been produced in high volumes since 1995. Due to its lower conduction losses, the CAL diode has led to energy savings in the range of several large power plants in the GW-Range. Lutz is inventor or co-inventor of more than 25 patents held by Semikron and Infineon.

== Scientific work ==
Lutz´s university research focuses on ruggedness of power semiconductor devices, on packaging related reliability as well as on electromobility. He is involved in several national and international research projects. Lutz has published more than 270 scientific articles and conference contributions. His main publication is the book "Semiconductor Power Devices – Physics, Characteristics, Reliability", printed in German (first edition 2006, second edition 2012), and together with Heinrich Schlangenotto, Uwe Scheuermann and Rik De Doncker in English (first edition 2011, second edition 2018) and in Chinese (2013).

== International electrical engineer’s education ==
At every PCIM Conference Lutz is instructor of the tutorials on "Reliability of IGBT Power Modules". Several of his statements have been published in the PCIM Europe Community Dialogue. Additionally, he gave several tutorials on "Power Device Ruggedness" and on "Transit Time Oscillations in IGBT Power Modules" in Germany, France, Norway and even three times invited in Japan. In September 2017, Lutz received the international Outstanding Achievements Award in the field of Power Electronics at the European Conference on Power Electronics and Applications (EPE 2017).

== Critical science ==
Lutz is one of the speakers of the Open Academy, an institution for advanced and critical science. He is opponent of the Big Bang theory. He was one of the speakers at the 1st Crisis in Cosmology Conference, whose proceedings were published by the American Institute of Physics. A further critical science conference contribution is "Objections against the current limits for microwave radiation". Lutz is strongly engaged in environmental protection activities.
