= Ambiguity (album) =

Studio album by Brainstorm
- Released: 11 July 2000
- Recorded: 2000
- Studios: House of Music Studios, Winterbach, Germany
- Genre: Power metal
- Length: 62:35
- Label: Metal Blade
- Producers: Dirk Schlächter & Brainstorm

Brainstorm chronology
Unholy (1998)	Ambiguity (2000)	Metus Mortis (2001)

Professional ratings
Review scores
Source	Rating
BraveWords	7/10
RevelationZ	8.5/10 stars
Rock Hard	9/10 stars

Ambiguity is the third album by German metal band Brainstorm, released in 2000. This was the first album with Andy B. Franck on vocals.

== Track listing ==
All songs written and arranged by Brainstorm, all lyrics by Andy B. Franck.

1. "Crush Depth" – 6:06
2. "Tear Down the Walls" – 3:54
3. "Beyond My Destiny" – 8:41
4. "Arena" – 3:53
5. "Coming Closer" – 5:52
6. "Darkest Silence" – 0:54
7. "Maharaja Palace" – 5:27
8. "Far Away" – 5:47
9. "Demonsion" – 6:36
10. "Revenant" – 4:44 (limited edition bonus track)
11. "Lost Unseen" – 6:14
12. "Perception of Life" – 4:27

== Personnel ==
- Andy B. Franck – lead and backing vocals
- Torsten Ihlenfeld – guitar, keyboards and backing vocals, engineer
- Milan Loncaric – guitar and backing vocals
- Andreas Mailänder – bass
- Dieter Bernert – drums

Additional musicians

- Michael 'Miro' Rodenberg – keyboards

Production

- Dirk Schlächter – producer, engineer, backing vocals
- Sascha Paeth – mixing, mastering
