= Firesoul =

Studio album by Brainstorm
- Released: 4 April 2014
- Recorded: 2013
- Studios: House of Music Studios u3multimedia Studios; Storm Your Brain Studios
- Genres: Heavy metal, power metal
- Length: 47:55
- Label: AFM
- Producer: Achim Köhler

Brainstorm chronology
On the Spur of the Moment (2011)	Firesoul (2014)	Scary Creatures (2016)

Professional ratings
Review scores
Source	Rating
Metal Express Radio	7.5/10
Metal.de	8/10
Powermetal.de	9/10
Rock Hard	8/10
Zephyr's Odem	9/10

Firesoul is the tenth studio album by German heavy metal band Brainstorm, released on 4 April 2014.

== Track listing ==
1. "Erased by the Dark" - 4:35
2. "Firesoul" - 4:15
3. "Descendants of the Fire" - 4:47
4. "Entering Solitude" - 4:51
5. "Recall the Real" - 6:21
6. "Shadowseeker" - 4:04
7. "Feed Me Lies" - 4:52
8. "What Grows Inside" - 3:54
9. "The Chosen" - 4:46
10. "...And I Wonder" - 5:30
11. "Disappeared" - 4:03 (bonus track on digipack edition)
12. "Strangled" - 4:33 (bonus track on digipack edition)

== Personnel ==
- Andy B. Franck – vocals
- Torsten Ihlenfeld – guitars, backing vocals
- Milan Loncaric – guitars, backing vocals
- Antonio Ieva – bass
- Dieter Bernert – drums
