= Werner Dilger =

German computer scientist (1942–2007)

Werner Dilger (March 24, 1942 in Winterbach; July 17, 2007 in Chemnitz) was a German professor of computer science and held the chair for artificial intelligences at the Chemnitz. His last major area of research was the study of artificial immune systems.

== Biography ==
Dilger studied Protestant theology and attended a basic study of mathematics. Then he turned to the computer science, the study of which he finished in Karlsruhe in 1974 as a computer scientist. At the University of Kaiserslautern received his doctorate and he qualified.

From 1989 to 1993 he was professor of applied computing at the EBS University of Business and Law Castle Reichartshausen. Between 1993 and 1997 he worked the Technical University of Chemnitz as professor of Artificial Intelligence.

He was involved in setting up data mining company Prudsys AG in 1998. Dilger chaired the supervisory board at Prudsys AG between 2002 and 2006.

He died in a swimming accident in June 2007.

== Activities ==
- Initiator of the Data Mining Cup
- Co-initiator of the robotics club at the TU Chemnitz

== Publications (selection) ==
- Dilger, W .; Strangfeld, S .: Properties of the Bersini experiment on self-assertion. Proceedings of the Genetic and Evolutionary Computing conference (GECCO) 2006 , Seattle, WA. 95–102, ISBN 1-59593-186-4
- Schadwinkel, S., Dilger, W .: A dynamic approach to artificial immune systems Utilizing neural networks. Proceedings of the Genetic and Evolutionary Computing Conference (GECCO) 2006 , Seattle, WA, 131–134, ISBN 1-59593-186-4
- Dilger, W .: Structural properties of shape-spaces. Proceedings of the 5th International Conference on Artificial Immune Systems (Icaris 2006) , Oeiras, Portugal, Springer LNCS, 178–192, ISBN 3-540-37749-2
- Lehmann, M., Dilger, W .: Controlling the heating system of an intelligent home with on artificial immune system. Proceedings of the 5th International Conference on Artificial Immune Systems (Icaris 2006) , Oeiras, Portugal, Springer LNCS, 335–348, ISBN 3-540-37749-2
- Dilger, W .: analysis of spatial data (spatial data mining) . In: Koch, W. G. Theory 2003 - 8th Dresdner summer school of Cartography , September 2003. TU Dresden, Institute of Cartography, 2004 29 - 41, ISBN 3-86005-410-4: (ed.).
- Dilger, W .: Decentralized autonomous organization of the intelligent home gemäß to the principle of the immune system (1997)
