= Brainstorm (German band) =

German power metal band

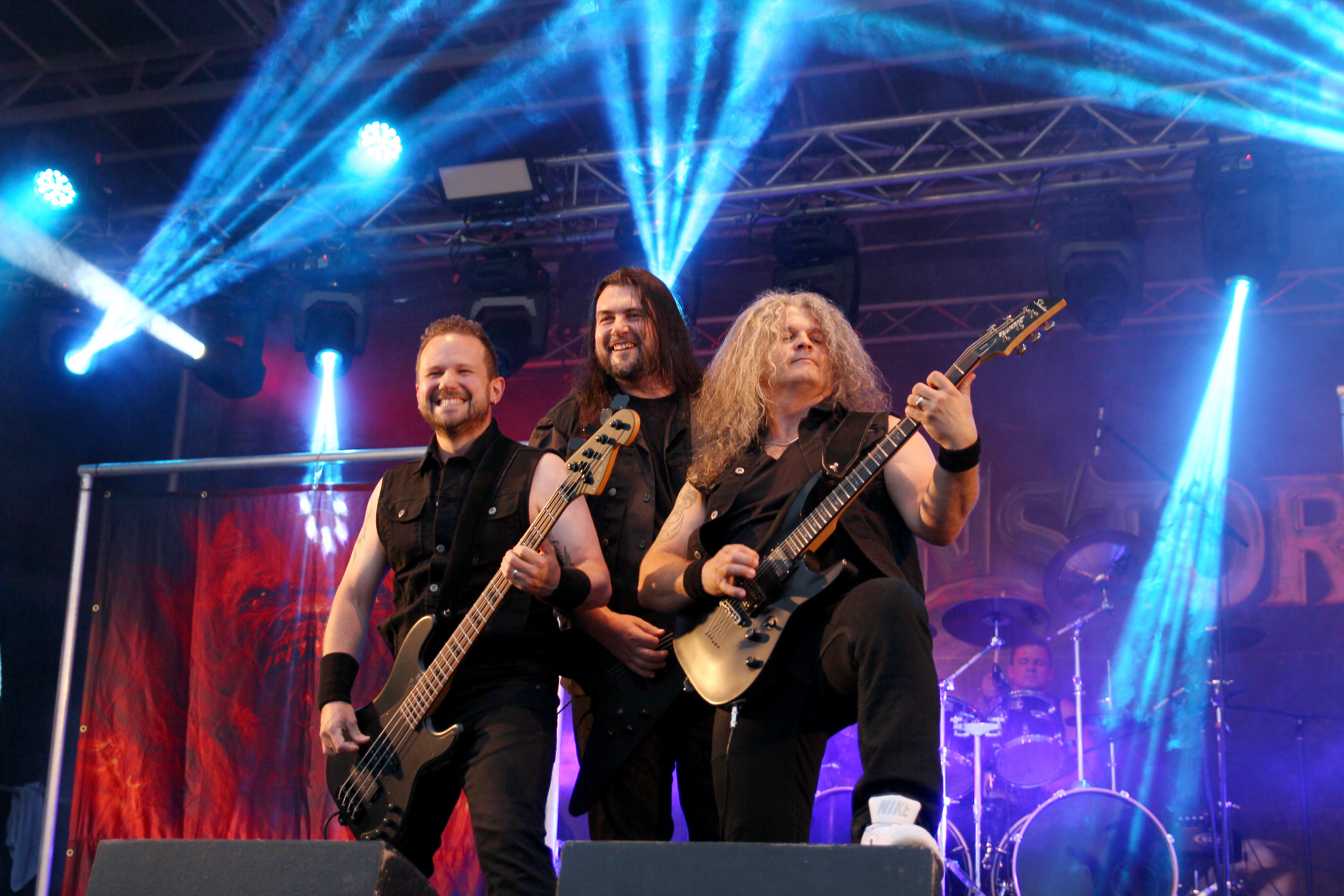
- Brainstorm in 2014

Background information
- Origin: Heidenheim, Germany
- Genres: Power metal, heavy metal
- Years active: 1989–present
- Label: Reigning Phoenix Music
- Website: brainstorm-web.net

Brainstorm is a German power metal band formed in 1989 by guitarists Torsten Ihlenfeld and Milan Loncaric, and drummer Dieter Bernert. The band features lead singer Andy B. Franck, who is also noted for his other band, Symphorce. They are known to play a somewhat darker style of music than most power metal groups.

== Band members ==
Current

- Torsten Ihlenfeld – guitars, backing vocals (1989–present)
- Milan Loncaric – guitars, backing vocals (1989–present)
- Andy B. Franck – vocals (1999–present)
- Danij Perl – bass (2026–present)
- Kevin Lütolf – drums (2026–present)

Former

- Dieter Bernert – drums (1989–2026)
- Stefan Fronk – vocals (1990–1991)
- Marcus Jürgens – vocals (1991–1999)
- Henning Basse – vocals (live, 1998–1999)
- Peter Waldstätter – bass (1990)
- Andreas Mailänder – bass (1990–2007)
- Antonio Ieva – bass (2007–2022)
- Andreas Armbruster – bass (2022–2024)
- Jim Ramses – bass (2024–2026)

== Discography ==
Studio albums

- Hungry (1997)
- Unholy (1998)
- Ambiguity (2000)
- Metus Mortis (2001)
- Soul Temptation (2003)
- Liquid Monster (2005)
- Downburst (2008)
- Memorial Roots (2009)
- On the Spur of the Moment (2011)
- Firesoul (2014)
- Scary Creatures (2016)
- Midnight Ghost (2018)
- Wall of Skulls (2021)
- Plague of Rats (2025)
- Nightfall (2027)

Compilation albums

- Just Highs No Lows (12 Years of Persistence) (2009)

Singles

- "All Those Words" (2005)
- "Fire Walk with Me" (2007)

DVDs

- Honey from the B's (Beasting Around the Bush) (2007)
