= Wall of Skulls =

Studio album by Brainstorm
- Released: 17 September 2021
- Recorded: October 2020 - April 2021
- Studio: Greenman Studios; Gate Studios
- Genre: Heavy metal, power metal
- Length: 44:33
- Label: AFM
- Producer: Sebastian "Seeb" Levermann

Brainstorm chronology
Midnight Ghost (2018)	Wall of Skulls (2021)	Plague of Rats (2025)

Professional ratings
Review scores
Source	Rating
Metal Express Radio	9.1/10
Metal.de	8/10
Powermetal.de	9/10
Rock Hard	9/10
Rocks (magazine)	8/10
Zephyr's Odem	9/10

Wall of Skulls is the thirteenth studio album by German heavy metal band Brainstorm, released on 17 September 2021. It is their last album with longtime bassist Antonio Ieva.

== Track listing ==
1. "Chamber Thirteen" - 1:53
2. "Where Ravens Fly" - 4:15
3. "Solitude" - 4:35
4. "Escape the Silence" (featuring Peter "Peavy" Wagner (Rage)) - 4:20
5. "Turn Off the Light" (featuring Sebastian "Seeb" Levermann (Orden Ogan, Angus McSix)) - 3:30
6. "Glory Disappears (Black from Grey)" - 3:47
7. "My Dystopia" - 4:30
8. "End of My Innocence" - 4:39
9. "Stigmatized (Shadows Fall)" - 4:13
10. "Holding On" - 4:37
11. "I, the Deceiver" - 4:14

== Personnel ==
- Andy B. Franck – vocals
- Torsten Ihlenfeld – guitars, backing vocals
- Milan Loncaric – guitars, backing vocals
- Antonio Ieva – bass
- Dieter Bernert – drums
