= Power module =

Electronics module

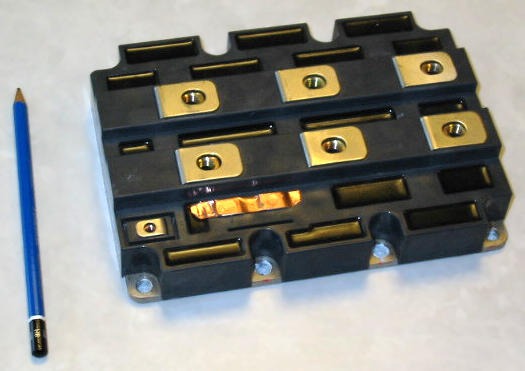
High power IGBTs (here a 3300V, 1200A switch) are obtained by connecting tens of dies in parallel in a power module.

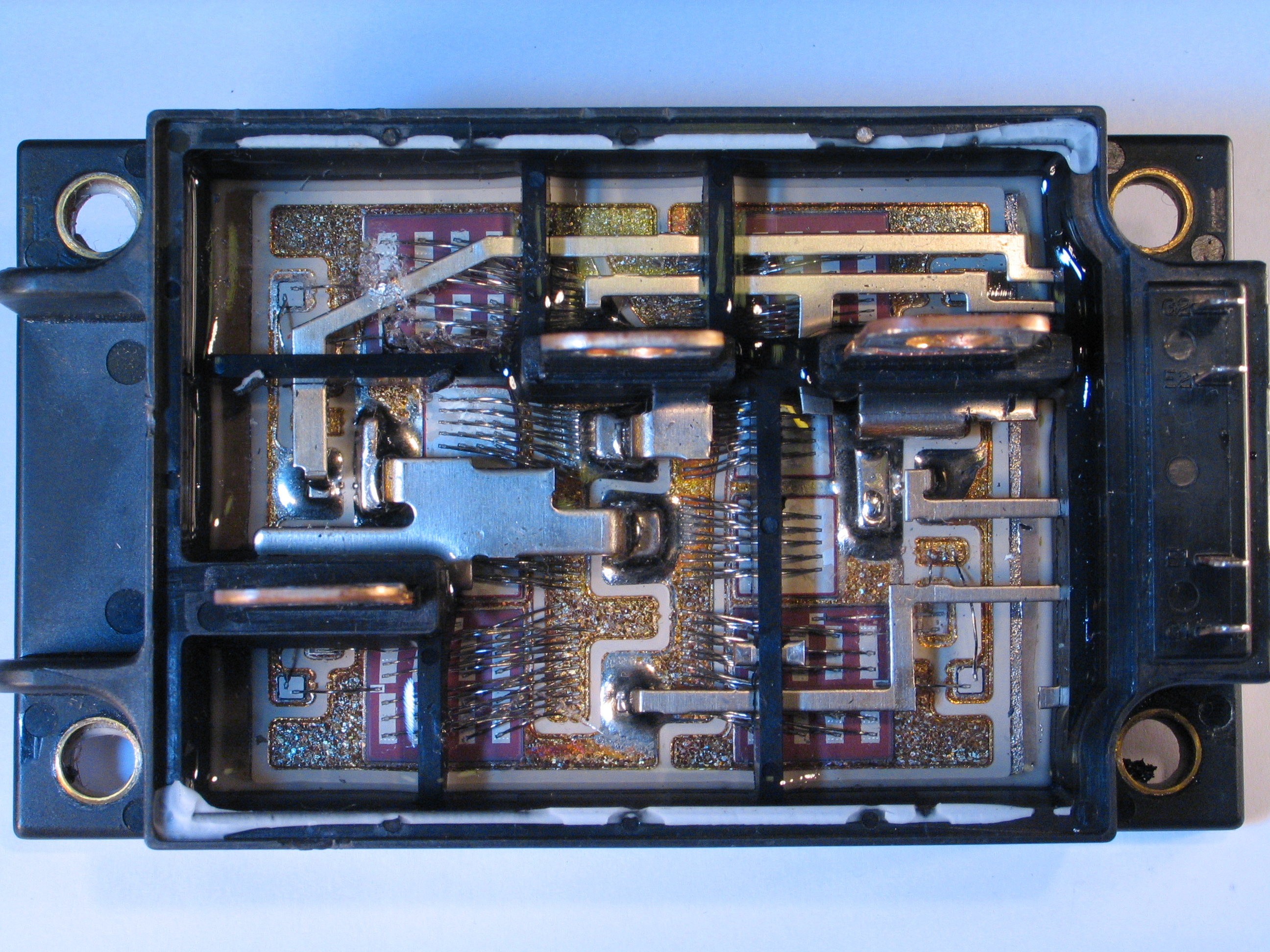
Opened IGBT module; different semiconductor dies are connected via wire bonds while external connectors are connected to lead-frame structures

A power module or power electronic module provides the physical containment for several power components, usually power semiconductor devices. These power semiconductors (so-called dies) are typically soldered or sintered on a power electronic substrate that carries the power semiconductors, provides electrical and thermal contact and electrical insulation where needed. Compared to discrete power semiconductors in plastic housings as TO-247 or TO-220, power packages provide a higher power density and are in many cases more reliable.

== History ==
Power modules trace their roots to the mid-20th century, when power switching was handled by discrete bipolar junction transistors (BJTs) and, later, a Darlington pair mounted in screw-terminal packages. These early assemblies offered high current gain but suffered from bulky form factors, limited thermal performance, and complex wiring.

In 1974, Semikron introduced the SemiPack 1, the first commercially available “potential-free” hybrid power module. It was available in a variety of connection layouts using both diodes and thyristors. “Potential-free” meant that the module’s metal baseplate is electrically isolated from its semiconductor circuitry, allowing direct mounting to a heatsink without additional insulation.

During the 1980s, module packaging evolved with the adoption of direct-bonded copper (DBC) substrates and insulated metal substrates (IMS), boosting thermal cycling resilience. Additionally, as the technology advanced over time, the gate‐drive requirements grew more sophisticated.

The early 1990s saw the commercial rise of IGBT (Insulated Gate Bipolar Transistor) modules. By combining MOSFET‐like gate control with BJT current capacity, IGBTs rapidly displaced Darlington‐based designs in 600–1,200 V classes. Half-bridge modules, complete with built-in antiparallel freewheeling diodes (FWD), became ubiquitous in power modules.

Through the 2000s, power modules integrated on‐board temperature sensors - both substrate-mounted NTC thermistors as well as on-chip temperature sense diodes, gate‐driver ICs, and fault‐protection circuits, giving birth to the first “smart” power modules. Substrate materials and molding compounds continued to improve, extending lifetimes under harsh power cycling.

More recently, wide-bandgap devices, such as SiC MOSFETs, have entered power‐module form factors, offering higher switching frequencies, lower losses, and smaller footprints. Hybrid modules pairing SiC Schottky barrier diodes with silicon IGBTs, and full SiC modules, demonstrate the continual drive to push performance while leveraging existing package platforms.

== Module Topologies ==
Besides modules that contain a single power electronic switch (as MOSFET, IGBT, BJT, Thyristor, GTO or JFET) or diode, classical power modules contain multiple semiconductor dies that are connected to form an electrical circuit of a certain structure, called topology. Modules also contain other components such as ceramic capacitors to minimize switching voltage overshoots and NTC thermistors to monitor the module's substrate temperature. Examples of broadly available topologies implemented in modules are:

- switch (MOSFET, IGBT), with antiparallel Diode;
- bridge rectifier containing four (1-phase) or six (3-phase) diodes
- half bridge (inverter leg, with two switches and their corresponding antiparallel diodes)
- H-Bridge (four switches and the corresponding antiparallel diodes)
- boost or power factor correction (one (or two) switches with one (or two) high frequency rectifying diodes)
- ANPFC (power factor correction leg with two switches and their corresponding antiparallel diodes and four high frequency rectifying diodes)
- three level NPC (I-Type) (multilevel inverter leg with four switches and their corresponding antiparallel diodes)
- three level MNPC (T-Type) (multilevel inverter leg with four switches and their corresponding antiparallel diodes)
- three level ANPC (multilevel inverter leg with six switches and their corresponding antiparallel diodes)
- three level H6.5 - (consisting of six switches (four fast IGBTs/two slower IGBTs) and five fast diodes)
- three-phase inverter (six switches and the corresponding antiparallel diodes)
- Power Interface Module (PIM) - (consisting of the input rectifier, power factor correction and inverter stages)
- Intelligent Power Module (IPM) - (consisting of the power stages with their dedicated gate drive protection circuits. May also be integrated with the input rectifier and power factor correction stages.)

== Electrical Interconnection Technologies ==
Additional to the traditional screw contacts the electrical connection between the module and other parts of the power electronic system can also be achieved by pin contacts (soldered onto a PCB), press-fit contacts pressed into PCB vias, spring contacts that inherently press on contact areas of a PCB or by pure pressure contact where corrosion-proof surface areas are directly pressed together. Press-fit pins achieve a very high reliability and ease the mounting process without the need for soldering. Compared to press-fit connections, spring contacts have the benefit of allowing easy and non-destructive removal of the connection several times, as for inspection or replacement of a module, for instance. Both contact types have rather limited current-carrying capability due to their comparatively low cross-sectional area and small contact surface. Therefore, modules often contain multiple pins or springs for each of the electrical power connections.

== Current Research and Development ==
The current focus in R&D is on cost reduction, increase of power density, increase of reliability and reduction of parasitic lumped elements. These parasitics are unwanted capacitances between circuit parts and inductances of circuit traces. Both can have negative effects on the electromagnetic radiation (EMR) of the module if it is operated as an inverter, for instance. Another problem connected to parasitics is their negative impact on the switching behavior and the switching loss of the power semiconductors. Therefore, manufacturers work on minimizing the parasitic elements of their modules while keeping cost low and maintain a high degree of interchangeability of their modules with those of a second source (other manufacturer). A further aspect for optimization is the so-called thermal path between the heat source (the dies) and the heat-sink. The heat has to pass through different physical layers such as solder, DCB, baseplate, thermal interface material (TIM) and the bulk of the heat-sink, until it is transferred to a gaseous medium such as air or a fluid medium such as water or oil. Since modern silicon-carbide power semiconductors show a larger power density, the requirements for heat transfer are increasing.

== Applications ==
Power modules are used for power conversion equipment such as industrial motor drives, embedded motor drives, uninterruptible power supplies, AC-DC power supplies and in welder power supplies.

Power modules are also widely found in inverters for renewable energies as wind turbines, solar power panels, tidal power plants and electric vehicles (EVs).

== Manufacturers ==
- APEI
- Eltek
- Vishay
- Danfoss
- StarPower
- Infineon
- Mitsubishi
- Semikron
- ROHM
- Vincotech
- Dynex Semiconductor
- CREE
- AT&S
- Fuji Electric
- WeEn Semiconductors

== See also ==
- Powerpack (drivetrain)
- Power-egg
- Prime mover
