= Honey from the B's (Beasting Around the Bush) =

Video by Brainstorm
- Released: 2007
- Genre: Heavy metal / Power metal
- Length: 5 hours 1 min 7 sec
- Label: Metal Blade Records

Honey from the B's (Beasting Around the Bush) is Brainstorm's first heavy metal DVD with 5 hours of material across two discs. The set contains three live shows, a history of the band, promotional videos and some more "live clip-mix" from various locations.

== Disc 1 ==
=== Live In Budapest, 2005 ===
1. "Worlds Are Coming Through"
2. "Blind Suffering"
3. "The Leading"
4. "Voices"
5. "Highs Without Lows"
6. Medley -> "Lifeline / Shadowland / Tear Down The Walls"
7. "Inside A Monster"
8. "Shiva's Tears"
9. "Fornever"
10. "Soul Temptation"
11. "All Those Words"
12. "Hollow Hideaway"
13. "Burns My Soul"
14. "Doorway To Survive"
15. "Under Lights"

=== Live At Wacken Open Air, 2004 ===
1. "Shiva's Tears"
2. "Blind Suffering"
3. "Doorway To Survive"
4. "Hollow Hideaway"
5. "Fornever"
6. "The Leading"
7. "Highs Without Lows"
8. "Under Lights"

== Disc 2 ==
=== Live At Prog Power Festival, 2004 ===
1. "Shiva's Tears"
2. "Blind Suffering"
3. "Crush Depth"
4. "Doorway To Survive"
5. "Voices"
6. "Hollow Hideaway"
7. "Fornever"
8. "The Leading"
9. "Highs Without Lows"
10. "Under Lights"

=== Live At Sziget Festival, 2006 ===
1. "Worlds Are Coming Through"
2. "Painside"
3. "Inside A Monster"
4. "All Those Words"

=== Live In Greece, 2000 ===
1. "Crush Depth" (Athens)
2. "Holy War" (Thessaloniki)

=== Live At Bang Your Head-Festival, 2003 ===
1. "Shiva's Tears"

=== Live At Rock Hard Open Air, 2006 ===
1. "Worlds Are Coming Through"
2. "Invisible Enemy"
3. "Shadowland"
4. "Painside"
5. "Doorway To Survive"
6. "All Those Words"

=== HISTORmY ===
Members of the band are talking band history.

=== Videos ===
1. "Highs Without Lows"
2. "Doorway To Survive"
3. "All Those Words"

== Band ==
- Andy B. Franck – vocals
- Torsten Ihlenfeld – guitars, backing vocals
- Milan Loncaric – guitars, backing vocals
- Andreas Mailänder – bass
- Dieter Bernert – drums
