= Unholy (Brainstorm album) =

Studio album by Brainstorm
- Released: 3 August 1998
- Recorded: 1998
- Studio: Hansen Studio, Hamburg, Soundworx Studio, Gerstetten, Germany
- Genre: Power metal, heavy metal
- Length: 60:50
- Label: B.O. Records
- Producer: Charlie Bauerfeind & Brainstorm

Brainstorm chronology
Hungry (1997)	Unholy (1998)	Ambiguity (2000)

Professional ratings
Review scores
Source	Rating
Rock Hard	8.5/10

Unholy is the second album by German metal band Brainstorm, released in 1998. On 23 March 2007 this album and Hungry were remastered by Achim Köhler and re-released by Century Media with four bonus tracks. Metal Blade Records reissued the album as a double CD with both the remastered and original version and all the bonus tracks.

== Track listing ==
All songs written by Brainstorm (except "Wooly Bully": music & lyrics by Domingo Samudio)

1. "MCMXCVIII" - 2:28
2. "Holy War" - 3:53
3. "Here Comes the Pain" - 3:50
4. "Voices" - 6:29
5. "The Healer" - 4:13
6. "Don't Stop Believing" - 6:50
7. "Heart of Hate" - 5:30
8. "Rebellion" - 5:46
9. "For the Love of Money" - 5:29
10. "Love Is a Lie" - 6:44
11. "Into the Fire" - 4:11
12. "Dog Days Coming Down" - 5:22

=== 1998 edition bonus tracks ===
1. "Wooly Bully"
2. "Up from the Ashes" (Japanese release)

=== 2007 remastered edition bonus tracks ===
1. "Heart of Hate" (demo)
2. "Valley of the Kings" (demo)
3. "The Other Side" (demo)
4. "Suck My Energy" (demo)

== Personnel ==
=== Band members ===
- Marcus Jürgens - lead vocals
- Torsten Ihlenfeld - guitars
- Milan Loncaric - guitars
- Andreas Mailänder - bass
- Dieter Bernert - drums

=== Additional musicians ===
- Michael Rodenberg - keyboards
- Uwe Hörmann - guitars
- Harald Sprengler - backing vocals

=== Production ===
- Charlie Bauerfeind - producer, mixing, mastering
- Dirk Schlächter, Uwe Hörmann, Harald Spengler - engineers
- Achim Köhler - re-mastering
