= Chemnitz University of Technology =

Public university in Chemnitz, Germany

- Technische Universität Chemnitz
- Type: Public
- Established: 1836/1986
- Budget: EUR 200.1 million (2024)
- Chancellor: Thomas Lang
- President: Gerd Strohmeier
- Academic staff: 2,410
- Students: 8,273
- Location: Chemnitz, Saxony, Germany; 50°48′49″N 12°55′45″E
- Website: www.tu-chemnitz.de

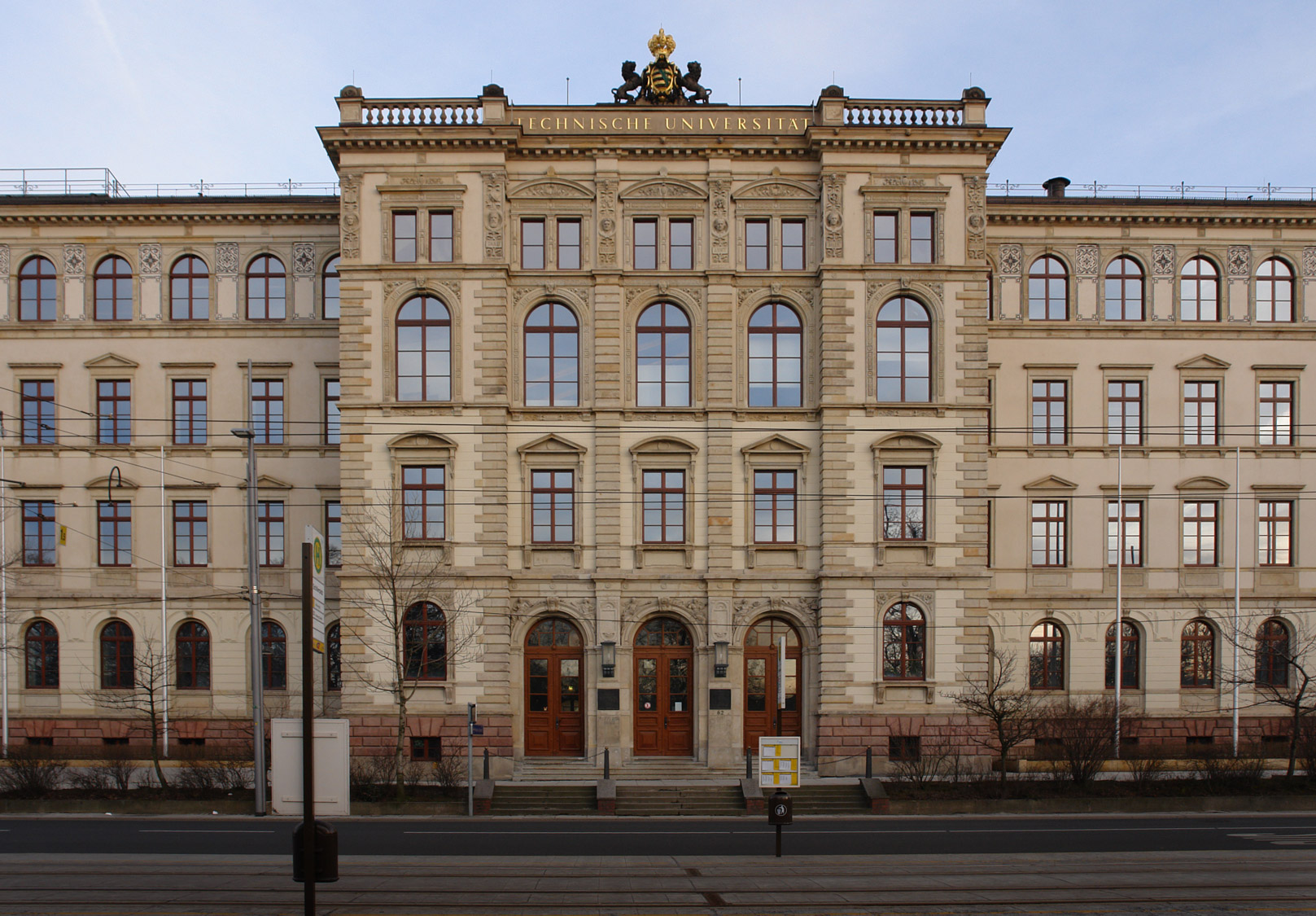
Chemnitz University of Technology, main building entrance, Straße der Nationen

Chemnitz University of Technology (German: Technische Universität Chemnitz) is a public university in Chemnitz, Germany. With around 8,300 students, it is the third largest university in Saxony. It was founded in 1836 as Königliche Gewerbschule (Royal Mercantile College) and was elevated to a Technische Hochschule, a university of technology, in 1963. With approximately 2,400 employees in science, engineering and management, Chemnitz University of Technology is among the most important employers in the region.

== History ==
=== Foundation ===
The tradition of science in this region goes back to the 16th century when Georg Agricola (1494–1555), a famous German scholar of minerals, served as the city's mayor. Historically, the university emerged from the Gewerbschule (trade school) founded in 1836. One year later, a Baugewerkenschule (school for the building trades) became affiliated with the Königliche Gewerbschule (Royal Trade School), which was followed by a Königliche Werkmeisterschule (Royal School for Master Craftsmen) in 1855. An existing Fabrikzeichenschule (Factory Mark School) in Chemnitz was affiliated to the Gewerbeschule at the time of its founding, but it was separated from the Gewerbschule for budgetary reasons in 1858. These four schools existed side by side and were unified by their director. In 1878, these schools were formally united in a school association – the Kasse der Technischen Staatslehranstalten (Office of the Technical Educational Institutions). The Gewerbeschule in particular, which was renamed the Gewerbeakademie in 1900 and the Staatliche Akademie für Technik (Public Academy of Technology) in 1929, achieved high recognition in Germany and a special position among the technical colleges and technical schools.

=== During the German Democratic Republic Era ===
After World War II, the association was reopened as a purely technical school under the name Technische Lehranstalten (Technical Academy) in 1947. In 1953, the Hochschule für Maschinenbau Karl-Marx-Stadt (Karl-Marx-Stadt College of Mechanical Engineering) was reestablished at the same location and in the same building. Over the course of the adjustment of the technical school landscape in the GDR, the old technical school was dissolved in 1955. The College of Mechanical Engineering was elevated to the status of a technical college in 1963 and to that of a technical university in 1986.

For basic Marxist–Leninist studies, which had been obligatory since 1951 for students of all disciplines in the GDR, there was also an Institute for Marxism–Leninism at the school. It later also had to take over the scientific staff, lecturers and professors' ongoing ideological training.

=== After Germany's Reunification ===
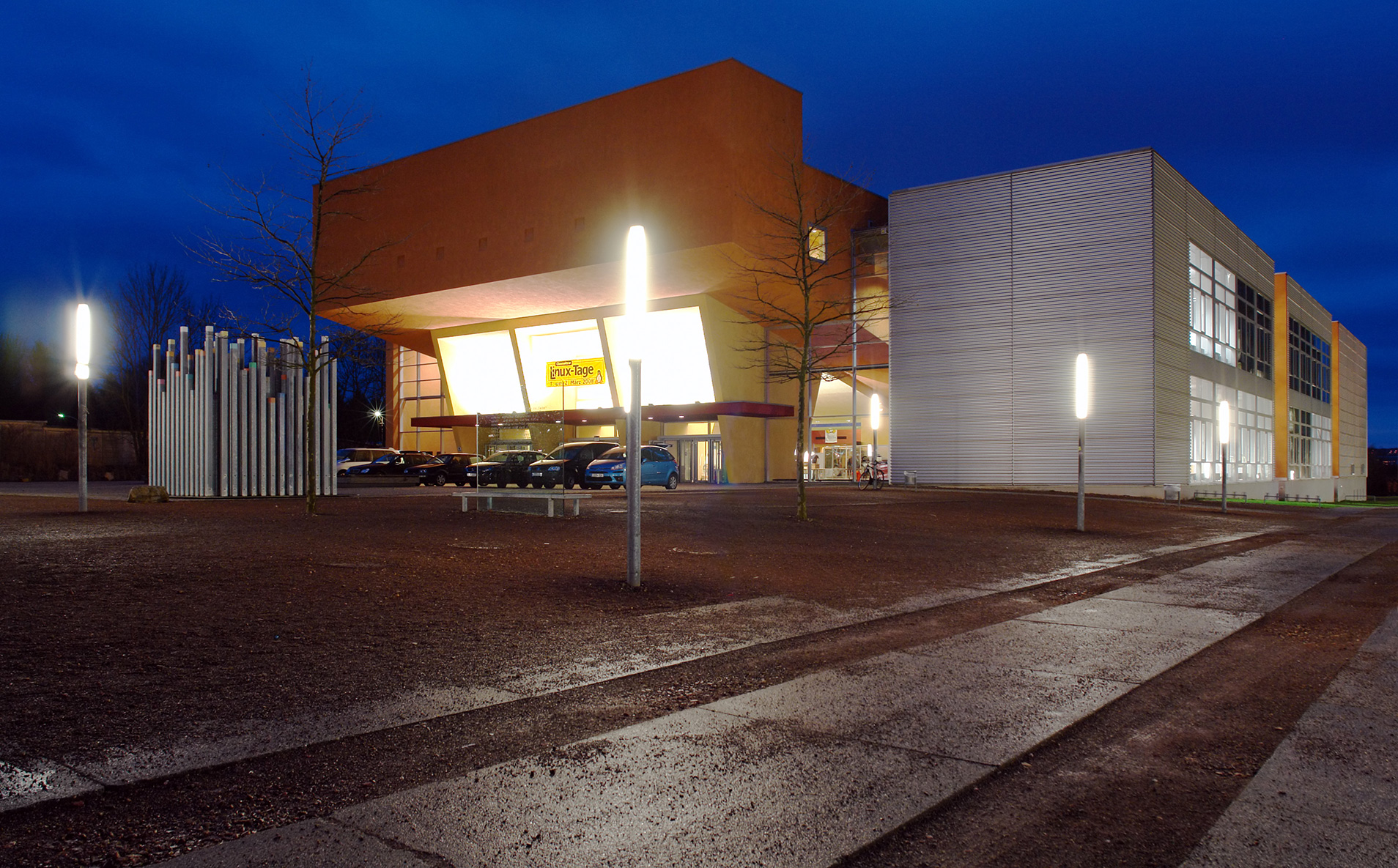
The new lecture hall, or Orangerie, at Chemnitz University of Technology

At the end of the German Democratic Republic, the academic system of Eastern Germany was absorbed by the West German system. Chemnitz University of Technology was actively supported to remain as a third university in Saxony besides University of Leipzig and TU Dresden. In 1992, the former Pädagogische Hochschule Zwickau was incorporated and the university was renamed Technische Universität Chemnitz-Zwickau. With the establishment of the Faculty of Economics and Business Administration (1993) and the Faculty of Humanities (1994), the university's profile shifted from technical to a more comprehensive university. In 1997, another renaming took place and the institution received its current name, Chemnitz University of Technology. In September of the same year, the Saxon state government made the decision to end elementary school teacher training in Chemnitz. As of the winter semester 1999/2000, no more students were enrolled in the teacher training programs. The state government made the decision to center teacher training in Leipzig and Dresden. These decisions were accompanied by massive protests from the ranks of the students but also from the Faculty of Humanities.

In 2009, when the Faculty of Behavioural and Social Sciences was spun off from the Faculty of Humanities, the university consisted of 159 professorships spread across eight faculties. With more than 9,000 students, Chemnitz University of Technology is the third largest university in Saxony after the University of Leipzig and the TU Dresden.

As part of the Excellence Initiative of the German federal and state governments, the Cluster of Excellence MERGE – Technology Fusion for Multifunctional Lightweight Structures was funded at the university until 2017. After the additional funding expired on 31 October 2019, MERGE became a central institution of the university.

Teacher education returned to the university with the establishment of the Centre for Teacher Training in 2013 as a central institution for training elementary school teachers. In 2014, the Centre for Knowledge and Technology Transfer was founded as a central institution of Chemnitz University of Technology.

Chemnitz University of Technology successfully participated in both rounds of the Female Professors Program, which is funded by the federal and state governments. In 2019, the university participated in the Female Professors Program for the third time and was the only university in Saxony to receive the "Equality Excellent" rating.

Since April 2019, the university has received funding from the program WIR! – Change through Innovation in the Region. Up to 15 million euros are available for the two joint projects – Smart Rail Connectivity-Campus and SmartERZ. The aim of the Smart Rail Connectivity-Campus is to establish a research campus in Annaberg-Buchholz for research into autonomous train traffic.

Also in 2019, Chemnitz University of Technology received the Award for University Communication for its overall communicative concept and its advocacy against violence and xenophobia following the racist riots in Chemnitz in 2018.

== Organization and Administration ==
=== Faculties ===
The university is organised into the following eight faculties:

- Faculty of Computer Science
- Faculty of Economics and Business Administration
- Faculty of Electrical Engineering and Information Technology
- Faculty of Mathematics
- Faculty of Mechanical Engineering
- Faculty of Natural Sciences
- Faculty of Humanities
- Faculty of Behavioural and Social Sciences

=== Central Institutions ===
- Cluster of Excellence MERGE
- Saxony's Centre for Teaching and Learning
- University Library
- Foreign Language Centre
- Internationales Universitätszentrum
- Centre for Young Scientists
- Centre for Knowledge and Technology Transfer
- Research Centre MAIN
- International Office
- University Computer Centre
- Centre for Teacher Training
- Centre for Sports and Health Promotion

=== An-Institutes ===
- Cetex Institute for Textile and Processing Machines gemeinnützige GmbH
- Institute of Mechatronics e.V.
- Saxony Textile Research Institute e.V.
- TUCed – An-Institut für Transfer und Weiterbildung GmbH
- Center for Criminological Research Saxony

== Campus ==
Chemnitz University of Technology's growth led it to have buildings in various parts of Chemnitz. The campus on Reichenhainer Staße is the main campus. There are currently four parts of the university:

=== Campus at Straße der Nationen 62 ===
The campus at Straße der Nationen 62 is in the center of Chemnitz across from the bus station. This includes the buildings at Straße der Nationen 62 (the Böttcher Building), Bahnhofstraße 8 (Patent Information Center), Carolastraße 8 (Department of Human Resources, Department of Budget and Economics), and the Alte Aktienspinnerei (University Library and University Archives).

==== Eduard-Theodor-Böttcher-Bau ====
The Böttcher-Bau or Böttcher Building is the main and oldest building at Chemnitz University of Technology. The natural stone facade of the building consists of granite, porphyry, and sandstone elements. The most prominent part of the historical building is the four-meter long and 21-meter high facade. Behind the main entrance doors there is a vestibule with a historical cross vault. After the staircase, the student secretariat is located to the right.

This building is home to the university administration (President and Vice-Presidents' offices, office of the chancellor, some departments), the University Computer Centre as well as the Faculty of Computer Science and the Institute of Chemistry. Furthermore, the Böttcher-Bau is home to a cafeteria and a canteen which are operated by the Studentenwerk Chemnitz-Zwickau. Also located in this building is part of the TUClab, Chemnitz University of Technology's start-up support network.

The Böttcher Building, whose cornerstone was laid on 2 September 1875, was named after Professor Eduard Theodor Böttcher (1829–1893). Böttcher was a professor of mechanics and for many years the director of the Royal Higher Industrial School in Chemnitz. The laboratory building facing the railroad station was handed over as early as 1876. The busts of Jöns Jakob Berzelius and Alexander von Humboldt in the staircase there also date from this time. On 16 October 1877, this building was consecrated as the State Technical School. Under this collective name, it united the Higher School of Trades, the School of Construction Trades, the School of Master Craftsmen and the School of Trades Marks. The building, which was equipped according to the most modern standards and in which 612 students were taught at the time, had 105 rooms with a total area of 6,613 square meters. Since the 150th anniversary of engineering education in 1986, the main building at the university has borne the name "Eduard-Theodor-Böttcher-Bau". In 1986, a sculpture of Böttcher by the Karl-Marx-Stadt artist Frank Diettrich was also unveiled in front of the Senate Hall on the second floor in the central part of the building.

On the front exterior façade of the building, three pairs of figures above the large main entrances indicate the sciences that were taught in the building at the time: Mathematics and Physics, Textile Industry and Chemical Engineering, and Mechanical and Civil Engineering.

In addition, the portrait heads of famous representatives of the sciences are in high relief in the central section. Pictured are:

- Galileo Galilei (1564–1642)
- Gottfried Wilhelm Leibniz (1646–1716)
- Jöns Jakob Berzelius (1779–1848)
- Leonhard Euler (1707–1783)
- Gaspard Monge (1746–1818)
- James Watt (1736–1819)
- Karl Karmarsch (1803–1879)

At the height of the former assembly hall windows, two 2.25-meter-tall (7.4 ft) statues can be seen on the sides of the central section. The left figure, equipped with a cogwheel and compasses, symbolizes technology. The right statue represents science – reinforced by the book and the lecturing posture. All portraits and the two statues were modeled by sculptor Anton Händler, who taught at the Chemnitz Gewerbzeichenschule.

On the roof of the building, directly above the portraits on the fourth floor, there is a parapet wall. At the time, it bore the words "Königliche Technische Lehranstalten" (Royal Technical Schools), which have since been replaced by the words "Technische Universität" (University of Technology). The picture is rounded off by two lions representing the Saxon coat of arms decorated with a golden crown.

In the inner courtyard of the Böttcher Building is the "Alte Heizhaus." This was originally a flat building, consisting of a boiler house and chimney, which was intended to provide heating and ventilation for the Böttcher Building via ducts. These ducts were up to 3.5 meters below ground, with the bottom of the chimney reaching a depth of six meters. An open staircase led to the basement of the boiler house, and to the left and right of the staircase there were openings with cast-iron lids through which the fuel was stored in the underground rooms. This facility was among the most modern of the time. Construction of the boiler house began in April 1875 and was completed with the chimney and an underground connecting duct between the chimney and the laboratory in October 1875. The building itself was constructed in 1877 by the Chemnitz architect Emil Alwin Gottschaldt. When it was connected to the municipal heating supply in 1967, the chimney was removed. A converter station was subsequently integrated into the building. In the course of further renovations from 1996 to 2000, all technical equipment was relocated to the basement area. Since then, it has also served as a station for technical equipment for the supply of heat and electricity.

==== University Library ====
Chemnitz University of Technology's University Library has been located in the Alte Aktienspinnerei building since 1 October 2020. The historic building, which is a protected landmark today, was built in the architectural style of historical eclecticism around 1858 and now houses a stock of around 1.2 million books.

The architect Friedrich Theodor Roschig designed the building entirely of iron and stone due to the fire hazard posed by wood. At the time, the building was one of the most fire-safe in the city of Chemnitz. With 60,000 spindles, it was the largest spinning mill in Saxony. At the beginning of the 20th century, the spinning mill moved out of the building because it had become too small for the amount of yarn to be produced.

During World War 2, the building was heavily damaged and lost the top floor. After the war, the building was given an emergency roof and experienced a variety of uses during the time of the GDR and after the fall of the Berlin Wall: among other things, as a department store, a puppet theater, a city library, an office building and, after the turn of the millennium, as an art gallery. After that, the building stood empty.

In 2012, a Europe-wide competition was launched to convert the Alte Aktienspinnerei. This contest included requirements to restore the building to its original form and to leave the style of an industrial building. On 31 January 2013, the jury, chaired by Paul Kahlfeldt, made the decision to place the design of the bidding consortium Lungwitz, Heine, Mildner (Dresden) and Rabe (Berlin) in first place. The justification stated: "The honest and sensitive handling of the historic building fabric and its extension is very successful. The consistent and timeless formulation is continued both in the facade and in the interior spaces. The historic building fabric is optimally used and extended. There is a clear separation of individual workplaces and group rooms. The use is rounded off by the central placement of the reading rooms."

In mid-2015, the conversion into the university library began. The relocation of the collections from the location of different parts of the campus took place in the spring and summer of 2020. Beginning in June 2020, the previous three library locations, their stacks and the university archive were combined in the Alte Aktienspinnerei building.

=== Campus on Reichenhainer Straße ===
The Reichenhainer Straße campus is located on Reichenhainer Straße in the Bernsdorf neighborhood. This campus is home to the cafeteria, student council, and Studentenwerk Chemnitz-Zwickau. In addition, the Faculty of Economics and Business Administration, parts of the Faculty of Mathematics, the Faculty of Electrical Engineering and Information Technology, the Institute of Physics, parts of the Faculty of Mechanical Engineering and parts of the Faculty of Behavioural and Social Sciences are located here.

The Central Lecture Hall, built between 1996 and 1997 at a cost of 33 million Deutschmarks, is also located here. It contains a total of 2,576 seats in 4 lecture halls and 14 seminar rooms and is commonly called the Orangerie because of its orange color. The largest lecture hall, the Auditorium Maximum, holds 714 seats.

Between 2016 and 2017, the campus square in front of the Central Lecture Hall and the Weinhold Building was renovated, and the tram tracks on Reichenhainer Straße were relocated to connect the campus to the Straße der Nationen 62 campus and several cities in the region as part of the Chemnitzer Modell project.

The Adolf-Ferdinand-Weinhold-Bau, the largest building on the Reichenhainer Straße campus in terms of usable space, is next to the Orangerie. The building was completely renovated between 2010 and 2013 at a cost of 55.25 million euros. It houses two lecture halls, 14 seminar rooms, eight language cabinets, 90 laboratories and 144 offices. In 2014, the building was awarded the Architekturpreis Beton.

All student dormitories, sports facilities, the Fraunhofer Institute for Machine Tools and Forming Technology (IWU), and the Fraunhofer Institute for Electronic Nano Systems (ENAS) are also located in the immediate vicinity.

==== Central Lecture Hall and Seminar Building ====
A distinctive building on the Reichenhainer Straße campus is the Central Lecture Hall and Seminar Building, which is commonly called the "Orangerie" by students, mainly because of its exterior painting. The building, designed by Meinhard von Gerkan, was built between 1996 and 1998 at a cost of 33 million German marks. The client was the Chemnitz State Property and Building Authority . It offers a total of 2,576 seats in four lecture halls and 14 seminar rooms. The largest lecture hall, the "Auditorium Maximum," holds 706 seats. The Audimax is supported by four wall panels facing Reichenhainer Straße. The total volume of the building is 51,766 m³. The floor area is 8,856 m^{2}.

A two-story foyer forms the center of the building, which contains the entrance to the four lecture halls. The foyer is enclosed on two levels by an angular structure in which the seminar rooms are located. The east and west sides of the foyer are completely glazed and open onto Reichenhainer Straße. A steel truss structure and metal roof were installed over the two lecture halls. The other rooms are covered by concrete ceilings, some of which are greened. In addition, expanded metal was used for the ceilings, corrugated sheet metal on the facade, and steel escape staircases located outdoors between the halls.

The facade of the Orangerie consists of an ensemble of colored plaster, corrugated aluminum panels and glass. Colored concrete, parquet, tiles and linoleum make up the floor coverings. The walls in the interior are in red, sienna, and yellow as well as blue tones and create the building's unique atmosphere. Niches within the building have also been set off in color. This is intended to create an expanded spatial experience.

The foyer is expansive and a central meeting place. It is also home to numerous seating areas, recreational facilities, as well as the Chemnitz University of Technology's Unishop and a snack bar operated by the Studentenwerk Chemnitz-Zwickau. The foyer is also an event space, which is used for example for career fairs or external events such as the Chemnitzer Linuxtage and other meetings. The Audimax also hosts the traditional Christmas Lecture as well as the Children's University Chemnitz and the Senior Citizens' College.

In front of the Central Lecture Hall and Seminar Building is a group of columns. It consists of 187 stelae made of fully galvanized steel tubing on a base area of 16 square meters. Each of the upper crests is given a color of one of the systems of this color scale commonly used in the printing industry. The length of the columns is related to the brightness value of each color. The columns symbolize 187 basic colors of the so-called RAL color scale. The sculpture was created by Stefan Nestler from Dresden.

Between 2016 and 2017, the campus square in front of the Central Lecture Hall and Seminar Building and the Weinhold Building was renovated and the tram tracks on Reichenhainer Straße were laid to connect the campus to the "Chemnitz Model," which is an infrastructure plan that connects the campus with the campus on Straße der Nationen 62 and several cities in the region. On 8 December 2028, the new campus square was ceremonially opened. The campus square between the Central Lecture Hall and Seminar Building, the Weinhold Building, and the cafeteria is also a popular meeting place and event venue.

==== Cluster of Excellence MERGE ====
The MERGE Research Centre "Lightweight Technologies" is located in the immediate vicinity of the Central Lecture Hall Building and the Weinhold Building at Chemnitz University of Technology on Reichenhainer Straße. In a building totalling 4,640 square meters, novel energy- and resource-saving materials and production processes are developed and analyzed. Areas of application for the materials and manufacturing technologies include the mobility sector and the aerospace industry. The university has thus become an internationally important center for lightweight construction research.

The research center was built under the project management of the Chemnitz branch of the Saxon Real Estate and Construction Management with the participation of numerous Saxon companies. The total construction costs were around 27 million euros, financed by funds from the European Regional Development Fund for improving the infrastructure at universities for research with an application-oriented focus, as well as by tax revenues based on the budget passed by the Saxon state parliament.

In the three-part hall structure of the technology center created in the first construction phase, Hall A provides space for numerous test and research lines, including compounding and extrusion technology as well as injection molding machines and an orbital winding system, whose processes and plant technology were developed and patented at the cluster.

The 14-meter-high Hall B houses the heart of the research cluster, the so-called MERGE machine. This manufacturing complex combines the processing of plastic- and metal-based materials using the basic technologies of forming and injection molding. It includes a prototyping facility for the production of components, such as those made for the automotive industry, and is supplemented by a press. The two-story Hall C has a central hall area with a clear ceiling height of around ten meters. Attached to this are the meeting rooms on the first floor and the ventilation center, test and research rooms on the upper floor.

The hall complex of the technology center, where research has been carried out since August 2015, was expanded with a state-of-the-art laboratory in October 2020. The Free State of Saxony invested around 14.5 million euros in this project, with the largest part coming from the European Regional Development Fund. In addition to highly specialized laboratory rooms, this second construction phase also offers office, practical, and meeting rooms, among other things. The new building directly adjoins the south facade of the Technology Center. The two buildings are connected on the first floor and second floor. These floors house the laboratories, where fundamental issues in lightweight construction research along the value chain from the molecule to the complex component are now clarified and subsequently tested in terms of production technology in the adjacent Technology Center. In addition, the laboratory building offers space for research and development technologies, including additive manufacturing, as well as state-of-the-art equipment in the field of testing technology.

==== Research Center MAIN ====
The Center for Materials, Architectures and Integration of Nanomembranes (MAIN) is dedicated to exploring the fundamental physical and chemical properties of flexible nanomembranes. This includes unlocking the engineering application potential of this class of materials. Nanomembranes are a novel class of materials and one of the most advanced fields in materials science.

The MAIN research center fits into the core competency of Materials and Intelligent Systems at Chemnitz University of Technology and builds a bridge between basic and applied research, such as in the connection of sensors and actuators in the field of microrobotics. For example, researchers at the MAIN 2020 research center, together with scientists at the Leibniz Institute for Solid State and Materials Research Dresden (IFW) led by Oliver G. Schmidt, succeeded in constructing the smallest microelectronic robot. The construction is also in the Guinness World Records as the smallest microelectronic robot.

MAIN was built between 2011 and 2018 as a research building in accordance with Article 91b, Section 1, No. 3 of the German Basic Law and was co-financed with approximately 34.3 million euros from federal and state funds. On 13 August 2018, the new building was handed over to Chemnitz University of Technology. The construction of the research building was funded as part of a successful application by the university to the German Council of Science and Humanities and since the handover has offered 120 scientists state-of-the-art research and working conditions.

The Chemnitz branch of the Sächsisches Immobilien- und Baumanagement state enterprise was responsible for the construction, based on the winning design by the architects Heinle, Wischer und Partner from Dresden. The research building with about 3,800 square meters of usable floor space was designed as a solid reinforced concrete skeleton structure with load-bearing wall panels and ceilings to enable vibration-free measurements. As vibration protection for the sensitive laboratory equipment, the complex rests on a reinforced concrete floor slab around 1.60 meters thick.

A functional highlight are the clean rooms, which allow electronic components to be manufactured in a dust-free environment. Two "knowledge gardens" were also created in the building as places for meeting and exchanging ideas, supporting the idea of connecting research areas across floors. These areas were designed by Dresden artist Patricia Westerholz, who won the Kunst am Bau competition with her work "layers and structures." The architectural and functional features of this research building were recognized at the 2020 Industrial Building Awards, which were presented on 24 June 2020, and received a commendation from the jury. The building's design was also recognized by the jury.

In August 2020, the President's Office at Chemnitz University of Technology, in consultation with the Task Force for Implementation and the faculties involved, decided on the basis of the university development planning and in consultation with the Senate and the University Council to run MAIN as the Central Scientific Institution of Chemnitz University of Technology.

=== Campus on Erfenschlager Straße ===
The campus on Erfenschlager Straße houses part of the Faculty of Mechanical Engineering, the project house METEOR, and the student racing team (T.U.C. Racing e.V.)

=== Campus on Wilhelm-Raabe-Straße ===
The campus on Wilhelm-Raabe-Straße accommodates most of the Faculty of Behavioural and Social Sciences (Institute of Psychology).

== Academic profile ==
In winter term 2013/2014 about 2,500 young people started their bachelor's or master's degree studies at TU Chemnitz. All in all, the university offers 35 bachelor's and 50 master's degree programs. On the international level TU Chemnitz cooperates with 126 partner institutions in 39 countries. This includes 19 members of the international university network Academic Consortium for the 21st Century (AC21). TU Chemnitz is supported by the Federal Ministry of Education and Research within the project 'Teaching Quality Pact' as well as by Saxony's Centre for Teaching and Learning funded by the Saxon State Ministry of Science and the Arts.

=== Research ===
The university has concentrated its research to six main profiles:

- New materials
- Production Life Cycle
- Microelectronics & Micro-electromechanical systems
- Applications & development of systems
- Communications, Media, Technology
- Modeling, Simulation, High Performance Computing

A key research area 'Energy-efficient Production Processes' stands the Federal Cluster of Excellence 'Merge Technologies for Multifunctional Lightweight Structures' (MERGE). Funded with €34 million, this cluster is the only one in Germany focusing on the field of lightweight engineering. The breeding ground for this cluster was prepared by the Saxon State Cluster of Excellence 'Energy-efficient Product and Process Innovations in Production Engineering' (eniPROD), which was jointly established with the Fraunhofer Institute for Machine Tools and Forming Technology. These initiatives are complemented by additional collaborative research areas funded by Deutsche Forschungsgemeinschaft (DFG) which develop intelligent materials and energy-efficient production technologies.

Within the key research area 'Smart Systems and Materials', scientists at TU Chemnitz are also involved in the Federal Cluster of Excellence 'Center for Advancing Electronics Dresden' (cfAED). Further input is provided by the Nano System Integration Network of Excellence (Nanett), funded by the Federal Government, as well as by the cluster COOL SILICON 'Energy Efficiency Innovations from Silicon Saxony'. Several DFG Research Groups are working in this field. In addition, TU Chemnitz will be the home of the 'Center for Materials, Architectures and Integration of Nanomembranes' (MAIN).

=== International students ===
Chemnitz University of Technology has a large body of foreign students. In winter semester 2017, out of its 10,482 students, 2,712 were foreign students, which equals to about 25%.

==== Rankings ====
Worldwide, TU Chemnitz is ranked 1176 by CWUR in 2022.

== Notable people ==
=== Professors ===
- Werner Dilger (died 2007), German computer scientist
- Josef Lutz, German physicist and electrical engineer
- Gopakumar Thiruvancheril, Indian assistant professor of molecular electronics
- Heiner Rindermann, German intelligence and educational researcher
- Peter Benner, German mathematician
- Nam-Trung Nguyen, Vietnamese-Australian researcher in microfluidics, professor and recipient of Australian Laureate Fellowship
