= Scary Creatures =

Studio album by Brainstorm
- Released: 15 January 2016
- Recorded: August-October 2015
- Studios: u3multimedia Studios; Storm Your Brain Studios
- Genres: Heavy metal, power metal
- Length: 50:00
- Label: AFM
- Producer: Achim Köhler

Brainstorm chronology
Firesoul (2014)	Scary Creatures (2016)	Midnight Ghost (2018)

Professional ratings
Review scores
Source	Rating
Metal Express Radio	6/10
Metal.de	7/10
Powermetal.de	9.5/10
Rock Hard	7/10
Zephyr's Odem	9/10

Scary Creatures is the eleventh studio album by German heavy metal band Brainstorm, released on 15 January 2016.

== Track listing ==
1. "The World to See" - 5:12
2. "How Much Can You Take" - 4:15
3. "We Are..." - 5:30
4. "Where Angels Dream" - 4:40
5. "Scary Creatures" - 5:49
6. "Twisted Ways" - 5:25
7. "Caressed by the Blackness" - 4:31
8. "Scars in Your Eyes" - 4:27
9. "Take Me to the Never" - 5:07
10. "Sky Among the Clouds" - 5:04
11. "Lift Your Eyes to See" - 4:11 (bonus track on digipack edition)

== Personnel ==
- Andy B. Franck – vocals
- Torsten Ihlenfeld – guitars, backing vocals
- Milan Loncaric – guitars, backing vocals
- Antonio Ieva – bass
- Dieter Bernert – drums
