= Memorial Roots =

Studio album by Brainstorm
- Released: 16 October 2009
- Recorded: May–August 2009
- Studio: Storm Your Brain Studios, Gerstetten, Gate Studios, Wolfsburg, Germany
- Genre: Heavy metal, power metal
- Length: 54:44
- Label: AFM
- Producer: Brainstorm, Sascha Paeth & Miro

Brainstorm chronology
| Downburst (2008) | Memorial Roots (2009) | On the Spur of the Moment (2011) |

Professional ratings
Review scores
| Source | Rating |
|---|---|
| AllMusic | 3.5/5 stars |
| Metal.de | 7/10 stars |
| Powermetal.de | 8/10 stars |
| Rock Hard | 8/10 stars |

Memorial Roots is the eighth studio album by the German power metal band Brainstorm, released on 16 October 2009. A remastered edition titled Memorial Roots (Re-Rooted) was released on 16 September 2016.

== Track listing ==
All songs written and arranged by Brainstorm, all lyrics by Andy B. Franck.

1. "Forsake What I Believed" - 6:31
2. "Shiver" - 3:17
3. "The Conjunction of 7 Planets" - 6:34
4. "Cross the Line" - 5:01
5. "Nailed Down Dreams" - 5:37
6. "Blood Still Stains" - 4:10
7. "Ahimsa" - 4:21
8. "The Final Stages of Decay" - 6:27
9. "Victim" - 4:16
10. "When No One Cares" - 3:19
11. "Would You" - 5:11

European limited edition bonus tracks

12. "Seems to Be Perfect" - 4:22
13. "Too Late to Deny" - 4:33

Re-Rooted edition bonus tracks

14. "Nothing" - 4:02
15. "Honesty" - 4:17

== Personnel ==
Band members

- Andy B. Franck - lead and backing vocals
- Torsten Ihlenfeld - guitars, backing vocals
- Milan Loncaric - guitars, backing vocals
- Antonio Ieva - bass
- Dieter Bernert - drums

Additional musicians

- Michael 'Miro' Rodenberg - keyboards, producer, engineer, mastering

Production

- Sascha Paeth - producer, engineer, mixing
- Simon Oberender - engineer
