= Downburst (album) =

Studio album by Brainstorm
- Released: 25 January 2008
- Recorded: Gate Studios, Wolfsburg, Germany, June–July 2007
- Genre: Heavy metal, power metal
- Length: 43:22 (Original release) 49:15 (European limited edition)
- Label: Metal Blade
- Producer: Sascha Paeth, Miro, Brainstorm

Brainstorm chronology
Liquid Monster (2005)	Downburst (2008)	Memorial Roots (2009)

Professional ratings
Review scores
Source	Rating
AllMusic	3.5/5 stars
Cosmos Gaming	(mixed)
Metal.de	8/10 stars
Metal Forces	6.5/10 stars
Rock Hard	9/10 stars
Powermetal.de	

Downburst is the seventh studio album by the German metal band Brainstorm, released on 25 January 2008. Former bassist Andreas Mailänder left the band before recordings started, so bass was handled by Torsten and Milan on this album. "Fire Walk with Me" was released as a single.

== Track listing ==
All songs written and arranged by Brainstorm.

1. "Falling Spiral Down" – 4:34
2. "Fire Walk with Me" – 4:24
3. "Stained with Sin" – 3:38
4. "Redemption in Your Eyes" – 4:26
5. "End in Sorrow" – 4:48
6. "How Do You Feel" – 3:49
7. "Protect Me from Myself" – 4:42
8. "Surrounding Walls" – 4:10
9. "Frozen" – 4:37
10. "All Alone" – 4:14

The European limited edition of the album also includes

1. "Crawling in Chains" - 3:47
2. "Hold Tight" - 4:06

The Japanese edition has three bonus tracks

1. "Crawling in Chains" - 3:44
2. "Drowning" - 4:32
3. "Fire Walk with Me (Firestarter Mix)" - 4:46

== Personnel ==
Band members

- Andy B. Franck - lead and backing vocals
- Torsten Ihlenfeld - guitars, bass, backing vocals
- Milan Loncaric - guitars, bass, backing vocals
- Dieter Bernert - drums

Additional musicians

- Michael 'Miro' Rodenberg - keyboards, producer, engineer, mastering

Production

- Sascha Paeth - producer, engineer, mixing
- Simon Oberender, Olaf Reitmeier - engineers
