= Hungry (Brainstorm album) =

Studio album by Brainstorm
- Released: 14 April 1997
- Recorded: November 1996 - January 1997
- Studios: Wasteworld Studios, Heidenheim, Germany
- Genres: Power metal, heavy metal
- Length: 49:20
- Label: B.O. Records
- Producer: Brainstorm

Brainstorm chronology
Hungry (1997)	Unholy (1998)

Professional ratings
Review scores
Source	Rating
Rock Hard	7/10

Hungry is the debut album by German power metal band Brainstorm, released in 1997. On March 23, 2007, this album and Unholy were remastered by Achim Köhler and re-released by Metal Blade with six bonus tracks and a revised cover.

== Track listing ==
All music and lyrics by Brainstorm

1. "Nails in My Hands" - 3:11
2. "King of Fools" - 3:52
3. "Innocent Until Caught" - 4:58
4. "The Other Side" - 6:53
5. "Tomorrow Never Comes" - 3:29
6. "Liar's Edge" - 4:53
7. "Tell-tale Heart" - 3:44
8. "Welcome to the Darkside" - 5:10
9. "Bring You Down" - 4:20
10. "Deep Down into Passion" - 4:36
11. "Mr. Know-it-all" - 4:14

=== Remastered CD edition bonus tracks (The 5th Season demo) ===
12. "Liar's Edge" (demo) - 4:55
13. "Live in Shame" - 4:22
14. "Kamikaze" - 5:43
15. "Up from the Ashes" - 3:15
16. "Blind" - 4:22
17. "Reach for the Sky" - 5:07

== Personnel ==
=== Band members ===
- Marcus Jürgens - vocals
- Torsten Ihlenfeld - guitars, keyboards
- Milan Loncaric - guitars
- Andreas Mailänder - bass
- Dieter Bernert - drums

=== Additional musicians ===
- Ralf Scheepers, Lee Tarot - vocals on "Mr. Know-it-all"
- Michael Rodenberg - keyboards on remastered edition

=== Production ===
- Peter Waschelewski - engineer, mixing
- Michael Becker - mastering
- Achim Köhler - re-mastering
