= Gopakumar Thiruvancheril =

Indian engineer

Gopakumar Thiruvancheril is an Indian Professor of molecular electronics from Indian Institutes of Technology. He is an author of certain peer-reviewed articles two of which, as of 2013, were cited over 60 times and appeared in such journals Journal of Physical Chemistry B and C, including others. He completed his Ph.D. in physics at TU Chemnitz.

== Selected publications ==
- TG Gopakumar, M Lackinger, M Hackert; F Müller; M Hietschold (2004). "Adsorption of palladium phthalocyanine on graphite STM and LEED study". Journal of Physical Chemistry B. 108 (23): 7839–7843. doi:10.1021/jp037751i.
- M Lackinger, T Müller, TG Gopakumar, F Müller; M Hietschold; GW Flynn (2004). "Tunneling voltage polarity dependent submolecular contrast of naphthalocyanine on graphite. A STM study of close-packed monolayers under ultrahigh-vacuum conditions". Journal of Physical Chemistry B. 108 (7): 2279–2284. doi:10.1021/jp036698v.
- TG Gopakumar, F Matino, H Naggert; A Bannwarth; F Tuczek; R Berndt (2012). "Electron‐Induced Spin Crossover of Single Molecules in a Bilayer on Gold". 51 (25). Angewandte Chemie International Edition: 6262–6266.
- M Hietschold, M Lackinger, S Griessl, WM Heckl; TG Gopakumar; GW Flynn (2005). "Molecular structures on crystalline metallic surfaces–From STM images to molecular electronics". 82 (3). Microelectronic Engineering: 207–214.
- NK Chaki, M Aslam, TG Gopakumar; J Sharma; R Pasricha; IS Mulla; K Vijayamohanan (2003). "Effect of chain length and the nature of the monolayer on the electrical behavior of hydrophobically organized gold clusters". Journal of Physical Chemistry B. 107 (49): 13567–13574. doi:10.1021/jp035032y.
- TG Gopakumar; F Müller; M Hietschold (2006). "Scanning tunneling microscopy and scanning tunneling spectroscopy studies of planar and nonplanar naphthalocyanines on graphite (0001). Part 1: Effect of nonplanarity on the adlayer structure and voltage-induced flipping of nonplanar tin-naphthalocyanine". Journal of Physical Chemistry B. 110 (12): 6051–6059. doi:10.1021/jp055533e. PMID 16553416.
- NTN Ha, TG Gopakumar; R Gutzler; M Lackinger; H Tang; M Hietschold (2010). "Influence of Solvophobic Effects on Self-Assembly of Trimesic Acid at the Liquid− Solid Interface". 114 (8). Journal of Physical Chemistry C: 3531–3536.
- TG Gopakumar, T Brumme, J Kroger; C Toher; G Cuniberti; R Berndt (2011). "Coverage-Driven Electronic Decoupling of Fe-Phthalocyanine from a Ag (111) Substrate". 115 (24). Journal of Physical Chemistry C: 12173–12179.
- M Toader; TG Gopakumar; M Abdel-Hafiez; M Hietschold (2010). "Exploring the F16CoPc/Ag (110) Interface Using Scanning Tunneling Microscopy and Spectroscopy. Part 1: Template-Guided Adlayer Structure Formation". 114 (8)). Journal of Physical Chemistry C: 3537–3543.
- NK Chaki, TG Gopakumar, T Maddanimath; M Aslam; K Vijayamohanan (2003). "Effect of chain length on the tunneling conductance of gold quantum dots at room temperature". 94 (5). Journal of Applied Physics: 3663–3665.
- M Toader; TG Gopakumar; P Shukrynau; M Hietschold (2010). "Exploring the F16CoPc/Ag (110) interface using scanning tunneling microscopy and spectroscopy. 2. Adsorption-induced charge transfer effect". 114 (49). Journal of Physical Chemistry C: 21548–21554.
- TG Gopakumar; F Müller; M Hietschold (2006). "Scanning Tunneling Microscopy and Scanning Tunneling Spectroscopy Studies of Planar and Nonplanar Naphthalocyanine on Graphite (0001). Part 2: Tip-Sample Distance-Dependent I-V Spectroscopy". Journal of Physical Chemistry B. 110 (12): 6060–6065. doi:10.1021/jp055535z. PMID 16553417.
- TG Gopakumar, T Davran‐Candan, J Bahrenburg; RJ Maurer; F Temps; K Reuter (2013). "Broken Symmetry of an Adsorbed Molecular Switch Determined by Scanning Tunneling Spectroscopy". Angewandte Chemie. 52 (42). Angewandte Chemie International Edition: 11007–11010. Bibcode:2013AngCh.12511213G. doi:10.1002/ange.201305027.
- N Hauptmann, K Scheil, TG Gopakumar; FL Otte; C Schuett; R Herges; R Berndt (2013). "Surface Control of Alkyl Chain Conformations and Chiral Amplification in 2D". Journal of the American Chemical Society.
- TG Gopakumar, F Matino, H Naggert; A Bannwarth; F Tuczek; R Berndt (2013). "Berichtigung: Elektroneninduzierter Spin‐Crossover von Einzelmolekülen in einer Doppellage auf Gold". Angewandte Chemie. 125 (14): 3884. Bibcode:2013AngCh.125.3884G. doi:10.1002/ange.201301569.
- TG Gopakumar; H Tang; J Morillo; R Berndt (2012). "Transfer of Cl ligands between adsorbed iron tetraphenylporphyrin molecules". 134 (29). Journal of the American Chemical Society: 11844–11847.
- NK Chaki, TG Gopakumar, T Maddanimath; M Aslam; K Vijayamohanan. "Erratum:"Effect of chain length on the tunneling conductance of gold quantum dots at room temperature". 94. Journal of Applied Physics: 7379.
