= On the Spur of the Moment (Brainstorm album) =

Studio album by Brainstorm
- Released: 30 September 2011
- Recorded: March–June 2011
- Studios: Light and Sound Studio, Ludwigsburg, Germany
- Genres: Heavy metal, power metal
- Length: 45:33
- Label: AFM
- Producers: Brainstorm and Axel Heckert

Brainstorm chronology
Memorial Roots (2009)	On the Spur of the Moment (2011)	Firesoul (2014)

Professional ratings
Review scores
Source	Rating
AllMusic	3.5/5 stars
Metal Express Radio	8/10
Powermetal.de	9.5/10
Rock Hard	8/10

On the Spur of the Moment is the ninth studio album by German heavy metal band Brainstorm, released on 30 September 2011.

== Track listing ==
1. "Below the Line" - 6:40
2. "In the Blink of an Eye" - 4:31
3. "Temple of Stone" - 3:26
4. "In These Walls" - 5:21
5. "Still Insane" - 3:50
6. "Dark Life" - 4:10
7. "No Saint - No Sinner" - 5:29
8. "Where Your Actions Lead You to Live" - 3:30
9. "A Life on Hold" - 3:08
10. "My Own Hell" - 5:31
11. "This Pain Is Mine" (bonus track on digipak edition) - 3:58
12. "The Heartless Spawn of Seed" (bonus track on digipak edition) - 4:41

== Personnel ==
- Andy B. Franck – vocals
- Torsten Ihlenfeld – guitars, backing vocals
- Milan Loncaric – guitars, backing vocals
- Antonio Ieva – bass
- Dieter Bernert – drums
