= Semikron =

German semiconductor company

Semikron International GmbH
- Type: GmbH
- Founded: 1951
- Headquarters: Nuremberg, Germany
- Key people: Markus Menne, Johannes Krapp
- Products: Semiconductor
- Revenue: €452,900,000 (2020)
- Number of employees: 4,000 (2020)
- Website: www.semikron-danfoss.com

Semikron is a German-based manufacturer of power semiconductor components. The company was founded in 1951 by Dr. Friedrich Josef Martin in Nuremberg. In 2019, the company had a staff of more than 3,000 people in 24 subsidiaries (world-wide) with production sites in Germany, Brazil, China, France, India, Italy, Slovakia, and the USA.

Semikron holds a 30% share of the worldwide market of diode/thyristor modules.

== Products ==
Semikron's product range consists of 11,600 different power semiconductors from 1 kW to 10 MW, including chips, discrete diodes/thyristors, power modules (IGBT/MOSFET/diode / thyristor/CIB/IPM), driver and protection components and integrated subsystems.

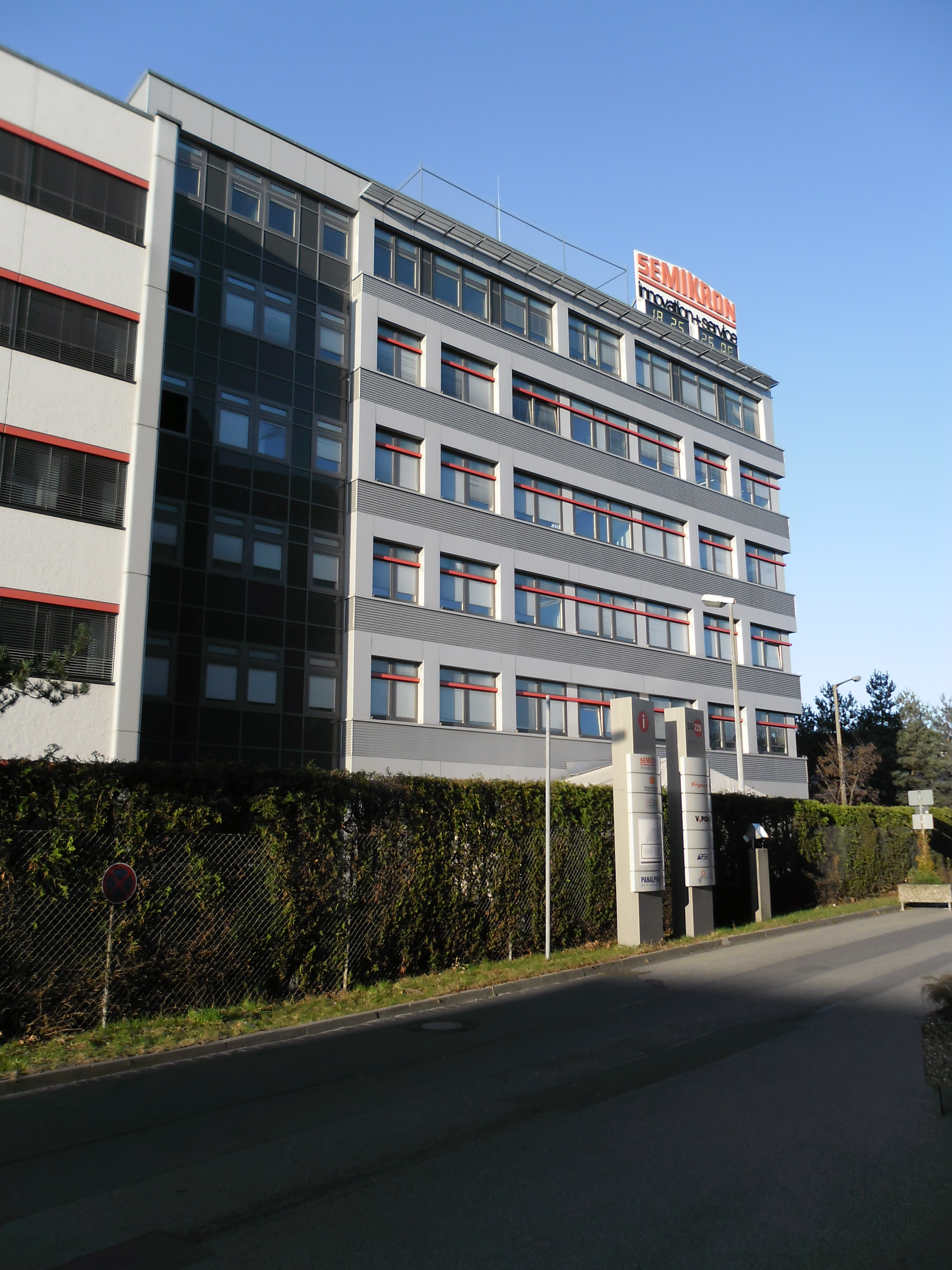
SEMIKRON Elektronik GmbH Sigmundstraße 200 Nürnberg

Notable developments include:

- 2010 SKAI 3 phase converter system up to 250 kVA
- 2009 SKiiP4 intelligent power module with 3600 A; for use in wind and traction applications
- 2008 MiniSKiiP IPM first intelligent power module for solder-free assembly
- 2008 SKYPER with fully digital signal processing
- 2007 SKiM 100% solder-free IGBT modules for hybrid vehicles
- 2007 Sinter Technology – reliable sintering replaces solder process
- 2006 SEMiSTART for soft-start devices
- 2005 SEMiX rectifiers with solder-free spring contacts for electrical connections
- 2004 SKYPER IGBT driver family
- 2003 SEMiX first flat IGBT half-bridge family from 250 to 900 A with solder-free spring contacts for electrical connections
- 2002 MiniSKiiPII 2nd generation of Converter-Inverter-Brake modules up to 30 kW
- 2001 Integrated converters for hybrid electric drives
- 2000 Low-power rectifiers: standard, fast and superfast axial diodes, Schottky diodes, Zener diodes, press-fit diodes, low-level rectifier bridges and SMDs
- 1999 SKiM 6-Pack IGBT modules with driver electronics
- 1998 SEMITOP rectifier circuits with solder pins for PCB assembly
- 1996 MiniSKiiP first integrated IGBT rectifier circuits in solder-free spring contact technology
- 1996 Spring Technology – spring contacts allow for solder-free electrical connections
- 1995 ASICs optimise the electronic assemblies used to control MOSFET and IGBT modules
- 1992 Fast, soft freewheeling diode with widely acclaimed properties (CAL-Diode)
- 1992 SKiiP, the first IPMs (Intelligent Power Modules) with integrated driver and SKiiP pressure contact technology 100-1200 A / 600-1200 V for high-power applications
- 1992 SKiiP Technology – pressure contact technology, no soldered copper base plate, fewer solder layers, extended service life
- 1987 SEMITRANS MOSFET modules for electric vehicles, high-frequency generators, inductive heating and lasers
- 1984 Bi-polar Darlington transistor modules SEMITRANS
- 1981 SEMIPACK modules with fast thyristors and diodes. Introduction of glass passivation and square chips
- 1976 Disc-type thyristors for DC drives and AC converters
- 1975 SEMIPACK, the world's first isolated thyristor/diode module, now an industrial standard in its 6th generation. Today, SEMIKRON is global market leader for diode/thyristor modules
- 1967 The first thyristors for variable-speed DC drives, 3-phase soft-start devices and 3-phase AC power controllers
- 1964 The world's first 1A plastic diode for direct PCB assembly for use in radios and TV sets
- 1963 The first encapsulated bridge rectifier, a revolutionary plastic bridge that established itself across the entire electronics industry
- 1961 Development of the first avalanche rectifier diode in the world
- 1959 First silicon diode made of silicon wafers. At this time, the power range of 2.5 – 300 A was an astonishingly high value
- 1954 Start of Semikron semiconductor manufacturing: selenium rectifier plates and selenium surge voltage protective devices

== Literature ==
- Application Manual Power Semiconductors
