= Gerstetten =

- Municipality
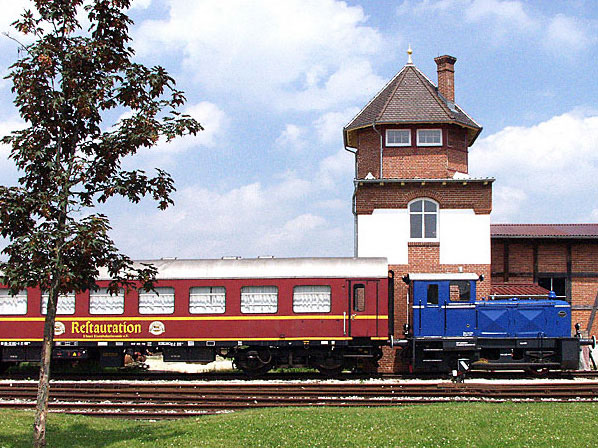
- Railway station

- Coat of arms

- Location of Gerstetten within Heidenheim district
- Interactive map of Gerstetten
- Location within Germany Location within Baden-Württemberg
- Coordinates: 48°37′21″N 10°1′14″E
- Country: Germany
- State: Baden-Württemberg
- Admin. region: Stuttgart
- District: Heidenheim

Government
  - Mayor (2018–26): Roland Polaschek

Area
  - Total: 92.43 km^{2} (35.69 sq mi)
- Elevation: 624 m (2,047 ft)

Population (2025-12-31)
  - Total: 11,530
  - Density: 124.7/km^{2} (323.1/sq mi)
- Time zone: UTC+01:00 (CET)
  - Summer (DST): UTC+02:00 (CEST)
- Postal codes: 89547
- Dialling codes: 07323, 07324 Dettingen/Heuchlingen
- Vehicle registration: HDH
- Website: www.gerstetten.de

Gerstetten (German pronunciation: [ˈɡɛʁʃtɛtn̩]) is a municipality in the district of Heidenheim in Baden-Württemberg in southern Germany.

It consists of the following villages:

Name	Population	Incorporated
Gerstetten	7,534	
Dettingen	2,042	1972
Gussenstadt	1,533	1971
Heldenfingen	1,052	1971
Heuchlingen	924	1974
Heuchstetten	137	
Sontbergen	56	1974

The total population of the municipality is 11,551 (as of December 2022).

== Politics ==
The current mayor is Matthias Heisler.

== Twin towns ==
Gerstetten has two twin towns: Cébazat, a small town near Clermont-Ferrand in France and Pilisvörösvár (German: Werischwar) in Hungary, about 20 km from Budapest.

- Cébazat (near Clermont-Ferrand), France (Auvergne) since June 27, 1992
- Pilisvörösvár, Hungary since May 5, 1996

== Notable people ==
- 1578 Andreas Josua Ulsheimer, † ???, born in Gerstetten, doctor and world traveller
- 1831, 3. August, Christian Fink, † 4. September 1911 in Esslingen, born in Dettingen, musician, composer and pedagogue
- 1841, 10. March, Friedrich Fink, † 19. December 1896 in Stuttgart, born in Dettingen am Albuch, musician, composer
- 1896, 16. July, Gottlob Berger, † 5. January 1975 in Stuttgart, war criminal, SS-Obergruppenführer and Waffen-SS general
- 1906, 1. March, Heinrich Roth, † 7. July 1983 in Göttingen, psychologist
- 1931, 23. August, Günther Steeb, economist, member of Landtag
- 1933, 11. June, Walther Zügel, banker
- 1940, 21. July, Heide Gerstenberger, politics and economy scientist
- 1965, Johannes Zimmermann, theologian, professor in Greifswald
- 1971, Birgite Gebhardt, singer and music-cabaret-artist
