= Winterbach, Baden-Württemberg =

Winterbach
- Municipality
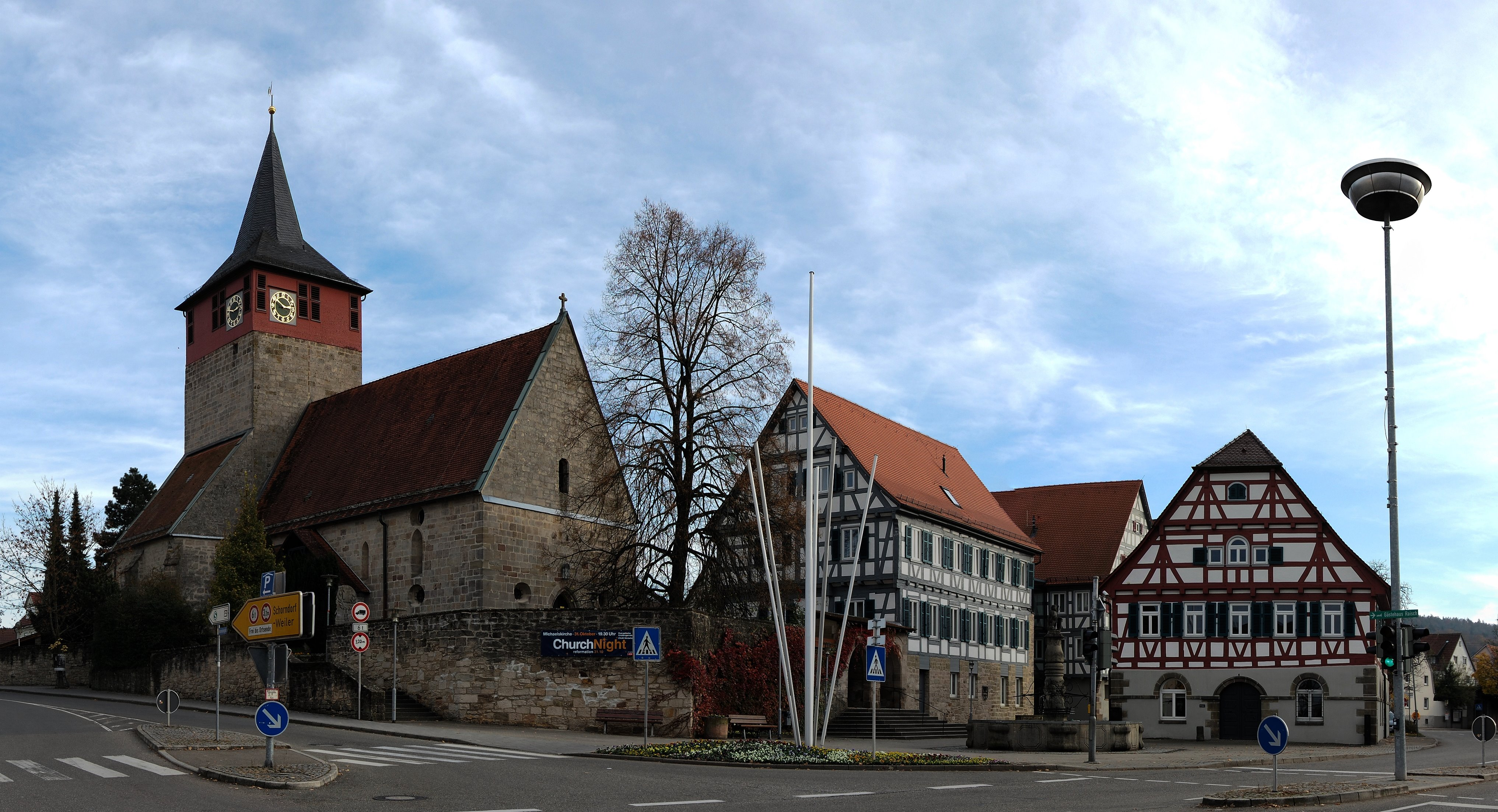
- Center of Winterbach, left side: Church of St. Michael; right side: old and new town hall (half-timbered)

- Coat of arms

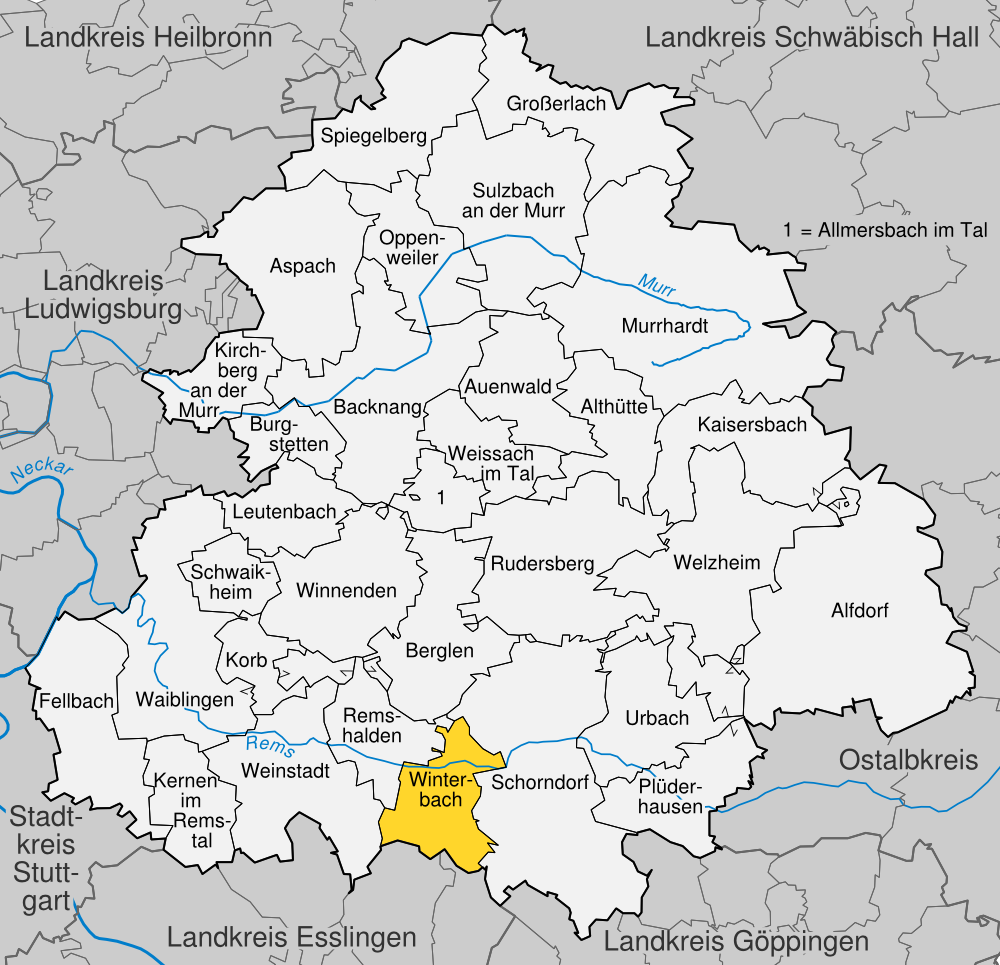
- Location of Winterbach within Rems-Murr-Kreis district
- Interactive map of Winterbach
- Location within Germany Location within Baden-Württemberg
- Coordinates: 48°47′57″N 09°28′48″E
- Country: Germany
- State: Baden-Württemberg
- Admin. region: Stuttgart
- District: Rems-Murr-Kreis

Government
  - Mayor (2016–24): Sven Müller

Area
  - Total: 17.12 km^{2} (6.61 sq mi)
- Elevation: 258 m (846 ft)

Population (2025-12-31)
  - Total: 7,567
  - Density: 442.0/km^{2} (1,145/sq mi)
- Time zone: UTC+01:00 (CET)
  - Summer (DST): UTC+02:00 (CEST)
- Postal codes: 73650
- Dialling codes: 07181
- Vehicle registration: WN
- Website: www.winterbach.de

Winterbach (German pronunciation: [ˈvɪntɐbax]) is a municipality in the district of Rems-Murr in Baden-Württemberg in Germany.

== Sons and daughters of the town ==
- Werner Dilger (1942–2007), professor of computer science, Professor of Artificial Intelligence at the TU Chemnitz
- Ingo J. Biermann (born 1978), director, filmmaker and producer, grew up In Winterbach from 1981 to 2000

=== Personalities who have worked locally ===
- Giovane Élber (born 1972), former Brazil national football team, lived in Winterbach in the 1990s, when he played for VfB Stuttgart
- Davie Selke, (* 1990), footballer, grew up in Winterbach
