= La Fée Absinthe =

Brand of European absinthes brewed since 2000

- Type: Distilled Spirit
- Manufacturer: Green Utopia
- Origin: France
- Introduced: 2000

La Fée Absinthe is a brand of absinthe, a highly alcoholic, distilled spirit containing the herb wormwood (Artemisia absinthium). La Fée Absinthe was created by Green Utopia, which is owned and run by George Rowley.

La Fée distills a range of six different absinthes: Parisienne, a traditional French style Verte (coloured/green) absinthe; Blanche, a traditional Blanche (white/clear) style; Bohemian, a modern, Czech style absinthe; La Fée X•S Suisse and La Fée X•S Française, which are two “extra supérieure,” wine-based absinthes; and La Fée NV, a lower strength absinthe for "modern drinking."

== La Fée Absinthe Parisienne, Absinthe Supérieure ==
La Fée Absinthe Parisienne was first distilled in July 2000 in association with the Musée de l’Absinthe, Auvers-sur-Oise, France, and its founder and curator, Marie-Claude Delahaye, who is also a Director of La Fée LLP. It was the first absinthe to be legally distilled and bottled in France since the 1915 ban. It is distilled in copper stills at the Cherry Rocher distillery in the Rhône-Alpes region of southeast France and contains nine different herbs and spices, including Artemisia absinthium (Grande Wormwood) and Artemisia pontica (Petite Wormwood). It is bottled at 68% ABV: The traditional strength for French absinthe was 68% ABV - 72% ABV.

The recipe was refined in 2013 and re-launched in UV protective bottles. La Fée Parisienne is coloured naturally, by maceration of herbs in spirit, and can be drunk in the traditional manner of adding 4–6 parts iced water, to one part absinthe, poured over a sugar cube. It is also an ingredient in various classic and modern cocktails.

== La Fée Absinthe Blanche, Absinthe Supérieure ==
La Fée Absinthe Blanche Parisienne was first distilled in 2011 in association with the Musée de l’Absinthe, Auvers-sur-Oise, France, and its founder and curator, Marie-Claude Delahaye. It is distilled in copper stills at the Cherry Rocher distillery in the Rhône-Alpes region of south-east France and contains 11 different herbs and spices, including Artemisia absinthium (Grande Wormwood) and Artemisia pontica (Petite Wormwood). It is bottled at 53% ABV: The traditional strength for Blanche absinthe was 53% ABV - 55% ABV.

La Fée Absinthe Blanche can be drunk in the traditional manner of adding 2-4 parts iced water, to one part absinthe (less dilution is required due to the lower alcoholic strength, and sugar is not usually required for Blanche Absinthe, but some prefer it with). It is also an ingredient in various classic and modern cocktails.

== La Fée Absinthe X•S Suisse, Absinthe Extra Supérieure ==
La Fée X•S Suisse, officially released in 2007, is a La Bleue produced in the town of Couvet in the Val-de-Travers region of Switzerland. Each distillation takes place in small copper stills which have the capacity to produce just over 100 bottles. It has a wine alcohol base.

== La Fée Absinthe X•S Française, Absinthe Extra Supérieure ==
La Fée X•S Française, officially released in 2007, is a naturally colored, wine-alcohol-based verte that is distilled in the town of Pontarlier, the French homeland of absinthe. The production of X•S Française uses traditional distillation methods and stills that were purchased secondhand in 1870.

== La Fée Absinth Bohemian ==
La Fée Absinth Bohemian is a Czech-style, low-anise liquor, first produced south of Prague in Bohemia in November 2004: it is now produced in France. Because of its low levels of anise it does not produce a louche (turning cloudy) when diluted with iced water, and is considered a different product from absinthe (with an 'e'). It is mostly mixed in cocktails rather than being drunk in the traditional manner described for La Fée Absinthe Parisienne. Bohemian uses a grain alcohol base.

== NV Absinthe Verte by La Fée ==
NV Absinthe Verte by La Fée is a modern, lower abv (38%) French absinthe, aimed at the bar, club and all round party scene. Its lower alcohol content allows for greater flexibility with serving options, or allows it to be drunk neat or over ice. NV Absinthe Verte is distilled with Grand Wormwood, and uses a grain alcohol base.

== Cherry Rocher Distillery ==
Established in 1705, the Cherry Rocher distillery is located in La Côte-Saint-André (Isère), in the Rhone-Alpes region of south-east France. Known for producing fine fruit liqueurs, the company continue to work primarily with fruit and herb based spirits and liqueurs. Since 2007, Cherry Rocher has distilled La Fée Absinthe Parisienne, and since 2011 La Fée Absinthe Blanche for the La Fée brand.
