= Absinthiana =

Accoutrements surrounding the drink absinthe and its preparation

Absinthiana is the paraphernalia surrounding the consumption of absinthe. Due to the bitter taste and high alcohol content of this drink (45–72% ABV), a need for dilution with water had led drinkers to a drinking ritual. Originally, absinthe was served in standard stemmed wine or water glasses and water was added from a simple carafe. But as its popularity grew so did the variety of implements used, such as specialty glasses and complex brouilleurs. Many 19th-century companies used the elaborate barware to advertise their brands. Today, many contemporary distilleries are also producing decorative branded barware for the same purpose.

== Absinthe spoon ==
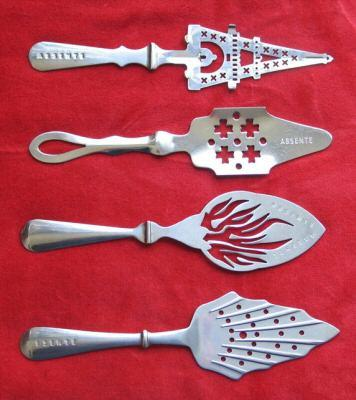
Collection of absinthe spoons

A perforated or slotted spoon, sometimes with a trough, is used to dissolve a sugar cube while slowly adding the ice-cold water to a glass of absinthe. Sugar is used optionally to sweeten the drink and counteract its mild bitterness (prior to the introduction of the spoon, the drink was sweetened with either a simple or gum syrup). The spoon is normally flat, with a notch in the handle where it rests on the rim of the glass. Originating in the mid-1870s (when the mass production of sugar cubes started), their use increased over the 1880s and 1890s and were often stamped with brand names or logos as advertising, much like modern alcohol paraphernalia. Sometimes they were sold as tourist items; for example, some might be shaped like the Eiffel Tower, such as the spoon Eiffel Tower #7, which was made for the inauguration of the building in 1889. Most of the hundreds of designs were quite utilitarian and inexpensive; nonetheless, the vintage spoons currently are collectibles.

A less common variation of the absinthe spoon is similar to iced tea spoons. By contrast, these have a normal spoon bowl and the sugar holder built into the handle.

=== Grilles ===
Another sugar tool, the grille, lacks the overall spoon shape. Rather, it is generally a perforated metal shallow dish with three or more prongs that hold it above the glass. The grille is used in the same way as the spoon.

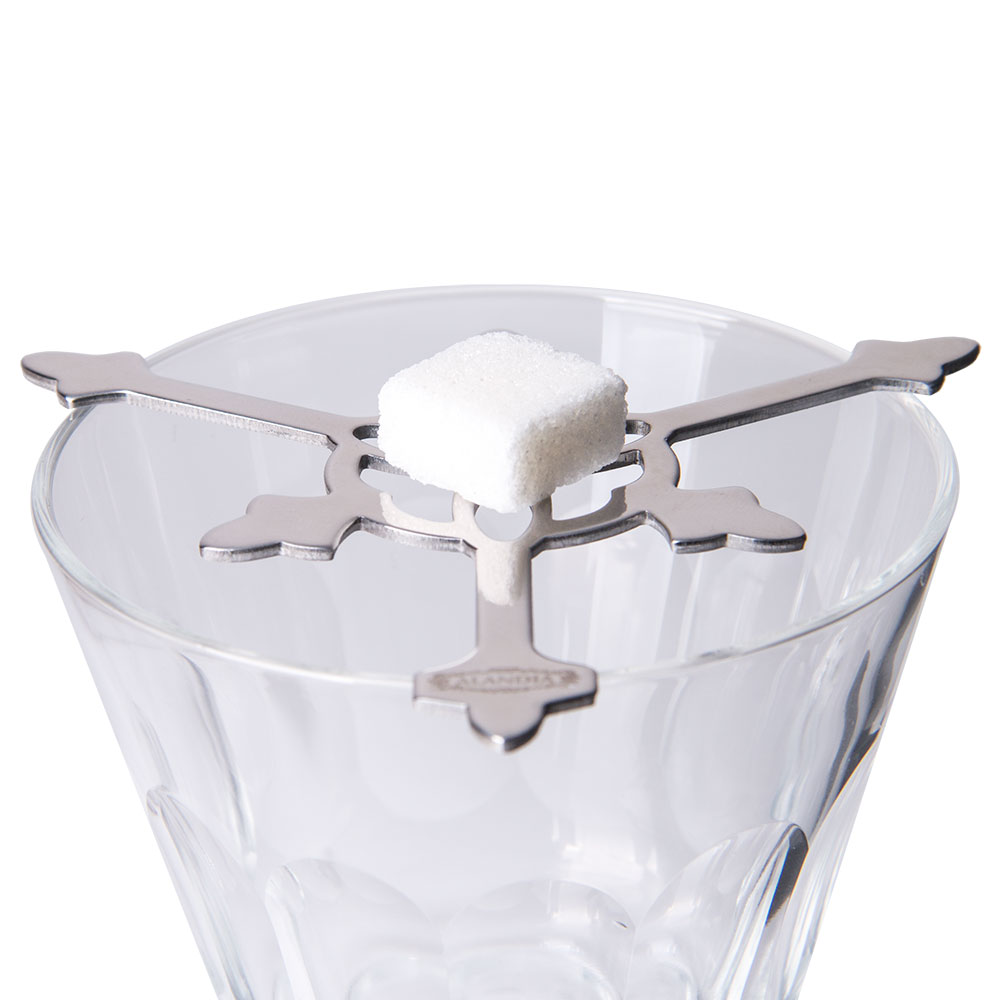
Absinthe grille with sugar cube

== Water drip ==
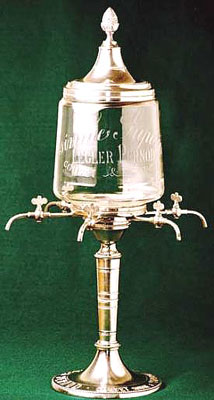
A rare six spigot Legler Pernod absinthe fountain

Adding ice cold water to absinthe is the usual method of preparation, as absinthe is most commonly bottled at high proof with the expectation of being diluted to approximately the strength of wine. The addition of water also causes a clouding, called the louche (called ouzo effect in other drinks).

Properly watering absinthe was considered by some to be an art form to be practiced with patience and finesse, and some bars were frequented by patrons humorously dubbed "Les professeurs d'absinthe" or absinthe teachers who, in exchange for a drink or a small fee, would show new drinkers how to properly add water slowly, allowing the fullest flavor and aromatic character to be obtained from the drink.

=== Carafe ===
A water carafe is the original, and the most basic, way to add water. As with other items, many have been found with brand names on them. The carafe is held above the glass and water is delicately added in a thin stream.

=== Fountain ===
Fountains, ornamental ice-water drip dispensers, appeared in bars and bistros in the late 1800s as absinthe gained greater popularity. The goal was to improve efficiency of the bartender that now was able use the fountain to make multiple drinks simultaneously. The absinthe fountain can also be brought directly to the table, where the patrons use it to properly prepare their absinthe drinks together, without the need for the steady hand required by a carafe.

Most often the fountain design includes a large glass globe with multiple (2–6) spigots filled with ice and water on a tall metal stand. Swiss fountains are occasionally made of pottery with a lot of spigots.

=== Brouilleur ===
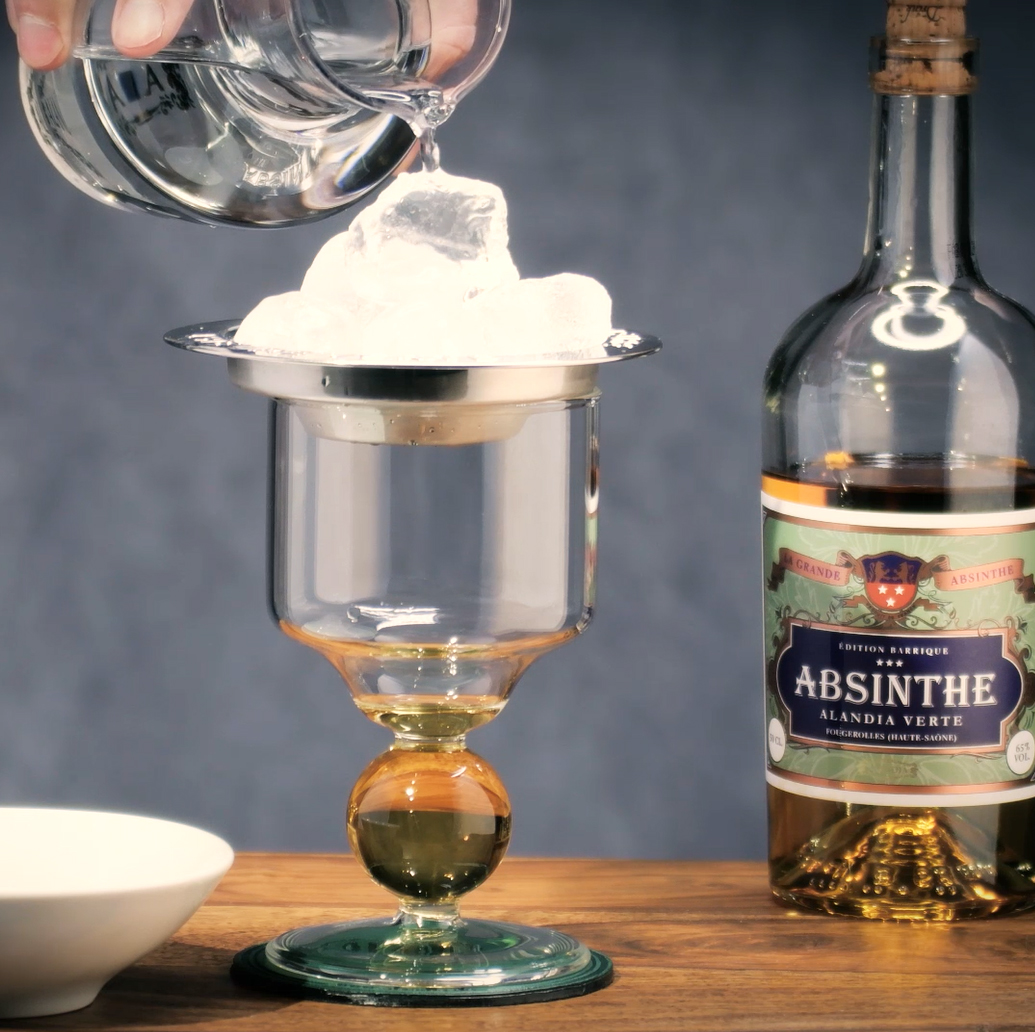
Absinthe bubble glass with a brouilleur

In some instances a device called a brouilleur was employed. A brouilleur is a glass or metal bowl which sits on the absinthe glass and acts like a personal absinthe fountain. Ice and water are added to the bowl, which has a small hole at the bottom, allowing the ice-cold water to slowly drip through. Sugar, if preferred, can be added directly to the bowl, or in some cases to a built-in grille.

== Absinthe glass ==
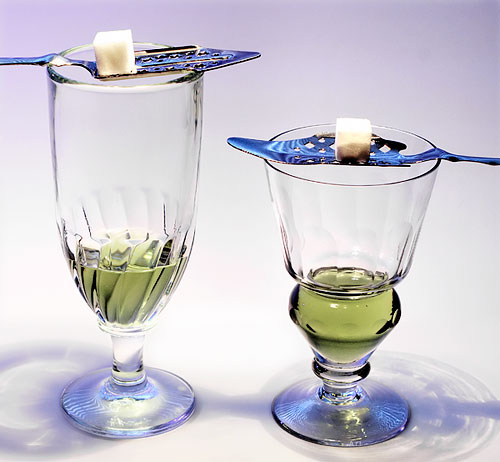
Left: Swirl glass. Right: Pontarlier reservoir glass.

Absinthe was originally served in normal bar-ware, but eventually specialised glasses became somewhat popular (regular water goblets and wine glasses are still used widely). The absinthe glasses would commonly have a short thick stem and faceting or some other feature to indicate the correct portion to pour. Some were simply etched with a line or marked by a glass bead, showing how much absinthe should be poured, with another line or bead indicating the level to add water up to (the common ratio of water to absinthe is 5:1, diluting the absinthe to 11–15% ABV, close to the regular wine). The term 'reservoir glass' describes several styles of stemware with a distinct bulge at the bottom volumetrically equal to a standard shot or sometimes a half-shot, the remainder of the glass to be filled with water providing the correct ratio of admixture. They were among the first type of glass made specifically for absinthe. A less common variation, called the bubble-reservoir glass, contains a bubble-shaped reservoir connected to the glass by a narrow neck or portal, which allows the absinthe and water to slowly suffuse into each other, accentuating the appearance of the louche.

== Modern absinthiana ==
A revival of absinthe began in the 1990s following the adoption of modern European Union food and beverage laws which removed long-standing barriers to its production and sale. As absinthe has re-emerged, so has the paraphernalia associated with it. Several companies produce replica absinthiana and several have modernized the traditional designs. Whereas absinthe barware of the 19th century was primarily used as inexpensive promotional items, the modern versions are often cast of silver, or ornately manufactured to the standard of jewelry.

== Sources ==
- Stone, Gwydion (20 October 2021a). "Absinthe Drip". In David Wondrich; Noah Rothbaum (eds.). The Oxford Companion to Spirits and Cocktails. Oxford University Press. pp. 3–4. ISBN 978-0-19-931113-2. OCLC 1240305567.
- Stone, Gwydion (20 October 2021b). "absinthe fountain". In David Wondrich; Noah Rothbaum (eds.). The Oxford Companion to Spirits and Cocktails. Oxford University Press. p. 4. ISBN 978-0-19-931113-2. OCLC 1240305567.
- Stone, Gwydion (20 October 2021c). "absinthe spoon". In David Wondrich; Noah Rothbaum (eds.). The Oxford Companion to Spirits and Cocktails. Oxford University Press. p. 5. ISBN 978-0-19-931113-2. OCLC 1240305567.
- Kennedy, Pagan (November 16, 2012). "Who Made That Sugar Cube?". New York Times.
- Lachenmeier, Dirk W.; Walch, Stephan G.; Padosch, Stephan A.; Kröner, Lars U. (2006). "Absinthe – A Review". Critical Reviews in Food Science and Nutrition. 46 (5): 365–377. doi:10.1080/10408690590957322. PMID 16891209. S2CID 43251156.
- Holstege, Christopher P.; Baylor, Michael R.; Rusyniak, Daniel E. (2002). "Absinthe: Return of the Green Fairy". Seminars in Neurology. 22 (1): 089–094. doi:10.1055/s-2002-33051. eISSN 1098-9021. ISSN 0271-8235. PMID 12170397.
