= Death in the Afternoon (cocktail) =

Cocktail made up of absinthe and Champagne

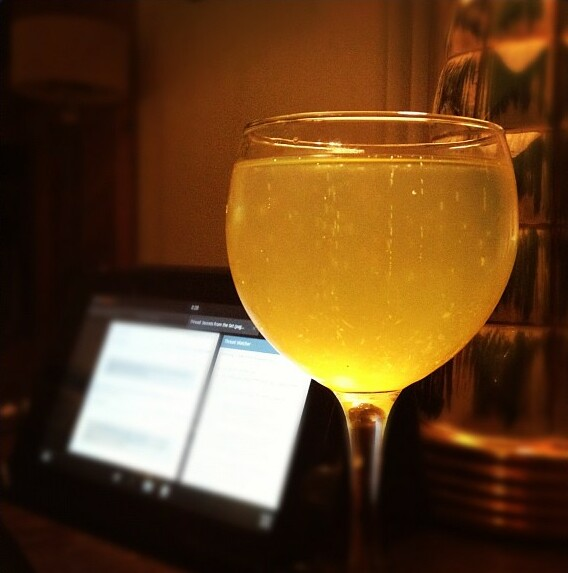
- Death in the Afternoon
- Type: Wine cocktail
- Base spirit: Champagne, Absinthe
- Standard drinkware: Champagne flute

Death in the Afternoon, also called the Hemingway or the Hemingway Champagne, is a cocktail made up of absinthe and Champagne, invented by Ernest Hemingway. The cocktail shares a name with Hemingway's 1932 book Death in the Afternoon, and the recipe was published in So Red the Nose, or Breath in the Afternoon, a 1935 cocktail book with contributions from famous authors. Hemingway's original instructions were:

"Pour one jigger absinthe into a Champagne glass. Add iced Champagne until it attains the proper opalescent milkiness. Drink three to five of these slowly."

It is claimed that the cocktail was invented by Hemingway after he spent time in the Left Bank, Paris, and enjoyed the absinthe there. The original printed recipe for the drink claimed that it was invented "by the author and three officers of H.M.S. Danae after having spent seven hours overboard trying to get Capt. Bra Saunders’ fishing boat off a bank where she had gone with us in a N.W. gale." Death in the Afternoon is known for both its decadence and its high strength.

There are a number of alternative ways to produce Death in the Afternoon. The absinthe can be added to the glass after the Champagne, as some brands of absinthe will float on the Champagne for a short time. Other alternatives have arisen because of the difficulty of acquiring absinthe; the absinthe can be replaced with Absente, an alternative to absinthe available where it is illegal, or a strong pastis, such as Pernod. Variants which use an alternative to absinthe are sometimes given a different name, but are also sometimes still referred to as Death in the Afternoon. Some recipes direct the person making the cocktail to use ingredients in addition to the Champagne and absinthe; Valerie Mellema recommends that a sugar cube and several dashes of bitters be added to the glass prior to the main ingredients.

The cocktail is milky in appearance on account of the spontaneous emulsification of the absinthe (or substitute), and bubbly, which it takes from the Champagne. After the first sip, however, it becomes significantly less bubbly. Harold McGee, dining and wine writer for The New York Times, said that it "seemed a waste of effervescence" (though substituting Pernod for the absinthe).

== See also ==
- List of cocktails
