= Lucid =

Lucid may refer to:

== Arts and entertainment ==
- Lucid (2005 film), a Canadian film directed by Sean Garrity
- Lucid (2025 film), a Canadian film directed by Ramsey Fendall and Deanna Milligan
- Lucid (Lyfe Jennings album), 2013
- Lucid (Aṣa album), 2019
- "Lucid" (song), a 2020 song by Rina Sawayama
- "Lucid", a 2023 song by (G)I-dle from I Feel
- Lucid, a 2015 novel by Jay Bonansinga

== Businesses ==
- Lucid Inc., a software development company
- Lucid Games, a British videogame company
- Lucid Records, an American independent record label
- Lucid Motors, an electric car company formerly called Atieva
- Lucid Software, a diagramming software company

== Military ==
- Operation Lucid, British military plan to use fireships to attack France in World War II
- USS Lucid, two U.S. Navy ships

== People ==
- Con Lucid (1874–1931), American baseball player
- Lucid Fall (born 1975), South Korean singer-songwriter
- Shannon Lucid (born 1943), American astronaut

== Science and technology ==
- Lucid (programming language), a dataflow programming language
- LucidDB, an open-source database package
- Lucid Lynx, a version of Ubuntu Linux released in April 2010
- LUCID (Langton Ultimate Cosmic ray Intensity Detector), a cosmic ray detector

== Other uses ==
- Lucid Absinthe, a distilled beverage made from grande wormwood
- LUCID (packaging register), a database of the ZSVR following the German Packaging Act
- Lucid dream, a dream wherein the dreamer realises they are dreaming during the dream

== See also ==
- Lucidity (disambiguation)
