= Absente =

Brand name of 110 proof anise liqueur

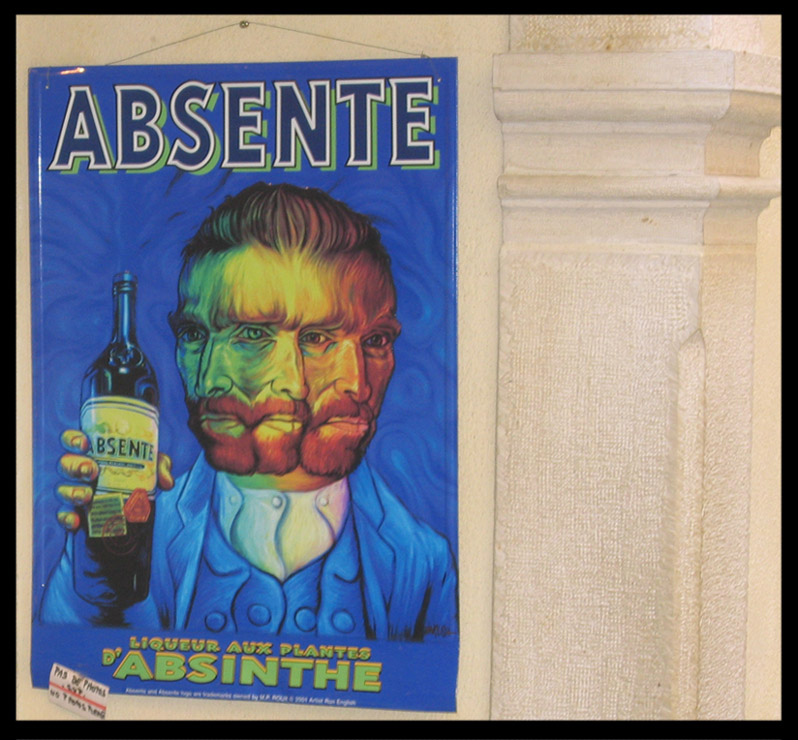

Absente is a brand name of 110 proof anise liqueur that has been marketed under the tagline "Absinthe Refined" since c. 2000. "Absente" is a French word that translates as "absent" in English.

== In the U.S. ==
Prior to 2009, Absente sold in the U.S. contained no grande wormwood (Artemisia absinthium), the essential herb from which absinthe derives its name. The maker substituted southernwood (Artemisia abrotanum) and the product was bottled with sugar, two critical aspects that differentiated Absente as an anise liqueur and not an absinthe by any traditional reference. The ingredients of Absente are listed in order as alcohol, sugar, a combination of "essences", infusions and distillates, and two artificial dyes, FD&C Yellow #5 and Blue #1.

Absente's U.S. marketing effort had long sought to associate the liqueur with traditional absinthe through statements such as, "The only difference is we replaced Wormwood...with a less bitter cousin called Southern-Wormwood, also known as "Petite Absinthe," which allows us to offer Absente in the United States." The reference to "petite absinthe" is inaccurate, as petite absinthe refers invariably to 'Roman wormwood' (Artemisia pontica) throughout credible distillation treatises, while 'southernwood' is historically referred to as aurone, abrotone, or armoise citronelle, and is scarcely ever mentioned, if at all. At that time, Absente's website explained, "By maintaining a form of wormwood in Absente, we are able to truly call Absente a modern Absinthe."

Following the re-legalization of genuine absinthe in the U.S. in 2007, the North American importer introduced a reformulated version that includes grande wormwood (April, 2009) in an apparent effort to improve its consumer appeal. The new label proclaims, "Now With Wormwood!". Since 2016 it has been marketed as “traditional absinthe with wormwood”

== In Europe ==
The version marketed in Europe under the same name is and has always been made with "essence of grande wormwood" (Artemisia absinthium). The label design differs mildly from the U.S. version by having "Liqueur aux Plantes d'Absinthe" above the main label and a silver capsule.
