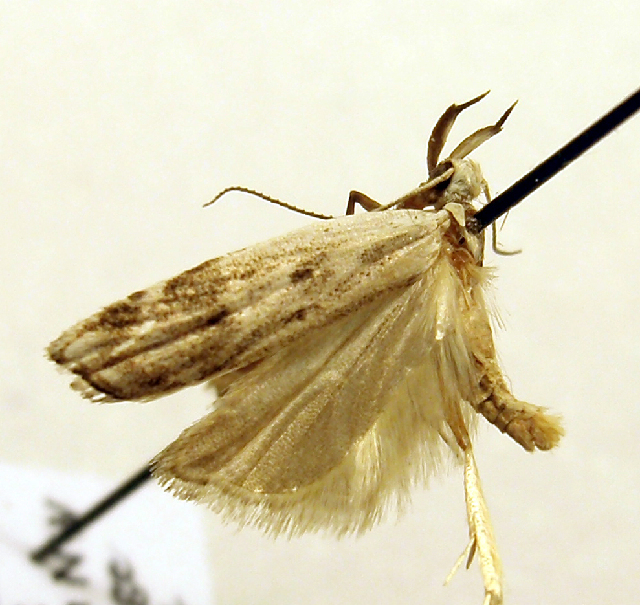

Scientific classification
- Domain: Eukaryota
- Kingdom: Animalia
- Phylum: Arthropoda
- Class: Insecta
- Order: Lepidoptera
- Family: Gelechiidae
- Genus: Dichomeris
- Species: D. rasilella

Binomial name
- Dichomeris rasilella (Herrich-Schäffer, 1854)

Synonyms
- Anacampsis rasilella Herrich-Schäffer, 1854; Mistax lacrimella Caradja, 1920; Uliaria rasilella var. insulella Dumont, 1921; Uliaria occidentella Zerny, 1927

= Dichomeris rasilella =

Species of moth

Dichomeris rasilella is a moth in the family Gelechiidae. It is found in China (Shaanxi, Zhejiang), Taiwan, Korea, Japan, Russia and Europe, where it has been recorded from Spain, France, Italy, Estonia, Latvia, Ukraine, Belarus, Poland, Romania, the Czech Republic and Slovakia.

The wingspan is 15–16 mm (0.59–0.63 in).

The larvae feed on Artemisia vulgaris var. orientalis, Artemisia vulgaris var. indica, Artemisia pontica, Centaurea species and Acosta rhenana.
