= Hill's Absinth =

Czech brand of wormwood bitters related to absinthe

- Type: Absinthe
- Manufacturer: Hill's Liquere
- Origin: Czech Republic
- Introduced: 1990
- Alcohol by volume: 70%
- Website: www.absinth.cz

Hill's is a brand of Bohemian-style absinth owned and produced by the Czech company Hill's Liquere. Hill's Absinth was the first Czech absinth after the Velvet Revolution.
