= Kübler Absinthe =

Swiss brand of absinthe first produced in 1863

Kübler Absinthe Superieure
- Type: Absinthe
- Manufacturer: Blackmint (Kübler & Wyss)
- Origin: Switzerland
- Introduced: 2007 in United States
- Alcohol by volume: 53.0%
- Proof (US): 106

Kübler Absinthe Superieure is a brand of absinthe, distilled in the Val-de-Travers region of Switzerland also known as the "birthplace of absinthe". Kübler Absinthe was first produced in 1863 and was the first brand to be sold legally in Switzerland after the national ban on absinthe was lifted in March, 2005. The legalization of absinthe in Switzerland is largely due to Kübler's lobbying efforts. The United States Alcohol and Tobacco Tax and Trade Bureau (TTB) approved the formula for Kübler Absinthe in 2004, and approved the product for sale in the United States in May 2007 after three years of discussions among Kübler, Food and Drug Administration, TTB, and U.S. Customs and Border Protection. These discussions proved to be instrumental in opening the door for many brands of absinthe to be legally sold or produced in the United States.

Kübler was launched in 1863 by J. Fritz Kübler in Môtiers, Switzerland and is now a part of the Altamar Brands portfolio. Môtiers is the capital of the Val-de-Travers, the birthplace of absinthe. This region sits near the eastern border of France. Fritz opened the Blackmint Distillery in 1875, and received numerous awards and medals in competitions around the European theater before the Swiss government banned absinthe in 1910.

In 2001, the Swiss ban was lifted and the brand was revived by Fritz's great grandson Yves (a fifth generation Kübler), who runs the distillery only a few miles from its original site in the Val-de-Travers.

== Crafting process ==
The principal ingredients in Kübler Absinthe are the herbs grande wormwood (Artemisia absinthium) and anise. Kübler uses a grain neutral base spirit distilled from Swiss wheat and also includes hyssop, lemon balm, coriander, star anise, fennel, Roman wormwood and mint. All ingredients are analytically certified to the standards of the Swiss Expert Committee on the Unification of Pharmacopoeias.

Kübler Absinthe is distilled using the same traditional method that has been used for over one hundred years. Following the initial maceration is a slow distillation process. Neither sugar nor artificial coloring is added to the finished distillate. The end product is an all-natural, genuine Swiss clear or 'La Bleue' absinthe, and is bottled at 106 proof (53% ABV).

== Family tradition ==
J.F. Kübler, the patriarch of the family, started the Kübler Absinthe tradition (1863). It continued until the Swiss absinthe prohibition was enacted on October 7, 1910. On October 10, 2001, exactly 91 years and three days after the start of the Swiss prohibition, Yves Kübler's first objective was reached: the distillation and sale of his first 500 liters of Kübler absinthe in Europe.

In March 2005, all federal Swiss absinthe laws were repealed, giving Yves the right to continue the tradition his great grandfather created. Kübler Absinthe is now available in many markets, including the United States.

== Accolades ==
Proof66.com, an aggregator of liquor ratings information from expert evaluators, describes the Kübler Superieure as a "Tier 1" spirit in its exotics category. Such spirits are said to have won "the highest recommendation."
