= Roman wormwood =

Roman wormwood is a common name for several plants and it may refer to:

- Artemisia pontica
- Ambrosia artemisiifolia
