= McCarthy's Single Malt =

McCarthy's Oregon Single Malt Whiskey is an American single malt whiskey produced by the Clear Creek Distillery.

== Production ==
Noted for being one of the first American single malts introduced after Prohibition and aged for three years in the foothills of Mount Hood, Oregon, McCarthy's is made from 100% malted barley imported from Scotland. It is heavily peated, in the Islay tradition of single malt scotch, and draws comparisons to prominent whiskies such as Lagavulin. McCarthy's was a pioneer of the single malt American whisky revival in the early 1990s and has received equal praise and attention in the years following. The 2008 release received a 96 rating (out of 100) in Jim Murray's Whisky Bible.

Current production is headed by veteran American craft distillers Joseph O'Sullivan and Caitlin Bartlemay.
