= George Rowley (entrepreneur) =

British entrepreneur (born 1964)

George Rowley (born 1964) is a British entrepreneur who is often credited with starting the absinthe revival in the popular market in Western Europe.

Rowley was born in England, started his career within insurance and moved to Prague in the early 1990s to assist a local subsidiary.

It was in Prague that he first experienced both Czech beer and absinth, and he launched several alcoholic drinks ventures when he moved back to England. In 1996, he founded Bohemia Beer House Ltd. (later BBH Spirits).

In 1998 he applied EU directive No. 88/388/EEC (which included the legal limits for thujone) to absinthe. The testing was approved by UK Trading Standards in June 1998.

In 1998 he launched Czech absinth in the UK and his action became one of the catalysts for the resurgence of absinthe in Europe and the world. He also launched eAbsinthe, then the world's first absinthe e-tailer.

In 2000, with the assistance of Marie-Claude Delahaye, founder and curator of the Absinthe Museum, Auvers-sur-Oise, France, he launched his own brand, La Fée Absinthe, the first traditional distilled absinthe commercially produced in France since the 1915 ban.

In 2010, with Marie-Claude Delahaye, he presented evidence to the FFS in support of the repeal of the French Absinthe ban of 1915.
