= Fenchone =

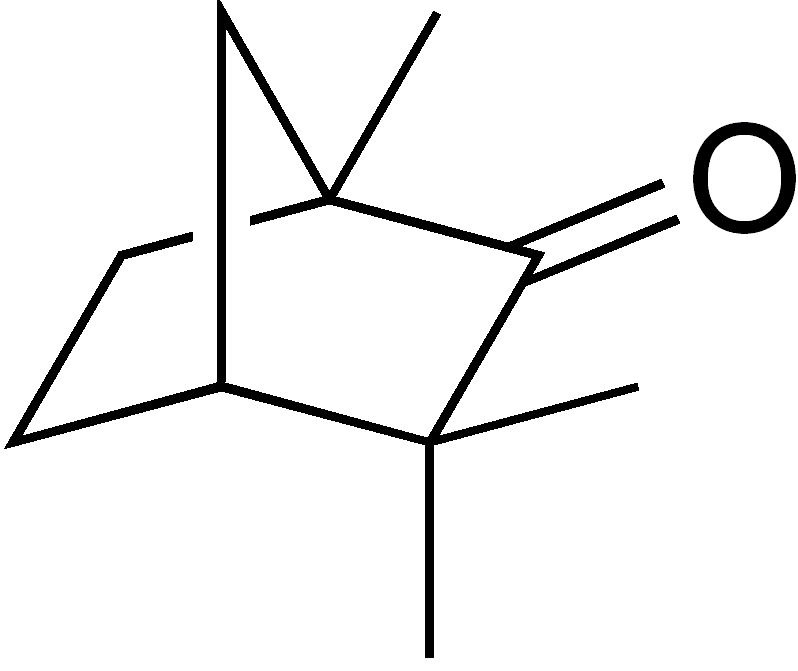

Names
- IUPAC name 1,3,3-Trimethylbicyclo[2.2.1]heptan-2-one
- Other names 1,3,3-Trimethyl-2-norcamphanone

Identifiers
CAS Number	1195-79-5; 4695-62-9 D; 7787-20-4 L
3D model (JSmol)	Interactive image
ChEBI	CHEBI:4999; CHEBI:165 D; CHEBI:36612 L
ChemSpider	13869
ECHA InfoCard	100.013.458
KEGG	C11387
PubChem CID	14525
UNII	4Q6W8568TG; S436YKU51N D; K6G5Y2Y3Q2 L
CompTox Dashboard (EPA)	DTXSID9025324
- InChI: InChI=1S/C10H16O/c1-9(2)7-4-5-10(3,6-7)8(9)11/h7H,4-6H2,1-3H3 Key: LHXDLQBQYFFVNW-UHFFFAOYSA-N; InChI=1/C10H16O/c1-9(2)7-4-5-10(3,6-7)8(9)11/h7H,4-6H2,1-3H3 Key: LHXDLQBQYFFVNW-UHFFFAOYAX
- SMILES: O=C1C(C)(C)C2CC1(C)CC2

Properties
Chemical formula	C_{10}H_{16}O
Molar mass	152.23 g/mol
Density	0.948 g/cm^{3}
Melting point	6.1 °C (43.0 °F; 279.2 K)
Boiling point	193.5 °C (380.3 °F; 466.6 K)
Refractive index (n_{D})	1.4625
- Except where otherwise noted, data are given for materials in their standard state (at 25 °C [77 °F], 100 kPa). verify (what is ?) Infobox references

Fenchone is an organic compound classified as a monoterpenoid and a ketone. It is a colorless oily liquid. It has a structure and an odor similar to those of camphor. Fenchone is a constituent of absinthe and the essential oil of fennel. Fenchone is used as a flavor in foods and in perfumery.

Other names for fenchone include dl-fenchone and (±)-fenchone. It is a mixture of the enantiomers d-fenchone and l-fenchone. Other names for d-fenchone include (+)-fenchone and (1S,4R)-fenchone. Other names for l-fenchone include (−)-fenchone and (1R,4S)-fenchone. The d-fenchone enantiomer occurs in pure form in wild, bitter and sweet fennel plants and seeds, whereas the l-fenchone enantiomer occurs in pure form in wormwood, tansy, and cedarleaf.
