= Clear Creek Distillery =

Distillery in Hood River, Oregon, US

Clear Creek Distillary
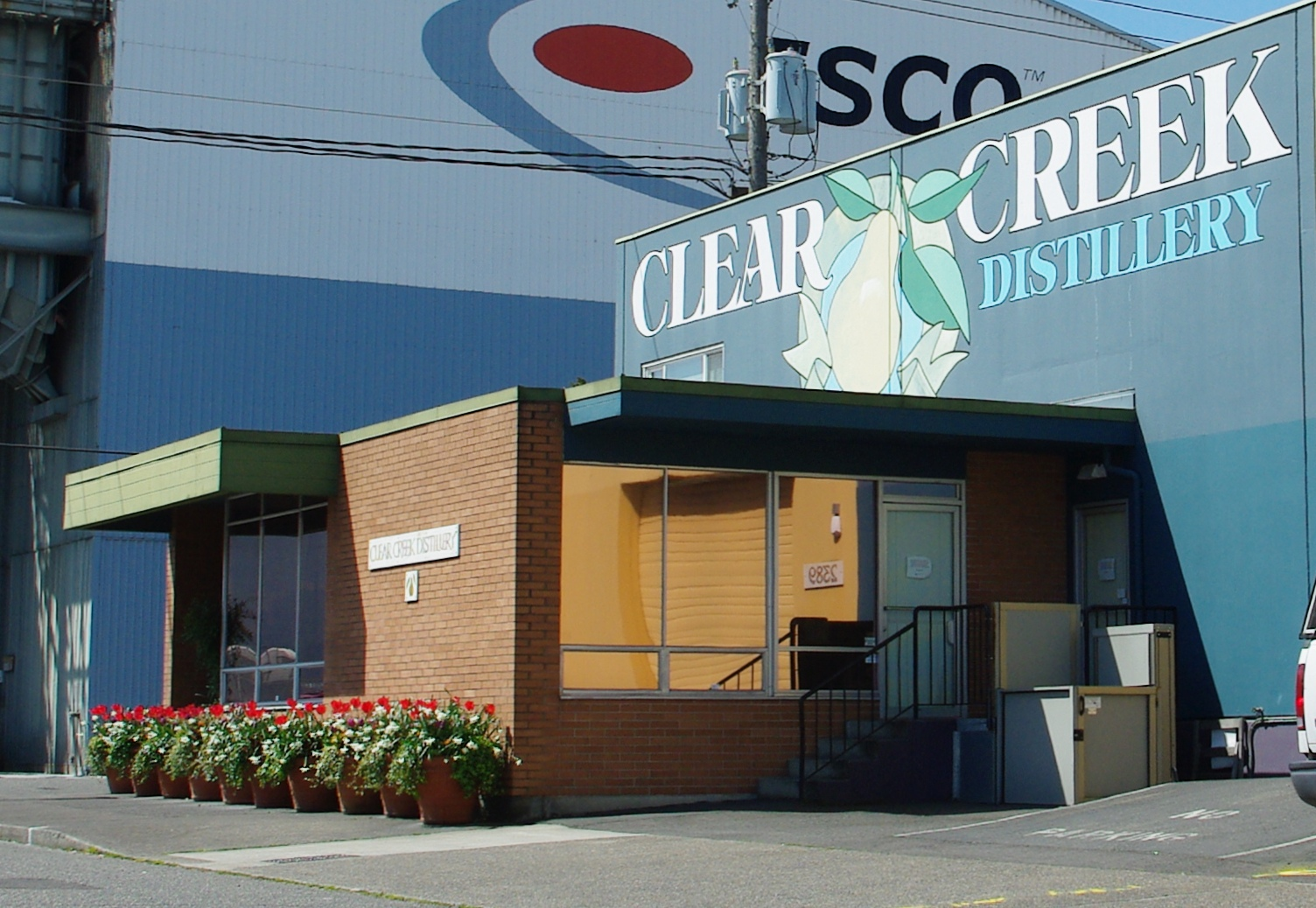
- Industry: Distillery
- Founded: 1985
- Founder: Steve McCarthy
- Headquarters: 45.53784°N 122.7005°W, Portland, Oregon, U.S.
- Products: Distilled and blended liquors
- Owner: Steve McCarthy
- Website: clearcreekdistillery.com

Clear Creek Distillery is a distillery based in Hood River, Oregon, United States, and formerly in Portland, Oregon. Founded in 1985, it has been owned by Hood River Distillers since 2014. It is most well known for its eau de vie produced from Bartlett pears, though today it also makes a variety of other fruit brandies, aged spirits, and liqueurs.

== History ==
Clear Creek Distillery was founded in 1985 by Stephen McCarthy. The McCarthy family had owned orchards in Oregon since the turn of the century, although Stephen had been running the family's alternative business of manufacturing parts for hunting guns. This endeavor required travel to Europe, where he encountered the Alsace tradition of producing pear eau de vie. He decided to begin making eau de vie from the Bartlett pears grown widely in Oregon after concluding they were similar to the Williams pears that were often used for eau de vie production in Europe. He produced the first batches of the spirit in 1985.

The production of European-style fruit brandies is relatively unusual in the United States, and the Clear Creek Distillery is one of the best known American eau de vie distilleries. The beverage is still a niche product not consumed by most U.S. drinkers.

The company was sold to Hood River Distillers in 2014.

== Products ==
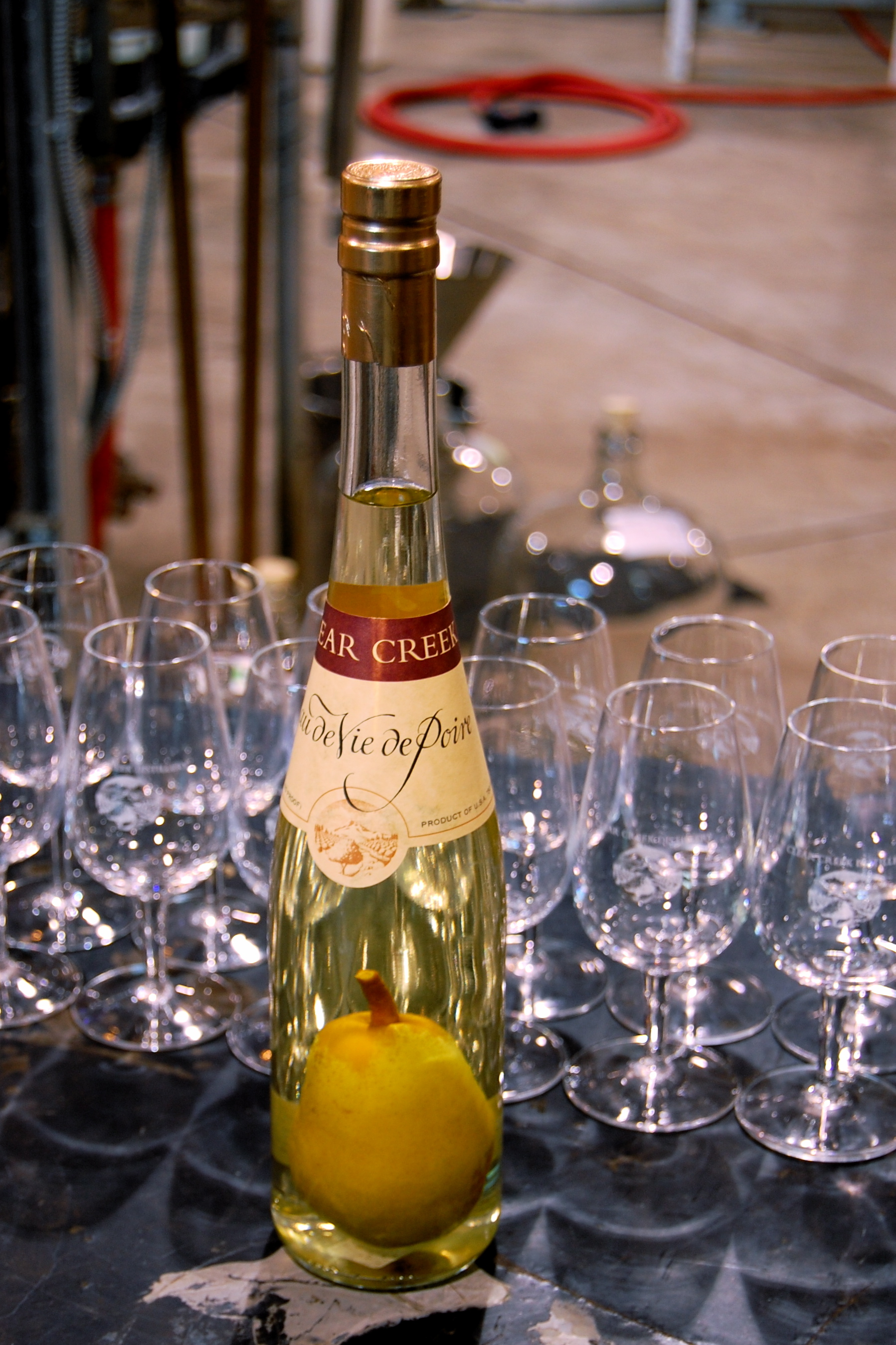
The distillery's "pear in a bottle" eau de vie

Based on the traditional eau de vie de Poire Williams, Clear Creek Distillery's pear eau de vie is its most popular product, and it also sells a limited-edition version with a pear grown inside the bottle.

It also makes other traditional varieties of fruit brandy such as an aged apple brandy made from Golden Delicious apples, grappa from Oregon wine grapes, framboise, Mirabelle plum eau de vie, kirschwasser, and slivovitz. More unusually, Clear Creek produces an eau de vie that includes some of the spring buds of the Douglas fir tree.

Clear Creek also makes a variety of fruit-based liqueurs and McCarthy's Single Malt whiskey.
