= Absinthe =

Alcoholic drink

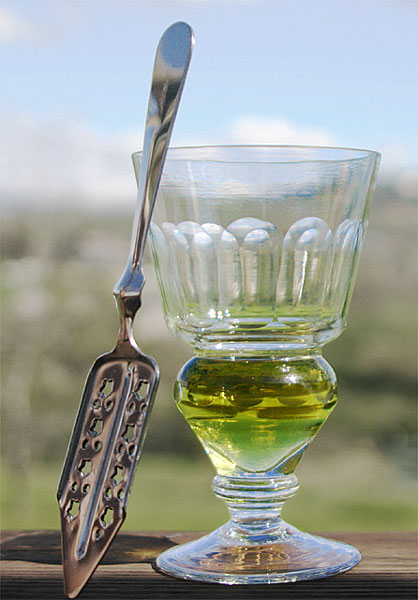
- Reservoir glass with naturally coloured verte absinthe and an absinthe spoon
- Type: Spirit
- Origin: Switzerland
- Alcohol by volume: 45–74%
- Proof (US): 90–148
- Colour: Green
- Flavour: Anise
- Ingredients: Wormwood; Anise; Fennel

Absinthe (/ˈæbsɪnθ, -sæ̃θ/, French: [apsɛ̃t]) is an anise-flavoured spirit derived from several plants, including the flowers and leaves of Artemisia absinthium ("grand wormwood"), together with green anise, sweet fennel, and other medicinal and culinary herbs. Historically described as a highly alcoholic spirit, it is 45–74% ABV or 90–148 proof in the US. Absinthe traditionally has a natural green colour but may also be colourless. Historical literature commonly refers to it as la fée verte 'the green fairy'. Although people sometimes casually call it a liqueur, absinthe is not traditionally bottled with sugar or sweeteners. Absinthe is traditionally bottled at a high level of alcohol by volume, but it is normally diluted with water before being consumed.

Absinthe was created in the canton of Neuchâtel in Switzerland in the late 18th century by the French physician Pierre Ordinaire. It rose to great popularity as an alcoholic drink in late 19th- and early 20th-century France, particularly among Parisian artists and writers. Social conservatives and prohibitionists opposed absinthe consumption, partly because it was associated with bohemian culture. From Europe and the Americas, notable absinthe drinkers included Ernest Hemingway, James Joyce, Lewis Carroll, Charles Baudelaire, Paul Verlaine, Arthur Rimbaud, and Henri de Toulouse-Lautrec.

Absinthe has often been portrayed as a dangerously addictive psychoactive drug and hallucinogen, which gave birth to the term absinthism. The chemical compound thujone, which is present in the spirit in trace amounts, was blamed for its alleged harmful effects. By 1915, absinthe had been banned in the United States and much of Europe, including France, the Netherlands, Belgium, Switzerland, and Austria-Hungary, though it has not been demonstrated to be any more dangerous than ordinary spirits. Recent studies have shown that absinthe's psychoactive properties, apart from those attributable to its alcohol content, have been exaggerated.

Absinthe's revival began in the 1990s, following the adoption of modern European Union food and beverage laws that removed long-standing barriers to its production and sale. By the early 21st century, nearly 200 absinthe brands were being produced in a dozen countries, most notably France, Switzerland, Austria, Germany, the Netherlands, Spain, and the Czech Republic.

== Etymology ==
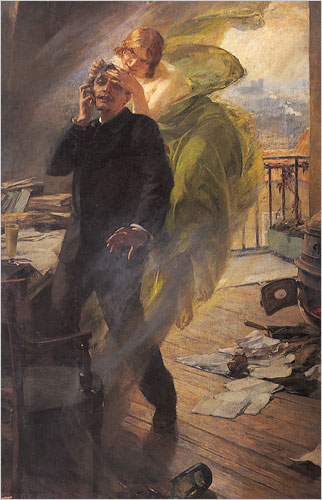
Albert Maignan's Green Muse (1895): a poet succumbs to the Green Fairy.

The French word absinthe can refer to either the alcoholic beverage or, less commonly, the wormwood plant. Absinthe is derived from the Latin absinthium, which in turn comes from the Greek ἀψίνθιον apsínthion 'wormwood'. Some argue that the word means "undrinkable" in Greek, but it may instead be linked to the Persian root, in Persian called spand or aspand or the variant esfand, which meant Peganum harmala, also called Syrian rue in English, although it is not a variety of rue, another famously bitter herb. That Artemisia absinthium was commonly burned as a protective offering may suggest that its origins lie in the reconstructed Proto-Indo-European language root *spend, meaning "to perform a ritual" or "make an offering". It is unclear whether the word was borrowed from Persian into Greek or comes from a common ancestor. Alternatively, the Greek word may originate in a pre-Greek substrate word, marked by the non-Indo-European consonant complex -νθ -nth. Alternative spellings for absinthe include absinth, absynthe, and absenta. Absinth (without the final e) is a spelling variant most commonly applied to absinthes produced in central and eastern Europe, and is specifically associated with Bohemian-style absinthes.

== History ==
The precise origin of absinthe is unclear. The medical use of wormwood dates back to ancient Egypt, and the Ebers Papyrus mentions it from around 1550 BC. The ancient Greeks used wormwood extracts and wine-soaked wormwood leaves as remedies. Moreover, some evidence suggests a wormwood-flavoured wine in ancient Greece called absinthites oinos. Lucretius' De Rerum Natura (I, 936–950) says that a drink containing wormwood was given as medicine to children in a cup with honey on the brim to make it drinkable.

The earliest evidence of absinthe, a distilled spirit containing green anise and fennel, dates to the 18th century. According to popular legend, Dr. Pierre Ordinaire, a French doctor living in Couvet, Switzerland, created it as an all-purpose patent remedy around 1792 (the exact date varies by account). The Henriod sisters of Couvet received Ordinaire's recipe and sold it as a medicinal elixir. Other accounts suggest the Henriod sisters may have been making the elixir before Ordinaire arrived. Either way, Major Dubied acquired the formula from the sisters in 1797 and, with his son Marcellin and son-in-law Henry-Louis Pernod, opened the first absinthe distillery, Dubied Père et Fils, in Couvet. In 1805, they built a second distillery in Pontarlier, France, under the company name Maison Pernod Fils. Pernod Fils remained one of the most popular brands of absinthe until the drink was banned in France in 1914.

=== Growth of consumption ===
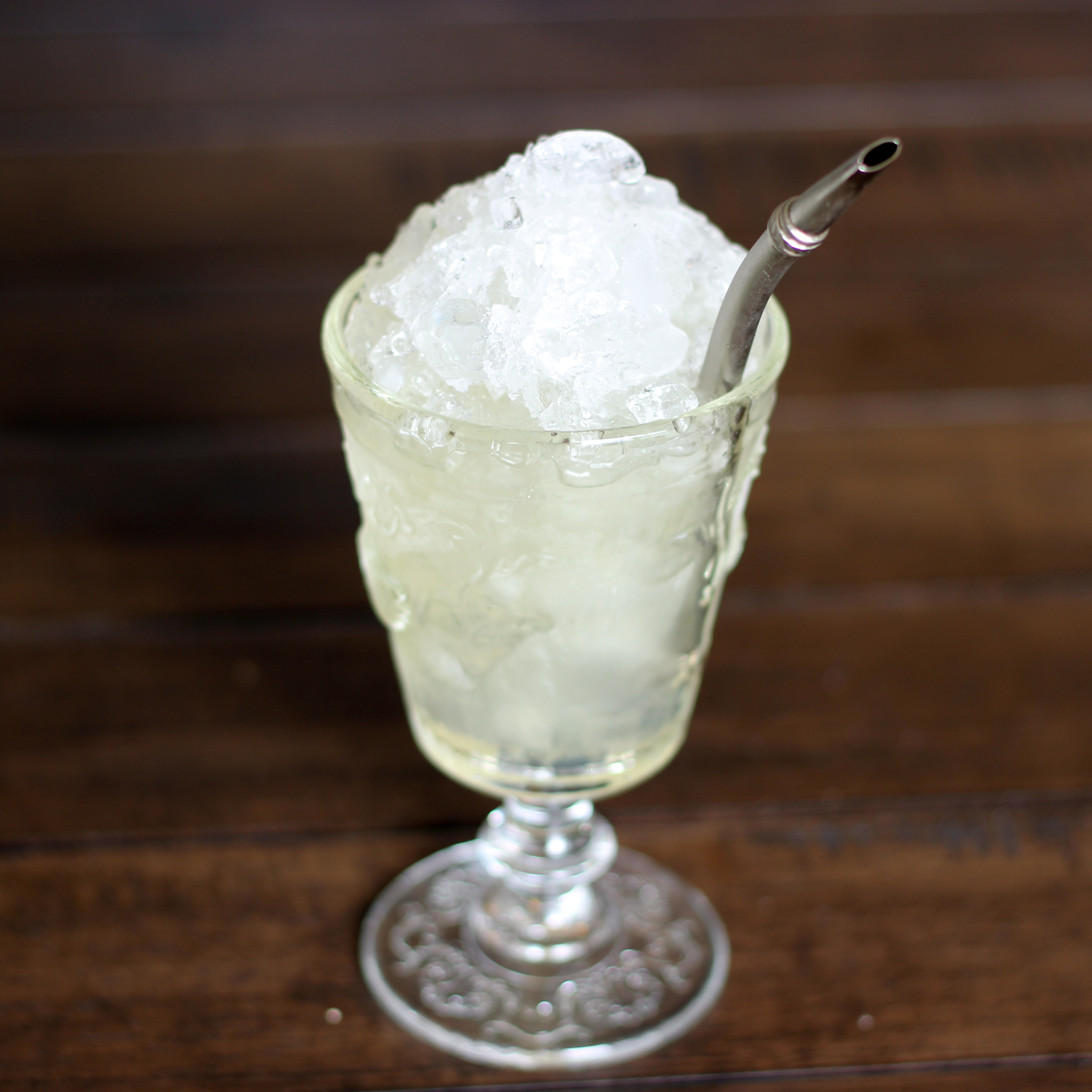
An absinthe frappé, a common way to serve absinthe with simple syrup, water, and crushed ice

Absinthe's popularity grew steadily through the 1840s, when it was given to French troops in Algeria as a malaria preventive, and the troops brought home their taste for it. By the 1860s, absinthe was so popular in bars, bistros, cafés, and cabarets that 5 pm became known as l'heure verte 'the green hour'. It was favoured by all social classes, from the wealthy bourgeoisie to poor artists and ordinary working-class people. By the 1880s, mass production had caused the price to drop sharply, and the French were drinking 36,000,000 litres (~7,900,000 Imperial gallons, ~9,500,000 USCS gallons) per year by 1910.

France and Switzerland exported absinthe widely, and it gained some popularity in other countries, including Spain, the United Kingdom, the United States, and the Czech Republic. Spain and Portugal never banned it, and its production and consumption have never ceased. It saw a temporary popularity spike in the early 20th century, coinciding with the Art Nouveau and Modernism aesthetic movements.

New Orleans has a cultural association with absinthe and is credited as the birthplace of the Sazerac, perhaps the earliest absinthe cocktail. The Old Absinthe House bar on Bourbon Street began selling absinthe in the first half of the 19th century. Its Catalan leaseholder, Cayetano Ferrer, named it the Absinthe Room in 1874 because of the drink's popularity, and it was served in the Parisian style. It was frequented by Mark Twain, Oscar Wilde, Franklin Delano Roosevelt, Aleister Crowley, and Frank Sinatra.

=== Bans ===
Absinthe became associated with violent crimes and social disorder, and one modern writer claims that this trend was spurred by fabricated claims and smear campaigns, which he claims were orchestrated by the temperance movement and the wine industry. One critic claimed:

Absinthe makes you crazy and criminal, provokes epilepsy and tuberculosis, and has killed thousands of French people. It makes a ferocious beast of the man, a martyr of the woman, and a degenerate of the infant, it disorganizes and ruins the family and menaces the future of the country.

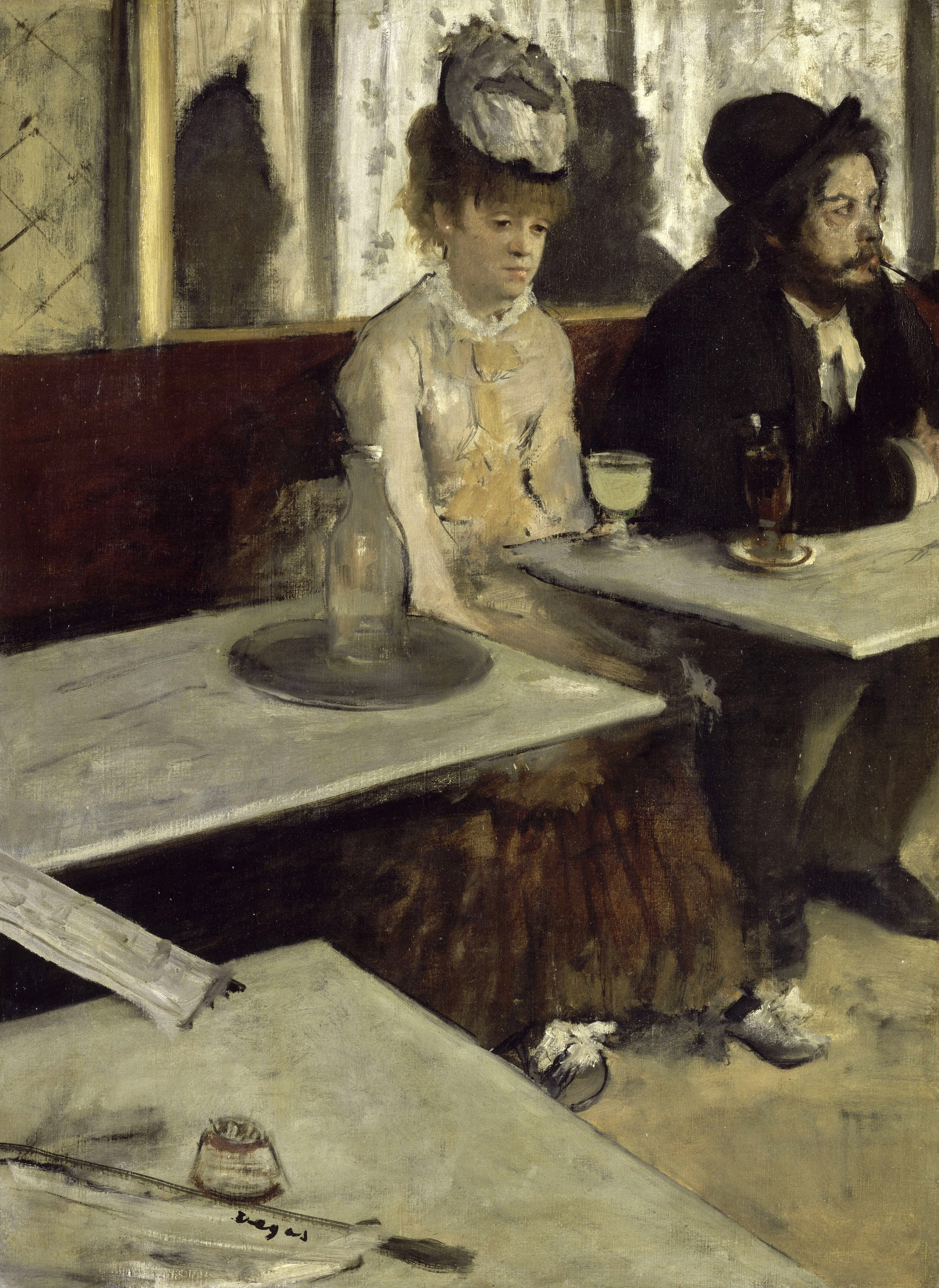
L'Absinthe, by Edgar Degas, 1876

Edgar Degas's 1876 painting The Absinthe Drinker or Glass of Absinthe (L'Absinthe) can be seen at the Musée d'Orsay epitomising the popular view of absinthe addicts as sodden and benumbed, and Émile Zola described its effects in his novel L'Assommoir.

In 1905, Swiss farmer Jean Lanfray murdered his wife and two children and then attempted to kill himself after drinking absinthe. Lanfray had drunk a lot of wine and brandy before the killings, but that was overlooked or ignored, and blame for the murders was placed solely on his consumption of two glasses of absinthe. The Lanfray murders were the tipping point in this hotly debated topic, and a subsequent petition collected more than 82,000 signatures to ban it in Switzerland. A referendum was held on 5 July 1908. It was approved by voters, and the prohibition of absinthe was written into the Swiss constitution.

In 1906, Belgium and Brazil banned the sale and distribution of absinthe, though they were not the first countries to do so. It had been banned as early as 1898 in the colony of the Congo Free State. The Netherlands banned it in 1909, Switzerland in 1910, the United States in 1912, and France in 1914.

The prohibition of absinthe in France eventually boosted the popularity of pastis, and, to a lesser extent, ouzo and other anise-flavoured spirits that do not contain wormwood. Following the conclusion of the First World War, production of the Pernod Fils brand was resumed at the Banus distillery in Catalonia, Spain (where absinthe was still legal), but gradually declining sales saw the cessation of production in the 1960s. In Switzerland, the ban served only to drive the production of absinthe underground. Clandestine home distillers produced colourless absinthe (la Bleue), which was easier to conceal from the authorities. Many countries never banned absinthe, notably the United Kingdom, where it had never been as popular as in continental Europe.

=== Modern revival ===
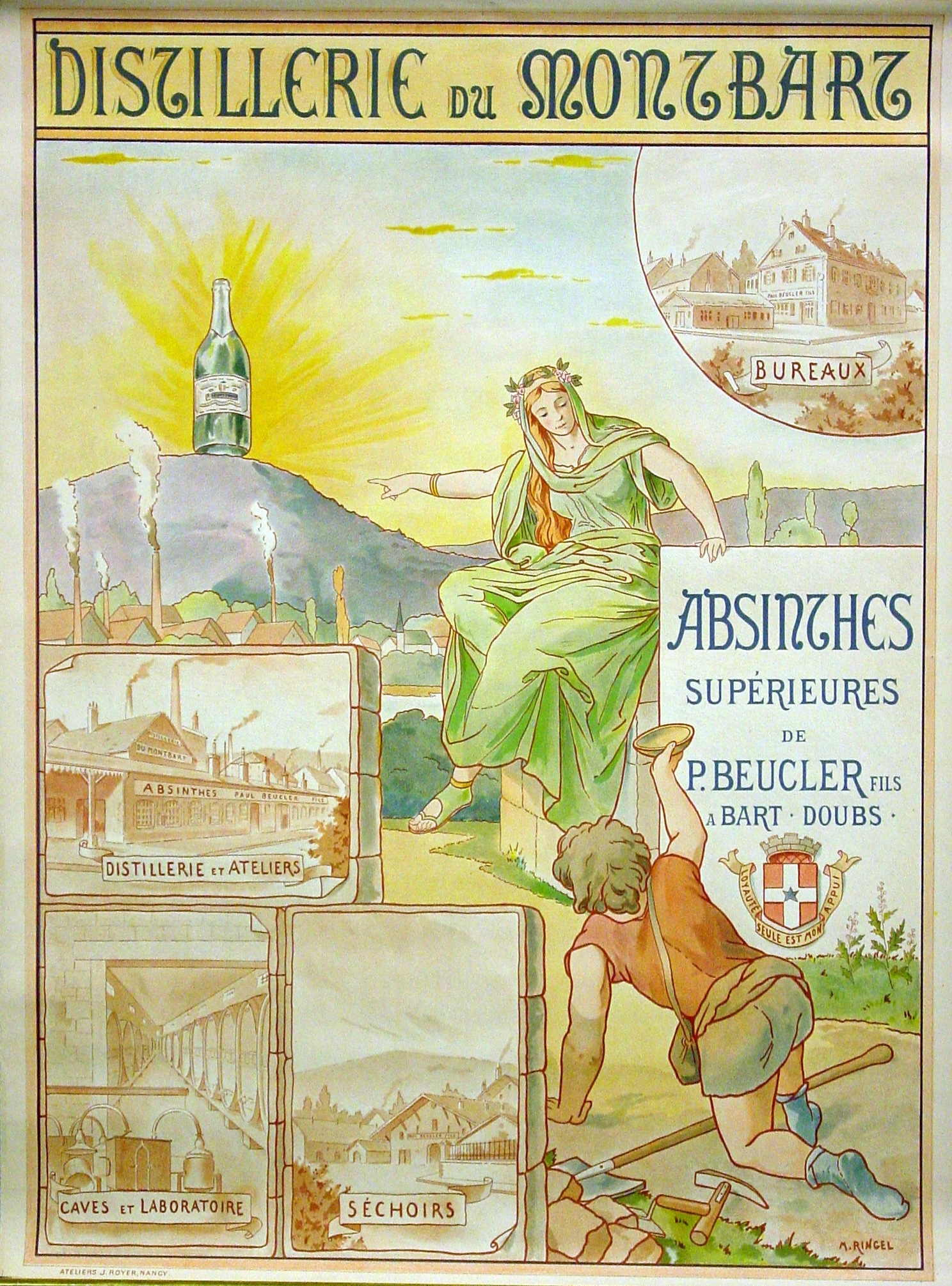
An advertising poster for Absinthe Beucler

British importer BBH Spirits began importing Hill's Absinth from the Czech Republic in the 1990s, as the UK had never formally banned it, sparking a modern resurgence in its popularity. It reappeared during a 1990s revival in countries where it was never banned. The forms available then were almost exclusively Czech, Spanish, and Portuguese brands of recent origin, typically Bohemian-style products. Connoisseurs considered them inferior and not representative of the 19th-century spirit. In 2000, La Fée Absinthe became the first commercial absinthe distilled and bottled in France since the 1914 ban, but it is now one of dozens of brands that are produced and sold within France.

In the Netherlands, Amsterdam wine seller Menno Boorsma challenged the restrictions in July 2004, confirming absinthe's legality once again. Similarly, Belgium lifted its long-standing ban on 1 January 2005, citing a conflict with the single European Market's adopted food and beverage regulations. In Switzerland, the constitutional ban was repealed in 2000 during a national constitutional overhaul, but the prohibition was instead written into ordinary law. That law was later repealed, and absinthe was made legal on March 1, 2005.

Spain never officially banned the drink, but it began to fall out of favour in the 1940s and nearly vanished into obscurity. Catalonia has seen a significant resurgence since 2007, when one producer established operations there. Absinthe has never been illegal to import or manufacture in Australia, although importation requires a permit under the Customs (Prohibited Imports) Regulation 1956 due to a restriction on importing any product containing oil of wormwood. In 2000, an amendment made all wormwood species prohibited herbs for food purposes under Food Standard 1.4.4. Prohibited and Restricted Plants and Fungi. However, this amendment was found inconsistent with other parts of the pre-existing Food Code, and it was withdrawn in 2002 during the transition between the two codes, thereby continuing to allow absinthe manufacture and importation through the existing permit-based system. The media erroneously reported these events as a reclassification from a prohibited product to a restricted product.

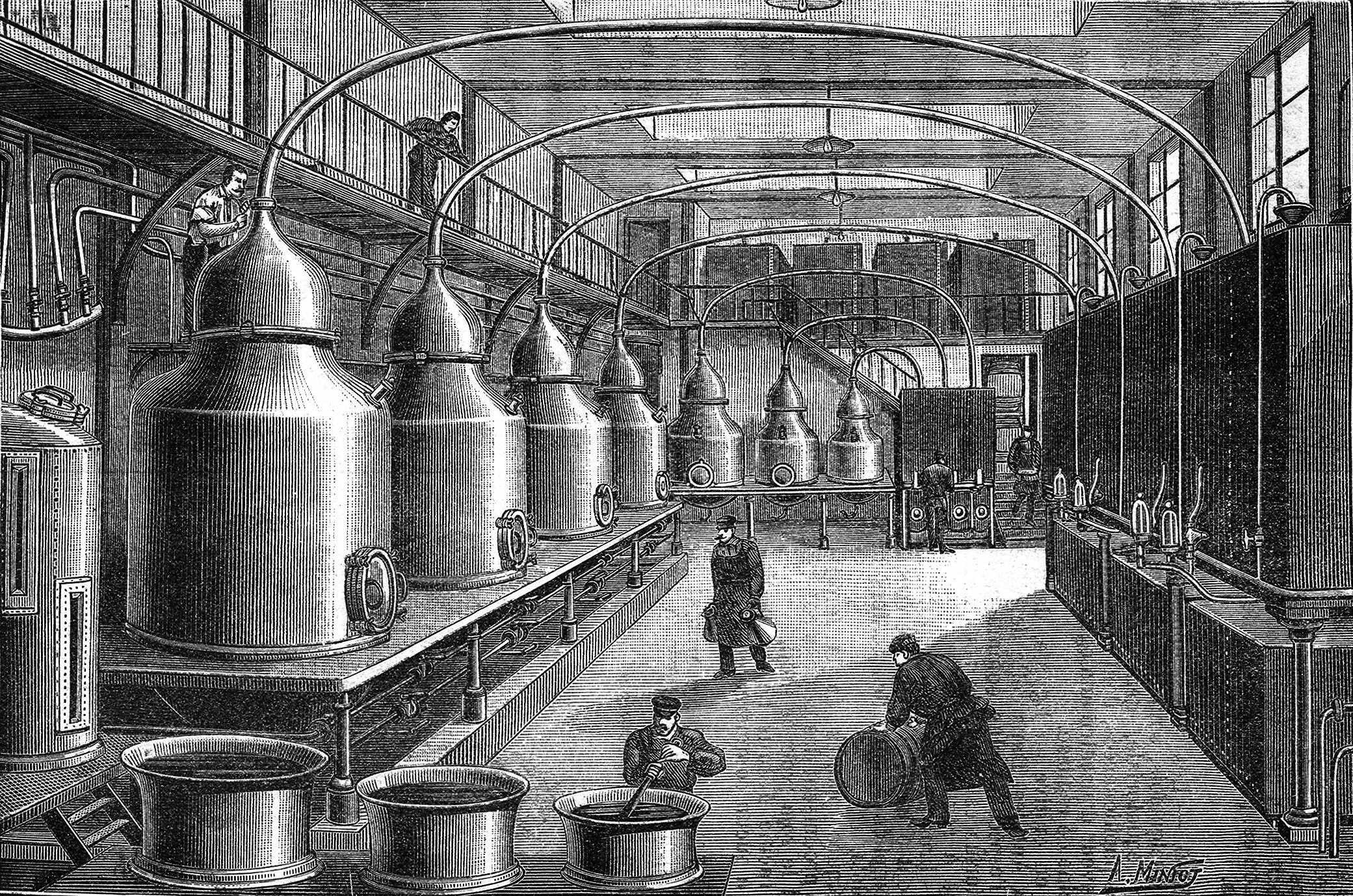
Absinthe distillation, c. 1904

In 2007, the French brand Lucid became the first genuine absinthe to receive a Certificate of Label Approval for import into the United States since 1912, following independent efforts by representatives from Lucid and Kübler to overturn the long-standing U.S. ban. In December 2007, St. George Absinthe Verte produced by St. George Spirits of Alameda, California became the first brand of American-made absinthe produced in the United States since the ban. Since that time, other micro-distilleries have started producing small batches in the United States.

The French Absinthe Ban of 1915 was repealed in May 2011 following petitions by the Fédération Française des Spiritueux, which represents French distillers, and the French Senate voted to repeal the prohibition in April 2011.

In Switzerland, the village of Môtiers, Val-de-Travers, near Neuchâtel, became the focal point for producing and promoting liquor after a nearly 100-year ban was lifted. The national Maison de l'Absinthe (House of Absinthe), with its attached museum, is located in the former courthouse where absinthe distillers were formerly prosecuted.

The 21st century has seen new types of absinthe, including various frozen preparations, that have become increasingly popular.

== Production ==
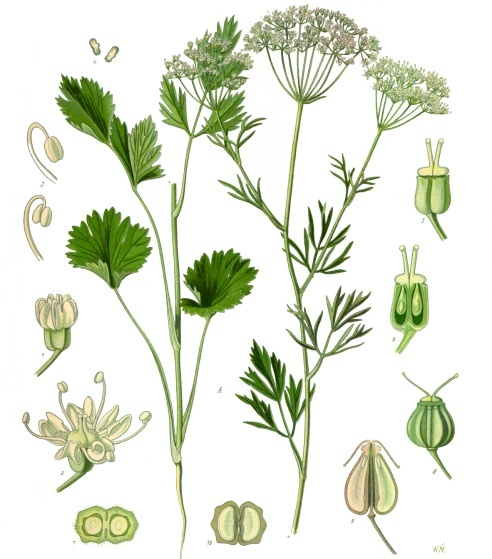
Green anise, one of three main herbs used in the production of absinthe

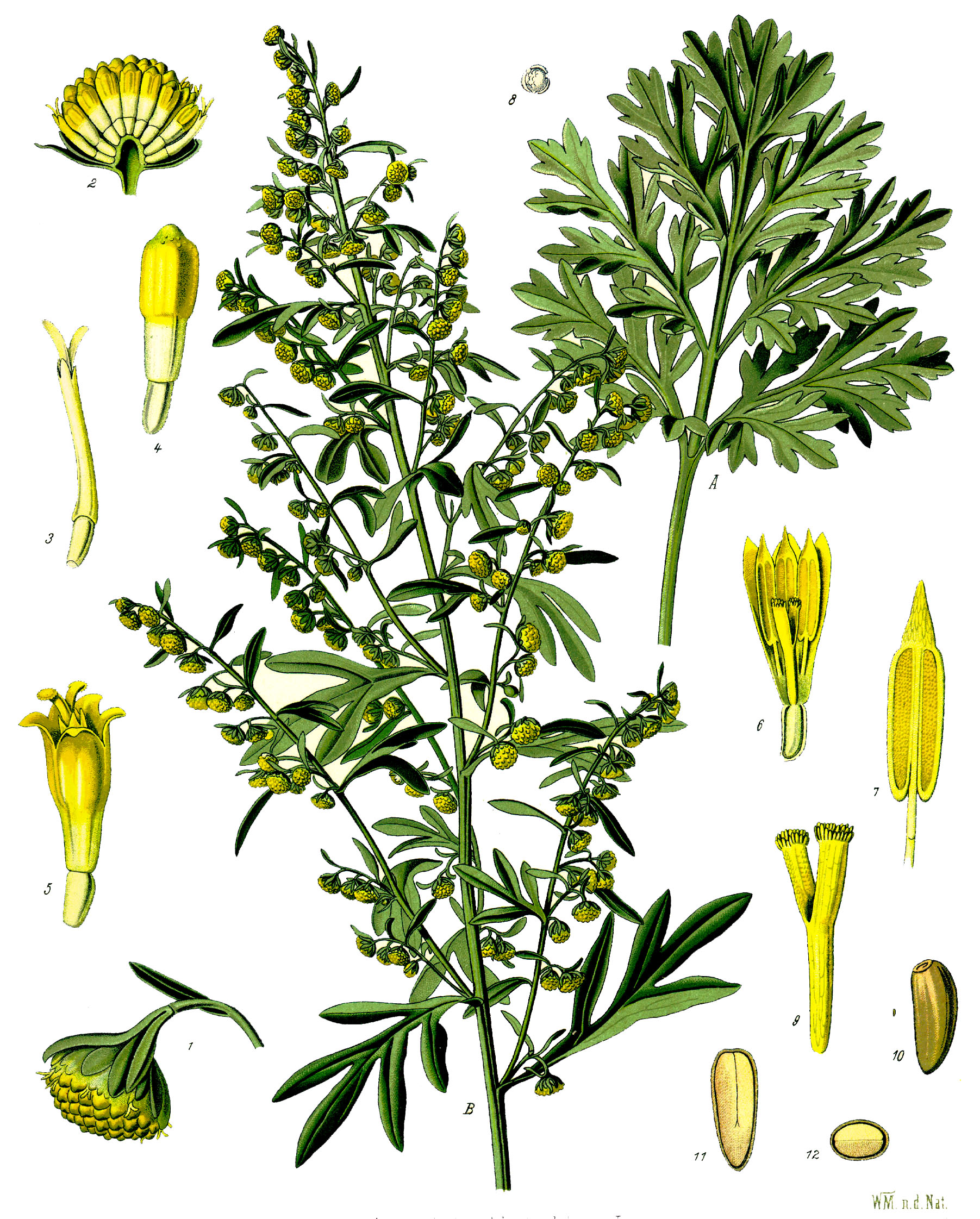
Grande wormwood

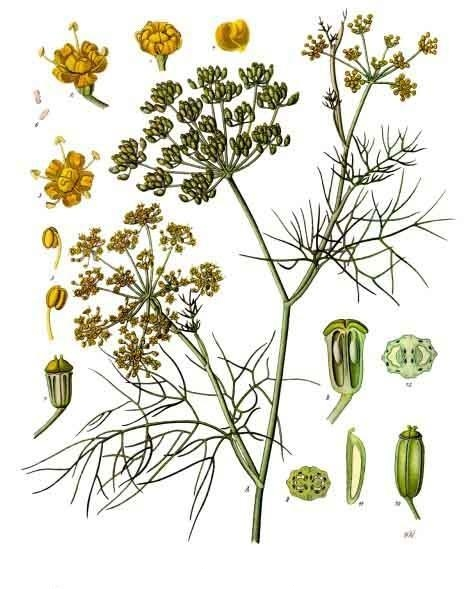
Sweet fennel

Most countries have no legal definition of absinthe, whereas production methods and contents for spirits such as whisky, brandy, and gin are defined and regulated globally. As a result, producers can label a product as "absinthe" or "absinth" without regard to any specific legal definition or quality standards.

Producers of legitimate absinthes use one of two historically defined processes to create the finished spirit: distillation or cold mixing. In the only country (Switzerland) that legally defines absinthe, distillation is the only permitted production method.

=== Distilled absinthe ===
Distilled absinthe uses a production method similar to that of high-quality gin. Distillers first macerate botanicals in distilled base alcohol, then redistill to remove bitter principles and impart the spirit's desired complexity and texture. The distillation of absinthe first yields a colourless distillate that leaves the alembic at around 72% ABV. The distiller may reduce and bottle the distillate clear to produce a Blanche or la Bleue absinthe, or colour it to create a verte using natural or artificial colouring.

Traditional absinthes get their green color strictly from the chlorophyll in whole herbs, extracted during the secondary maceration. This step involves steeping plants such as petite wormwood, hyssop, and melissa (among other herbs) in the distillate. These herbs extract chlorophyll, giving the drink its famous green color.

This step also adds the herbal complexity typical of high-quality absinthe. The natural coloring process is critical for absinthe ageing because chlorophyll remains chemically active. The chlorophyll serves a similar role in absinthe as tannins do in wine or brown liquors.

After colouring, the distiller dilutes the product with water to the desired alcohol percentage. Absinthe's flavour is said to improve materially with storage, and many distilleries, before the ban, aged their absinthe in settling tanks before bottling.

=== Cold mixed absinthe ===
Many modern absinthes are produced using a cold-mix process. This inexpensive method of production does not involve distillation, and is regarded as inferior for the same reasons that give cause for cheaply compounded gin to be legally differentiated from distilled gin. The cold mixing process involves the simple blending of flavouring essences and artificial colouring in commercial alcohol, in similar fashion to most flavoured vodkas and inexpensive liqueurs and cordials. Some modern cold-mixed absinthes have been bottled at strengths approaching 90% ABV. Others are presented as plain alcohol with a small amount of powdered herbs suspended in it.

The lack of a formal legal definition in most countries to regulate absinthe production and quality has enabled cheaply made products to be falsely presented as traditional in production and composition. In Switzerland, the only country with a formal legal definition of absinthe, any absinthe product not obtained by maceration and distillation or coloured artificially cannot be sold as absinthe.

=== Ingredients ===
Absinthe is traditionally made by distilling neutral alcohol with various herbs, spices, and water. Traditional absinthes were redistilled from a white grape spirit (or eau de vie), while lesser absinthes were more commonly made from grain, beet, or potato alcohol. The principal botanicals are grande wormwood, green anise, and florence fennel, which are often called "the holy trinity". Many other herbs may be used as well, such as petite wormwood (Artemisia pontica or Roman wormwood), hyssop, melissa, star anise, angelica, peppermint, coriander, and veronica.

One early recipe was included in 1864's The English and Australian Cookery Book. It directed the maker to "Take of the tops of wormwood, four pounds; root of angelica, calamus aromaticus, aniseed, leaves of dittany, of each one ounce; alcohol, four gallons. Macerate these substances during eight days, add a little water, and distil by a gentle fire, until two gallons are obtained. This is reduced to a proof spirit, and a few drops of the oil of aniseed added."

=== Alternative colouring ===
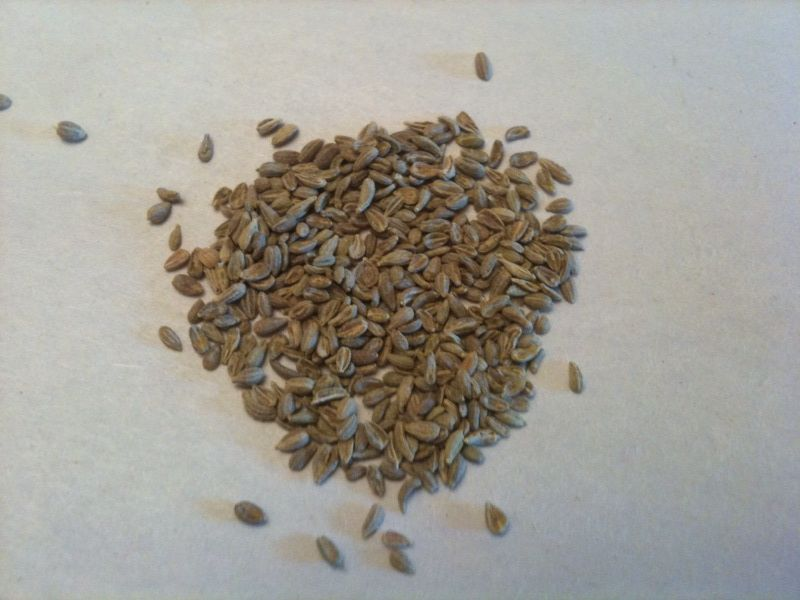
Anise seeds

Adding to absinthe's negative reputation in the late 19th and early 20th centuries, unscrupulous makers skipped the traditional colouring phase and instead added toxic copper salts to artificially create a green tint. This practice may be responsible for some of the alleged toxicity historically associated with this beverage. Many modern producers resort to other shortcuts, including artificial food coloring, to create the green color. Additionally, at least some cheap absinthes produced before the ban were reportedly adulterated with poisonous antimony trichloride, reputed to enhance the louching effect.

Absinthe may also be naturally coloured pink or red using rose or hibiscus flowers. This was referred to as a rose (pink) or rouge (red) absinthe. Only one historical brand of rose absinthe has been documented.

=== Bottled strength ===
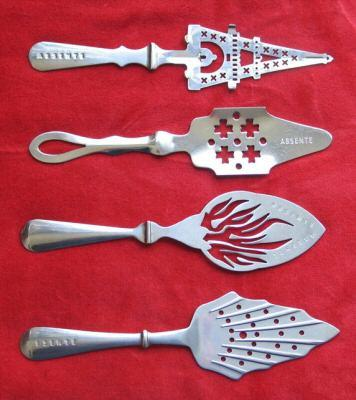
Absinthe spoons perch a sugar cube atop the glass, over which ice-cold water is dripped to dilute the absinthe. The lip near the centre of the handle lets the spoon rest securely on the rim of the glass.

Absinthe was historically bottled at 45–74% ABV. Some modern Franco–Suisse absinthes are bottled at up to 83% ABV, while some modern, cold-mixed bohemian-style absinthes are bottled at up to 89.9% ABV.

=== Kits ===
The modern-day interest in absinthe has spawned a rash of absinthe kits from sellers claiming they produce homemade absinthe. Kits often call for soaking herbs in vodka or other alcohol, or adding a liquid concentrate to vodka or other alcohol to create an ersatz absinthe. Such practices usually yield a harsh substance that bears little resemblance to the genuine article and is considered inauthentic by any practical standard. Some concoctions may even be dangerous, especially if they call for a potentially poisonous inclusion of herbs, oils, or extracts. In at least one documented case, a person suffered acute kidney injury after drinking 10 ml of pure wormwood oil.

=== Alternatives ===
In baking and in preparing the classic New Orleans-style Sazerac cocktail, anise-flavored liqueurs and pastis have often been used as a substitute if absinthe is unavailable.

== Preparation ==
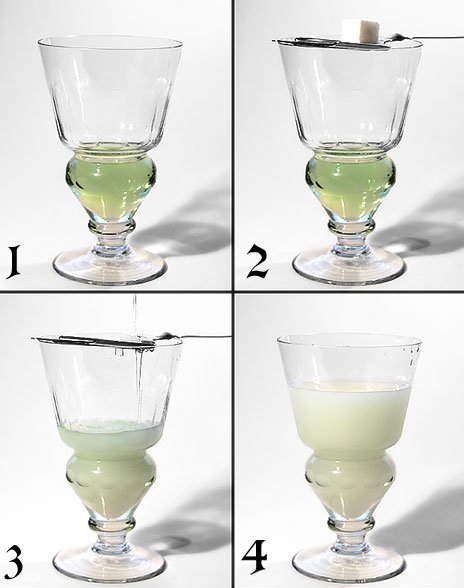
Preparing absinthe using the traditional method (that does not involve burning)

The traditional French preparation involves placing a sugar cube on a specially designed slotted spoon and setting the spoon on a glass filled with a measure of absinthe. Pour or drip iced water over the sugar cube to mix it into the absinthe. The final preparation contains 1 part absinthe and 3–5 parts water. As water dilutes the spirit, those components with poor water solubility (mainly those from anise, fennel, and star anise) come out of solution and cloud the drink. The resulting milky opalescence is called the louche (/luʃ/, French: 'opaque' or 'shady'). These dissolved essences release herbal aromas and flavours that "blossom" or "bloom", bringing out subtleties otherwise muted in the neat spirit. This reflects what is perhaps the oldest and purest method of preparation, and is often referred to as the French method.

The Bohemian method is a recent invention that uses fire and was not used during absinthe's peak popularity in the Belle Époque. Like the French method, a sugar cube is placed on a slotted spoon over a glass containing one shot of absinthe. The sugar soaks in alcohol (usually more absinthe), then the bartender sets it ablaze. The flaming sugar cube is then dropped into the glass, thus igniting the absinthe. Finally, a shot glass of water is added to douse the flames. This method tends to produce a stronger drink than the French method. A variant of the Bohemian method lets the fire extinguish on its own. This variant is sometimes called "cooking the absinthe" or "the flaming green fairy". This burning ritual may have originated with a coffee-and-brandy drink served at Café Brûlot, where a sugar cube soaked in brandy was set aflame. Most experienced absintheurs do not recommend the Bohemian Method and consider it a modern gimmick, as it can destroy the absinthe flavour and pose a fire hazard because of absinthe's unusually high alcohol content.

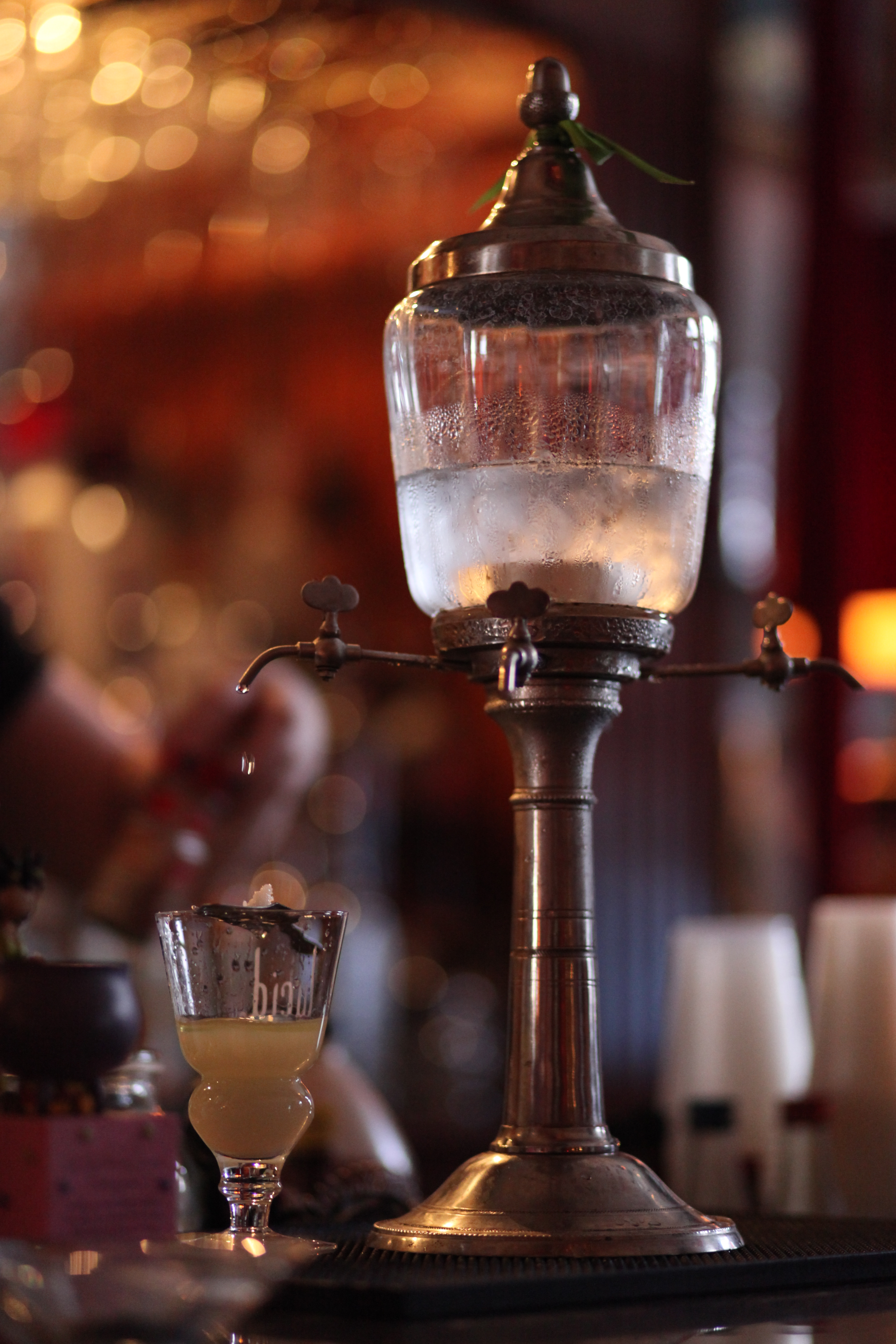
Slowly dripping ice water from an absinthe fountain

In 19th-century Parisian cafés, when a patron ordered absinthe, a waiter would present a dose in a suitable glass, along with sugar, an absinthe spoon, and a carafe of iced water. It was up to the patron to prepare the drink, as the inclusion or omission of sugar was strictly an individual preference, as was the amount of water used. As the drink grew popular, additional preparation accoutrements appeared, including the absinthe fountain, effectively a large jar of iced water with spigots mounted on a lamp base. This let drinkers prepare several drinks at once – and, with a hands-free drip, patrons could socialise while pouring a glass.

Although many bars served absinthe in standard glassware, several glasses were specifically designed for the French absinthe preparation ritual. Absinthe glasses typically featured a dose line, bulge, or bubble in the lower portion, indicating how much absinthe to pour. One "dose" of absinthe ranged anywhere around 2–2.5 fluid ounces (60–75 ml).

Beyond being made with sugar and water, absinthe became a popular cocktail ingredient in both the United Kingdom and the United States. By 1930, dozens of fancy cocktails that called for absinthe had been published in numerous credible bartender guides. One of the most famous of these libations is Ernest Hemingway's "Death in the Afternoon" cocktail, a tongue-in-cheek concoction that contributed to a 1935 collection of celebrity recipes. The directions are: "Pour one jigger absinthe into a Champagne glass. Add iced Champagne until it attains the proper opalescent milkiness. Drink three to five of these slowly."

== Styles ==
Most categories of alcoholic beverages have regulations governing their classification and labelling, while those governing absinthe have long been conspicuously lacking. According to popular 19th-century treatises, absinthe could be loosely categorised into several grades (ordinaire, demi-fine, fine, and Suisse – the latter does not denote origin), in order of increasing alcoholic strength and quality. Many contemporary absinthe critics classify absinthe as distilled or mixed based on its production method. While the former is generally considered far superior in quality to the latter, an absinthe's simple claim of being 'distilled' guarantees nothing about the quality of its base ingredients or the skill of its maker.

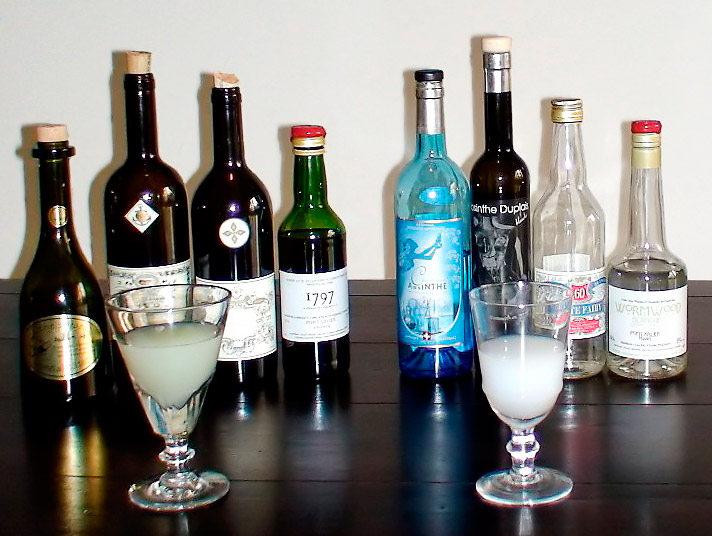
Modern Absinthes Vertes at left, blanches at right, and a prepared glass of each

- Blanche absinthe ("white" in French, also referred to as la Bleue in Switzerland) is bottled directly following distillation and reduction and is uncoloured (clear). Blanches tend to have a clean, smooth flavour with distinct tasting notes. The name la Bleue originally referred to Swiss bootleg absinthe, bottled colourless to look visually indistinct from other spirits during the era of absinthe prohibition, but it has become a popular term for post-ban Swiss-style absinthe in general. Blanches are often lower in alcohol content than vertes, though this is not always the case; the key difference is that blanches skip the secondary maceration stage and thus remain colourless like other distilled liquors.
- Verte absinthe ("green" in French, sometimes called la fée verte) begins as a blanche and is altered by a secondary maceration stage, in which a separate mixture of herbs is steeped into the clear distillate before bottling. This confers an intense, complex flavor as well as a peridot green hue. Vertes represent the prevailing type of absinthe that was found in the 19th century. Vertes are typically more alcoholic than blanches, as the high amounts of botanical oils added during secondary maceration remain miscible only at lower water concentrations; thus, vertes are usually bottled closer to still strength. Artificially colored green absinthes may also be called verte, though they lack the characteristic herbal flavors that result from maceration in whole herbs.
- Absenta ("absinthe" in Spanish) is sometimes associated with a regional style that often differed slightly from its French cousin. Traditional absentas may taste slightly different due to their use of Alicante anise, and often exhibit a characteristic citrus flavour.
- Hausgemacht (German for home-made, often abbreviated as HG) refers to clandestine absinthe (not to be confused with the Swiss La Clandestine brand) that is home-distilled by hobbyists. It should not be confused with absinthe kits. Hausgemacht absinthe is produced in small quantities for personal use, not for the commercial market. Clandestine production increased after absinthe was banned, when small producers went underground, most notably in Switzerland. Although Switzerland has lifted the ban, some clandestine distillers have not legitised their production. Authorities believe high alcohol taxes and the mystique of operating underground are likely reasons.

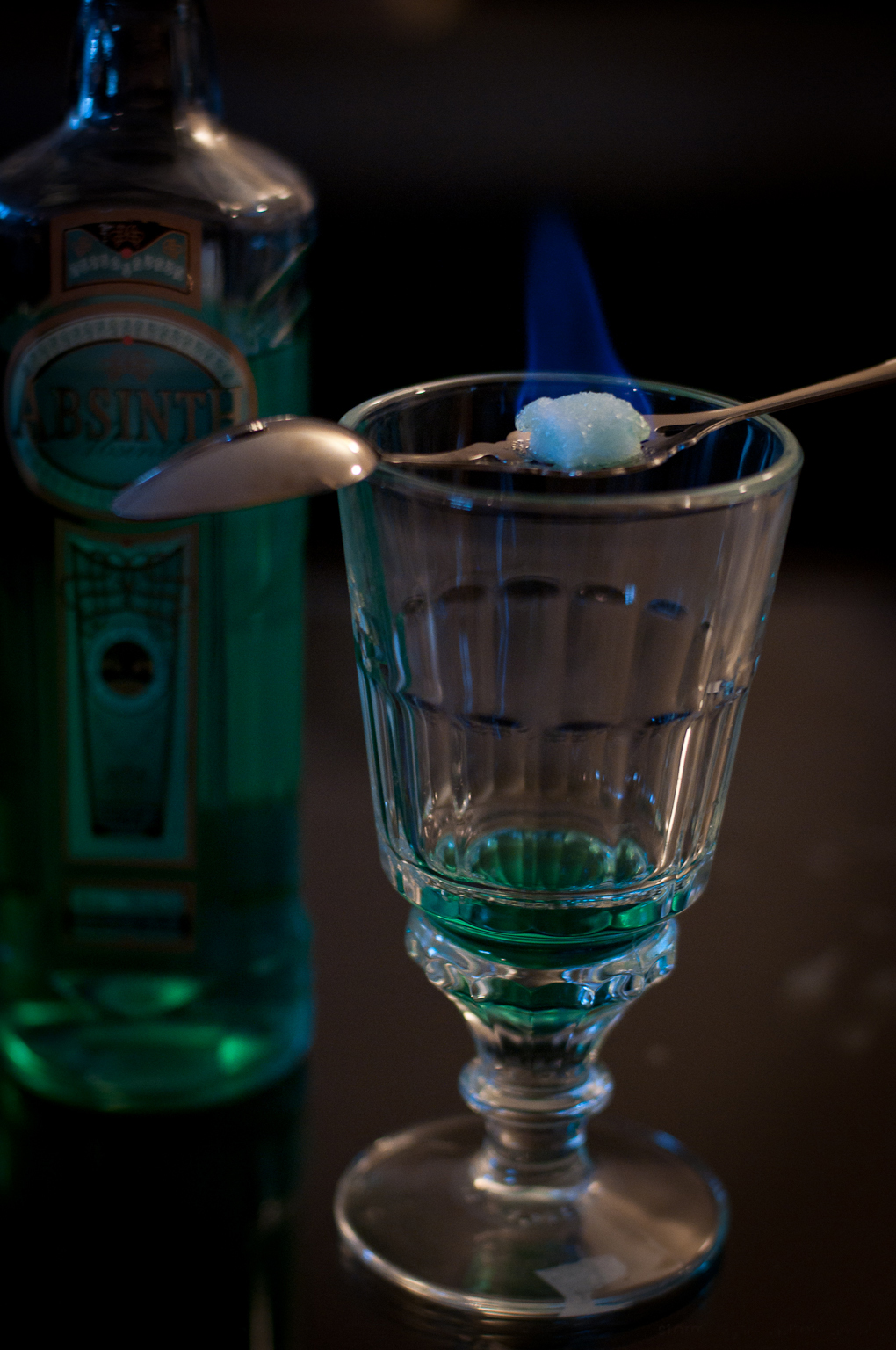
Burning sugar in a glass of Absinth Stromu, a Bohemian-style product. Note the strong artificial colouration.

- Bohemian-style absinth is also referred to as Czech-style absinthe, anise-free absinthe, or just "absinth" (without the "e"), and is best described as a wormwood bitter. It is produced mainly in the Czech Republic, from which it gets its designation as Bohemian or Czech, although not all absinthes from the Czech Republic are Bohemian-style. Bohemian-style absinthe typically contains little or none of the anise, fennel, and other herbal flavours associated with traditional absinthe, and thus bears very little resemblance to the absinthes made popular in the 19th century. Typical Bohemian-style absinthe has only two similarities with its authentic, traditional counterpart: it contains wormwood and has a high alcohol content. The Czechs are credited with inventing the fire ritual in the 1990s, possibly because Bohemian-style absinthe does not louche, which renders the traditional French preparation method useless. As such, this type of absinthe and its associated fire ritual are entirely modern fabrications and have little to no connection to the historical absinthe tradition.

== Storage ==
Artificially coloured or clear absinthe is aesthetically stable and can be bottled in clear glass. If naturally colored absinthe is exposed to light or air for a prolonged period, the chlorophyll gradually oxidizes, gradually changing the color from green to yellow-green, and eventually to brown. Historically, absinthe that had completed this transition was called feuille morte ("dead leaf"). In the pre-ban era, people viewed this natural phenomenon favourably, as it confirmed the product was coloured naturally, not artificially with potentially toxic chemicals. Predictably, vintage absinthes often emerge from sealed bottles with a distinct amber tint from decades of slow oxidation. Though this colour change does not affect the flavour of absinthe, most people prefer to preserve the original colour, so producers bottle naturally colored absinthe in dark, light-resistant bottles. Store absinthe intended for decades of storage in a cool (room temperature), dry place, away from light and heat. Do not store absinthe in the refrigerator or freezer, as anethole may polymerise inside the bottle, creating an irreversible precipitate and adversely affecting the original flavour.

== Health effects ==
Henri Privat-Livemont's 1896 poster

Absinthe has been frequently described in modern times as being hallucinogenic, a claim refuted by modern science. The belief that absinthe induces hallucinogenic effects is rooted, at least partly, in the findings of 19th-century French psychiatrist Valentin Magnan, who carried out ten years of experiments with wormwood oil. In the course of this research, he studied 250 cases of alcoholism and concluded that those who abused absinthe were worse off than those who abused other alcoholic drinks, experiencing rapid-onset hallucinations. Such accounts by opponents of absinthe (like Magnan) were cheerfully embraced by famous absinthe drinkers, many of whom were bohemian artists or writers.

Two famous artists helped popularise the notion that absinthe had powerful psychoactive properties: Toulouse-Lautrec and Vincent van Gogh. In one of the best-known written accounts of absinthe drinking, an inebriated Oscar Wilde described a phantom sensation of having tulips brush against his legs after leaving a bar at closing time.

Notions of absinthe's alleged hallucinogenic properties were again fuelled in the 1970s when a scientific paper suggested that thujone's structural similarity to tetrahydrocannabinol (THC), the active chemical in cannabis, presented the possibility of THC receptor affinity. Counterevidence to this was published in 1999.

The debate over whether absinthe produces effects on the human mind in addition to those of alcohol has not been resolved conclusively. The effects of absinthe have been described by some as mind-opening. The most commonly reported experience is a "clear-headed" feeling of inebriation – a form of "lucid drunkenness". Chemist, historian, and absinthe distiller Ted Breaux claims that absinthe's alleged secondary effects may stem from herbal compounds that act as stimulants while others act as sedatives, creating an overall lucid, awakening effect. The long-term effects of moderate absinthe consumption in humans remain unknown, although herbs traditionally used to produce absinthe are reported to have both painkilling and antiparasitic properties.

Today it is known that absinthe does not cause hallucinations. It is widely accepted that reports of hallucinogenic effects resulting from absinthe consumption were attributable to the poisonous adulterants being added to cheaper versions of the drink in the 19th century, such as oil of wormwood, impure alcohol (contaminated possibly with methanol), and poisonous colouring matter – notably (among other green copper salts) cupric acetate and antimony trichloride (the last-named being used to fake the ouzo effect).

=== Controversy ===
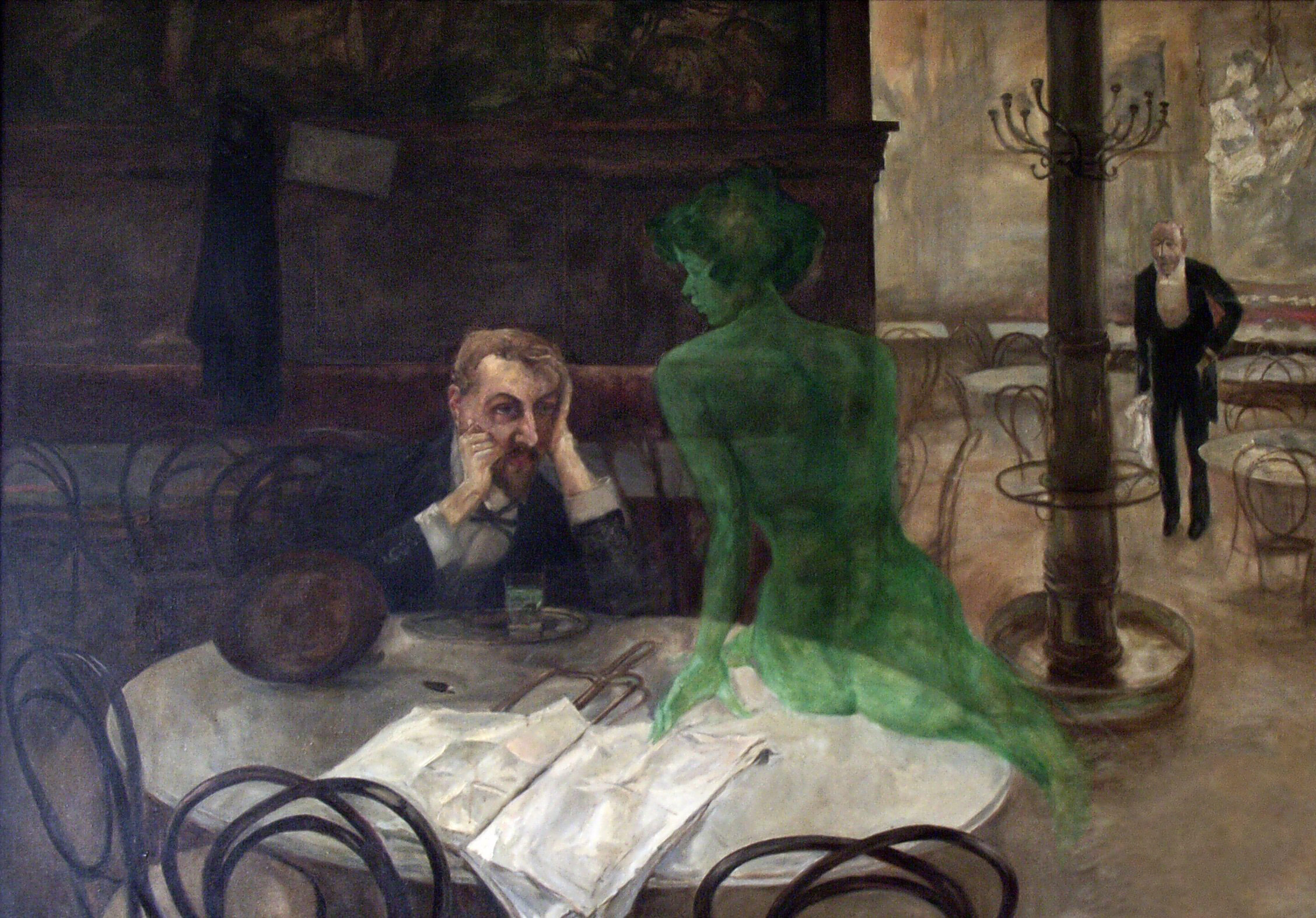
The Absinthe Drinker by Viktor Oliva (1861–1928)

It was once widely promoted that excessive absinthe drinking caused effects that were discernible from those associated with alcoholism, a belief that led to the coining of the term absinthism. One of the first vilifications of absinthe followed an 1864 experiment in which Magnan simultaneously exposed one guinea pig to large doses of pure wormwood vapour, and another to alcohol vapours. The guinea pig exposed to wormwood vapour experienced convulsive seizures, while the animal exposed to alcohol did not. Magnan would later blame the naturally occurring (in wormwood) chemical thujone for these effects.

Thujone, once widely believed to be an active chemical in absinthe, is a GABA antagonist, and while it can produce muscle spasms in large doses, there is no direct evidence to suggest it causes hallucinations. Past reports estimated thujone concentrations in absinthe as being up to 260 mg/kg. More recently, published scientific analyses of samples of various original absinthes have disproved previous estimates and demonstrated that only a trace of the thujone present in wormwood actually makes it into a properly distilled absinthe when historical methods and materials are employed to create the spirit. As such, most traditionally crafted absinthes, both vintage and modern, meet current EU standards.

Tests conducted on mice to study toxicity showed an oral LD_{50} of about 45 mg thujone per kg of body weight, which represents far more absinthe than could be realistically consumed. The high percentage of alcohol in absinthe would result in mortality long before thujone could become a factor. In documented cases of acute thujone poisoning as a result of oral ingestion, the source of thujone was not commercial absinthe, but rather non-absinthe-related sources, such as common essential oils (which may contain as much as 50% thujone).

One study published in the Journal of Studies on Alcohol concluded that high doses (0.28 mg/kg) of thujone in alcohol had negative effects on attention performance in a clinical setting. It delayed reaction time and caused subjects to concentrate their attention on the central field of vision. Low doses (0.028 mg/kg) did not produce an effect noticeably different from the plain alcohol control. Although the high-dose samples were statistically significant in a double blind test, subjects could not reliably identify which samples contained thujone. For the average 65 kg (143 lb) man, the high-dose samples in the study would equate to 18.2 mg of thujone. The EU limit of 35 mg/L of thujone in absinthe means that, given the highest permitted thujone content, that individual would need to consume approximately 0.5 litres of high-proof (e.g., 50%+ ABV) spirit before the thujone could be metabolized to display effects detectable in a clinical setting, which would result in a potentially lethal BAC of >0.4%.

== Regulations ==
Most countries (except Switzerland) currently lack a legal definition of absinthe (unlike Scotch whisky or cognac). Accordingly, producers are free to label a product "absinthe" or "absinth", whether or not it bears any resemblance to the traditional spirit.

=== Australia ===
Absinthe is readily available in many bottle shops. Bitters may contain a maximum 35 mg/kg thujone, while other alcoholic beverages can contain a maximum 10 mg/kg. State licensing laws regulate the domestic production and sale of absinthe.

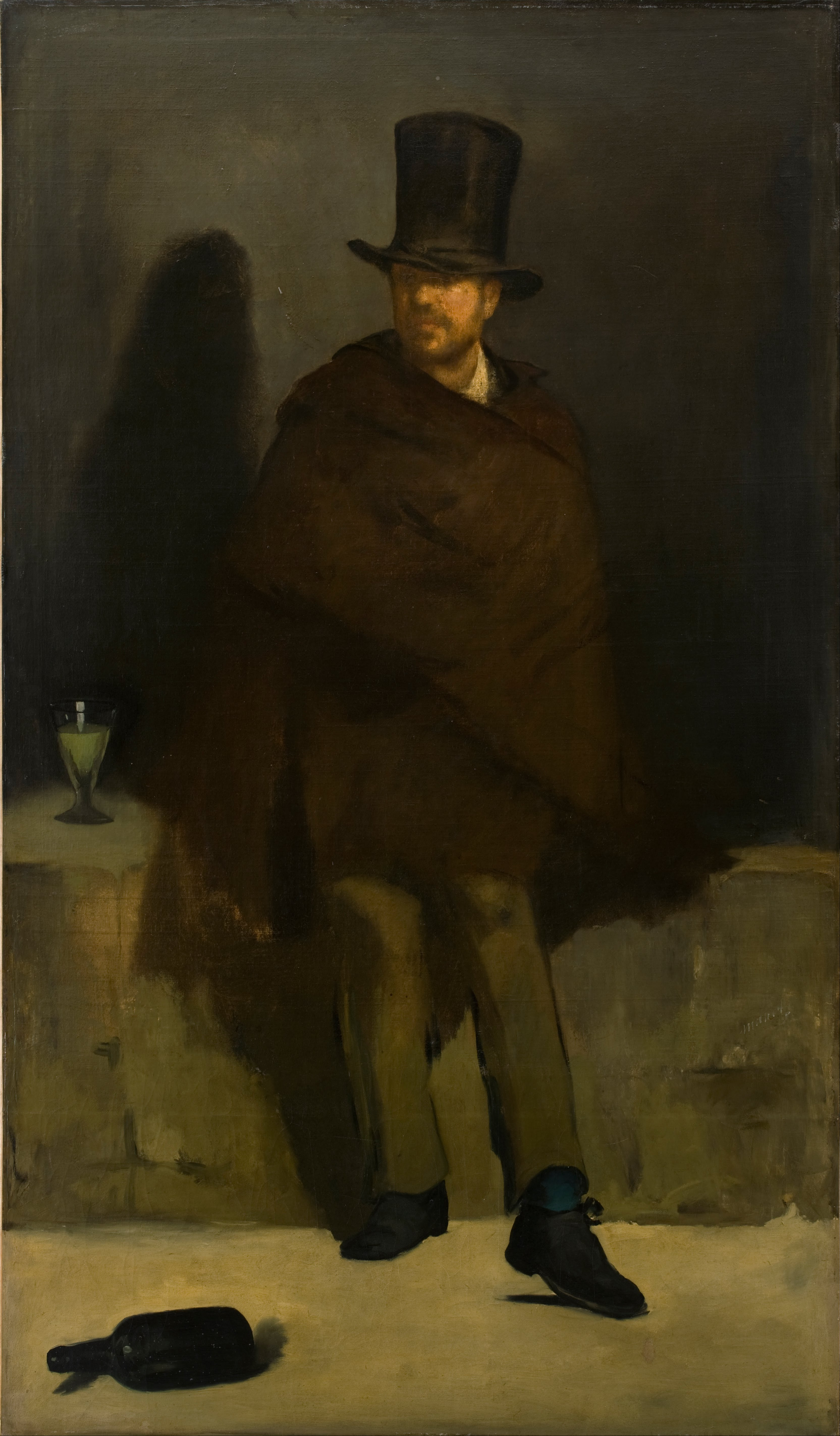
Édouard Manet, The Absinthe Drinker, c. 1859

Until 13 July 2013, the import and sale of absinthe technically required a special permit, since "oil of wormwood, being an essential oil obtained from plants of the genus Artemisia, and preparations containing oil of wormwood" were listed as item 12A, Schedule 8, Regulation 5H of the Customs (Prohibited Imports) Regulations 1956 (Cth). These controls have now been repealed, and permission is no longer required.

=== Brazil ===
Brazil banned absinthe until 1999, when entrepreneur Lalo Zanini brought it in, and it was legalised the same year. Presently, absinthe sold in Brazil must abide by the national law that restricts all spirits to a maximum of 54% ABV. While this regulation is enforced throughout channels of legal distribution, it may be possible to find absinthe containing alcohol in excess of the legal limit in some restaurants or food fairs.

=== Canada ===
In Canada, liquor laws concerning the production, distribution, and sale of spirits are written and enforced by individual provincial government monopolies. Each product must be approved by the province's liquor board before it can be sold there. Importation is a federal matter and is enforced by the Canada Border Services Agency. Individuals may import a nominal amount of liquor for personal use, provided they meet conditions related to their duration of stay outside the country.

- British Columbia, New Brunswick: no established limits on thujone content
- Alberta, Ontario: 10 mg/kg
- Manitoba: 6–8 mg
- Quebec: 15 mg/kg
- Newfoundland and Labrador: absinthe sold in provincial liquor store outlets
- Nova Scotia: absinthe sold in provincial liquor store outlets
- Prince Edward Island: absinthe is not sold in provincial liquor store outlets, but one brand (Deep Roots) produced on the island can be procured locally.
- Saskatchewan: Only one brand is listed in provincial liquor stores, although an individual is permitted to import one case (usually twelve 750 ml bottles or eight one-litre bottles) of any liquor.
- Ontario: 3 brands of absinthe are listed for sale on the website of the Liquor Control Board of Ontario

In 2007, Canada's first genuine absinthe (Taboo Absinthe) was created by Okanagan Spirits Craft Distillery in British Columbia.

=== European Union ===
The European Union permits a maximum thujone level of 35 mg/kg in alcoholic beverages where Artemisia species is a listed ingredient, and 10 mg/kg in other alcoholic beverages. Member countries regulate absinthe production within this framework. The sale of absinthe is permitted in all EU countries unless they further regulate it.

=== Finland ===
Finland prohibited the sale and production of alcohol from 1919 to 1932; it has no current prohibition on absinthe. The government-owned chain of liquor stores (Alko) is the only outlet that may sell alcoholic beverages containing over 8% ABV, although national law bans the sale of alcoholic beverages containing over 80% ABV.

=== France ===
Pablo Picasso, 1901–02, Femme au café (Woman at the Café, but usually titled Absinthe Drinker in English), oil on canvas, 73 cm × 54 cm (29 in × 21 in), Hermitage Museum, Saint Petersburg, Russia

Édouard Manet's first major painting The Absinthe Drinker was controversial, and was rejected by the Paris Salon in 1859. Despite adopting sweeping EU food and beverage regulations in 1988 that effectively re-legalised absinthe, a decree was passed that same year that preserved the prohibition on products explicitly labelled as "absinthe", while placing strict limits on fenchone (fennel) and pinocamphone (hyssop) in an obvious, but failed, attempt to thwart a possible return of absinthe-like products. French producers circumvented this regulatory obstacle by labelling absinthe as spiritueux à base de plantes d'absinthe ('wormwood-based spirits'), with many reducing or omitting fennel and hyssop altogether. A legal challenge to the scientific basis of this decree resulted in its repeal (2009), which opened the door for the official French re-legalisation of absinthe for the first time since 1915. The French Senate voted to repeal the prohibition in mid-April 2011.

=== Germany ===
Germany enacted a ban on absinthe on 27 March 1923. In addition to banning the production and commercial trade in absinthe, the law also prohibited the distribution of printed matter that detailed its production. The original ban was lifted in 1981, but using Artemisia absinthium as a flavouring agent remained prohibited. On 27 September 1991, Germany adopted the European Community's 1988 standards, which effectively re-legalised absinthe.

=== Italy ===
In 1926, the Fascist regime banned the production, import, transport, and sale of any liquor named Assenzio. The ban was reinforced in 1931 with harsher penalties for transgressors and remained in force until 1992, when the Italian government amended its laws to comply with the EU directive 88/388/EEC.

=== New Zealand ===
Although absinthe is not prohibited nationally, some local authorities have banned it. The latest is Mataura in Southland. The ban came in August 2008 after several misuse incidents drew public and police attention. One incident resulted in breathing difficulties and the hospitalisation of a 17-year-old for alcohol poisoning. The particular brand of absinthe that caused these effects was bottled at 89% ABV.

=== Sweden and Norway ===
Sweden and Norway have never prohibited the sale and production of absinthe. However, only the government-owned chain of liquor stores known as Systembolaget in Sweden and Vinmonopolet in Norway may sell alcoholic beverages containing more than 3.5% ABV in Sweden and 4.75% ABV in Norway. Systembolaget and Vinmonopolet did not import or sell absinthe for many years after the ban in France; however, today several absinthes are available for purchase in Systembolaget stores, including Swedish made distilled absinthe. In Norway, however, you are less likely to find absinthe because Norwegian alcohol law prohibits selling and importing alcoholic beverages above 60% ABV, which eliminates most absinthes.

=== Switzerland ===
In Switzerland, the sale and production of absinthe was prohibited from 1910 to 1 March 2005. This was based on a vote in 1908, inspired by the Jean Lanfray incident. To be legally made or sold in Switzerland, absinthe must be distilled, must not contain certain additives, and must be either naturally coloured or left uncoloured.

In 2014, the Federal Administrative Court of Switzerland invalidated a 2010 government decision that allowed only absinthe made in the Val-de-Travers region to be labelled as absinthe in Switzerland. The court found that absinthe was a product label and not tied to a geographic origin.

=== United Kingdom ===
Absinthe was never legally prohibited in the UK, but it was not imported for 70 years.

=== United States ===
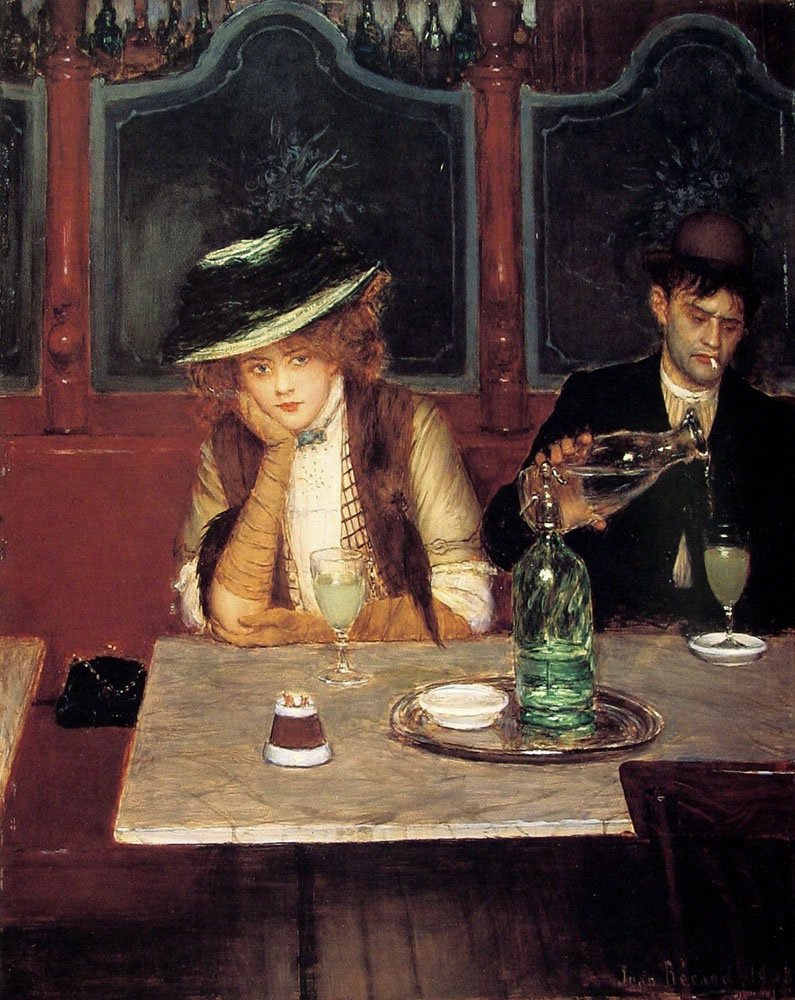
The Drinkers by Jean Béraud (1908)

In 2007, the Alcohol and Tobacco Tax and Trade Bureau (TTB) effectively lifted the long-standing absinthe ban, and it has since approved many brands for sale in the US market. This was made possible in part by the TTB's clarification of the Food and Drug Administration's (FDA) thujone content regulations, which specify that finished food and beverages containing Artemisia species must be thujone-free. In this context, the TTB considers a product thujone-free if the thujone content is less than 10 ppm (equal to 10 mg/kg). This is verified through the use of gas chromatography–mass spectrometry. The brands Kübler and Lucid and their lawyers did most of the work to get absinthe legalized in the U.S., over the 2004–2007 time period. In the U.S., 5 March is sometimes referred to as "National Absinthe Day", as it was the day the 95-year ban on absinthe was finally lifted.

The import, distribution, and sale of absinthe are permitted subject to the following restrictions:

- The product must be thujone-free as per TTB guidelines,
- The word "absinthe" can neither be the brand name nor stand alone on the label, and
- The packaging cannot "project images of hallucinogenic, psychotropic, or mind-altering effects".

Absinthe imported in violation of these regulations is subject to seizure at the discretion of U.S. Customs and Border Protection.

=== Vanuatu ===
The Absinthe (Prohibition) Act 1915, passed in the New Hebrides, has never been repealed, is included in the 2006 Vanuatu consolidated legislation, and contains the following all-encompassing restriction: "The manufacture, importation, circulation and sale wholesale or by retail of absinthe or similar liquors in Vanuatu shall be prohibited."

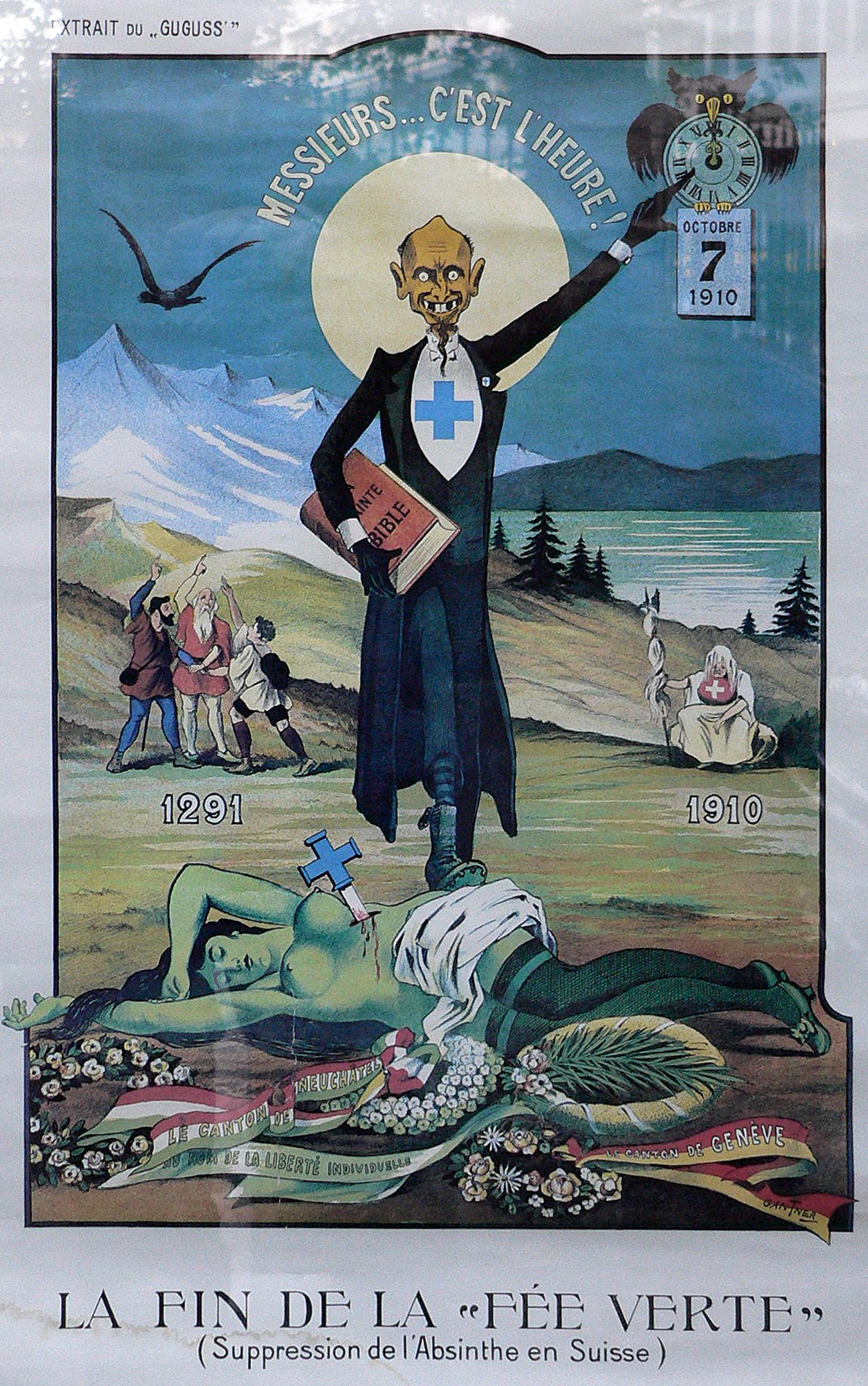
La fin de la fée verte ("The End of the Green Fairy"): Swiss poster criticizing the country's prohibition of absinthe in 1910

== Cultural influence ==
Many artists and writers in late 19th- and early 20th-century France were noted absinthe drinkers and featured absinthe in their work. Some of these included Édouard Manet, Guy de Maupassant, Paul Verlaine, Amedeo Modigliani, Edgar Degas, Henri de Toulouse-Lautrec, Vincent van Gogh, Oscar Wilde, Arthur Rimbaud, and Émile Zola. Many other renowned artists and writers similarly drew from this cultural well, including Aleister Crowley, Ernest Hemingway, Pablo Picasso, August Strindberg, and Erik Satie.

The aura of illicitness and mystery surrounding absinthe has played into literature, movies, music, and television, where it is often portrayed as a mysterious, addictive, and mind-altering drink. Marie Corelli's Wormwood: A Drama of Paris (1890) was a popular novel about a Frenchman driven to murder and ruin after being introduced to absinthe. Intended as a morality tale on the dangers of the drink, it was speculated to have contributed to subsequent bans of absinthe in Europe and the United States. Some of the earliest film references include The Hasher's Delirium (1910) by Émile Cohl, an early pioneer in the art of animation, as well as two different silent films, each titled Absinthe, from 1913 and 1914 respectively. More recently, it served as the title of a 2018 song by the indie group I Don't Know How But They Found Me.

== See also ==
- List of alcoholic drinks
