= Lucidity =

Lucidity may refer to:

- Lucidity (album), a 2006 album by Delain
- Lucidity (festival), a music festival in Southern California
- "Lucidity" (song), a 2010 song by Tame Impala
- Lucidity (video game), a 2009 puzzle-platform game
- Lucidity (web series), a 2010 web series about lucid dreaming

== See also ==
- Lucid (disambiguation)
- Lucid dream
