= Lucid Absinthe =

French absinthe

Lucid Absinthe Supérieure
- Type: Spirit, specifically Absinthe
- Manufacturer: Hood River Distillers
- Origin: France
- Introduced: 2007 (United States)
- Alcohol by volume: 62.0%
- Proof (US): 124
- Colour: Green
- Ingredients: Grande wormwood, Fennel, Sweet anise

Lucid Absinthe Supérieure is the first absinthe made with Grande Wormwood to be legally available in the United States after the repeal of the 95-year ban.

Lucid is distilled in accordance with traditional French methods in the historic Combier Distillery in Loire Valley, France, which was founded in 1834 and designed by Gustave Eiffel. Lucid is distilled entirely from spirits and European whole herbs and uses no artificial additives, oils, or dyes.

== History ==
Allegedly created as an elixir in the 1790s by Dr. Pierre Ordinaire of Switzerland, absinthe became so popular in bars, bistros, cafés, and cabarets that, by the 1860s, the 5 p.m. happy hour was called l'heure verte ("the green hour"). By 1910, the French were drinking 36 million liters of absinthe per year, as compared to their annual consumption of almost 5 billion liters of wine. As a result, the winemakers association, among other groups, began a campaign of misinformation that tied consuming absinthe to claims of insanity, criminal activity and hallucinations – all designed to discourage consumption. These claims were aided by the fact that unlike Cognac, champagne, etc., there was no law that defined absinthe – nothing to regulate the production and quality. In 1912, the U.S. Department of Agriculture banned absinthe in the United States, and it was banned in France a few years later.

After 95 years of prohibition, genuine absinthe was re-authorized for sale in the United States with the approval of Lucid in 2007. Lucid creator and scientist T.A. Breaux negotiated its legality with the U.S. government on the basis that Lucid was created from absinthe-making techniques used over a century ago. The result was not only a genuine, historically accurate product, but one that met all requirements of the U.S. Alcohol and Tobacco Tax and Trade Bureau, including a stipulation that any finished food or beverage should test less than 10ppm or 10 mg/kg for Thujone pursuant to 21 CFR 172.510, which is well under the 35 mg/kg content that is legal within the European Union. The Lucid brand revived the antique term "Absinthe Supérieure" to differentiate itself from the negative connotations of absinthe that persisted in the Alcohol and Tobacco Tax and Trade Bureau.

Lucid was granted a COLA (Certificate of Label Approval) in the United States on 5 March 2007, making it the first genuine absinthe to gain approval for legal distribution in the U.S. since 1912.

Lucid was produced for Viridian Spirits, LLC, New York before being sold to Hood River Distillers in 2013.

== Botanicals used ==
Lucid is distilled entirely from all natural ingredients and is the first genuine absinthe distilled with real Grande Wormwood (Artemisia absinthium) available in the United States for more than 95 years. Lucid is made with historically accurate volumes of Grande Wormwood, as well as other botanicals, such as green anise and sweet fennel that are traditional to the spirit. The recipe was developed by T.A. Breaux, an absinthe expert and historian. Lucid's green color is derived directly from the botanicals, without any artificial coloring added, which is a key feature of genuine absinthe. Lucid's natural color requires a dark bottle because exposure to light will cause the natural color to fade, which explains why so many traditional absinthes were bottled in dark glass.

== Taste profile ==
Lucid is characterized by upfront flavors of anise and fennel, followed by mild mid-palate earthy textures attributable to the absinthe (Artemisia absinthium). The herbs round out the flavor with additional spice and grassy notes, which linger in a moderately long finish.

Lucid is 124 proof, or 62% ABV.
