= Hood River Distillers =

Coordinates: 45°42′48″N 121°31′04″W

- Company type: Liquor
- Industry: Beverage
- Founded: 1934
- Headquarters: Hood River, Oregon

Hood River Distillers is an importer, producer, bottler, and marketer of spirits based in the U.S. State of Oregon.

== History ==
Established in 1934 in Hood River, Oregon by Ted Pooley and Ned Marshall, Hood River Distillers received the first state distiller's license (DSP-OR-1) and began by making fruit wine and brandy from the excess production of apples, pears and berries from the Hood River Valley's harvests.

Hood River Distillers has been at its current bottling facility in Hood River since 1968. The facility is located along the Columbia River. The company has expanded the plant for storage and made production line upgrades several times throughout the years.

Although its core distribution began in the Pacific Northwest, Hood River Distillers currently produces over one million cases per year, and distributes its products throughout the United States. Hood River Distillers is a member of the Century Council. The company bought Portland-based Clear Creek Distillery in 2014.

== See also ==
- Alcoholic beverages in Oregon
