= Bohemian-style absinth =

Czech style of wormwood bitters related to absinthe

Bohemian-style or Czech-style absinth (also called anise-free absinthe or absinth) is a Bohemian version of the traditional spirit absinthe, though it is more accurately described as a kind of wormwood bitters. It is produced mainly in the Czech Republic, from which it gets its designations as “Bohemian” or “Czech,” although not all absinthe from the Czech Republic is Bohemian-style.

Typical Bohemian-style absinth has only two similarities with its traditional French or Swiss counterpart, in that it contains wormwood and has a high alcohol content.

Since few countries possess a legal definition for absinthe, producers of Czech style absinth have taken advantage of this situation by borrowing the romantic Belle Époque associations and psychoactive reputation of traditional absinthe to create a market for their dissimilar products. Many of these producers aim to increase the appeal of their wares by making claims as to the thujone content of their absinth, levels which are uncharacteristic of "pre-ban" absinthe. A few Czech products even claim to have levels of thujone that would render them unfit to be sold in many parts of the world.

== The “fire ritual” ==
Bohemian-style absinth lacks much of the herbal profile and density of authentic absinthe, including the constituents that create the louche. Since this renders Czech style absinth unusable for the traditional method of preparation, a modern ritual involving fire was created. In the “fire ritual,” absinth is poured into a glass, and a sugar cube on a slotted spoon is placed over the glass. The sugar cube is then soaked with absinth and is set on fire. The cube is then dropped into the absinth, setting it ablaze. Then water is poured over the flame until it goes out. Usually, a 1:1 ratio of water to absinth is used. This procedure produces a minor simulation of the louche that is seen in traditional absinthe, and the low water-to-alcohol ratio increases the strength of the resulting drink. (A traditional absinthe drink is diluted with water to a ratio between 3:1 and 5:1.) Many Czechs do not dilute the drink at all.

The fire ritual first appeared in advertisements after having been seen in a Prague bar in the late 1990s. It has been mistaken at times as historical fact due to its having been misrepresented as such in several contemporary costume drama films.
