= Carafe =

Container used for serving wine and other drinks

A glass carafe

A carafe (/kəˈræf/) is a glass container with a flared lip used for serving liquids, especially wine and coffee. Unlike the related decanter, carafes generally do not include stoppers. Coffee pots included in coffee makers are also referred to as carafes in American English.

== Etymology ==
It derives from French carafe, in turn from Arabic gharafa (Arabic: غَرَفَة, romanized: gharafa) or Persian qarraba, which is a big flagon for wine or other liquids.

== Usage ==
In France, carafes are commonly used to serve water. To order a carafe d'eau ("carafe of water") is to request to be served free tap water rather than bottled water at a cost. In Greece, in tavernas or similar establishments, carafes are normally used to serve draught wine. Carafes are also used to serve coffee; these carafes come in glass or thermal variants used for certain purposes, such as storing larger amounts of coffee without affecting the flavour or keeping the coffee warm for extended periods.

== See also ==
- Wine accessory
- Wine tasting
