= Ouzo effect =

Phenomenon observed in drink mixing

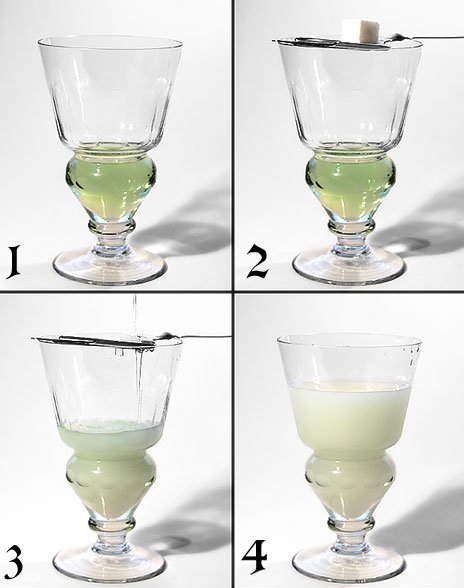
The ouzo effect during the preparation of absinthe

The ouzo effect (/ˈuːzoʊ/ OO-zoh), also known as the louche effect (/luːʃ/ LOOSH) and spontaneous emulsification, is the phenomenon of formation of a milky oil-in-water emulsion when water is added to ouzo and other anise-flavored liqueurs and spirits, such as pastis, rakı, arak, sambuca and absinthe. Such emulsions occur with only minimal mixing and are highly stable.

== Observation and explanation ==
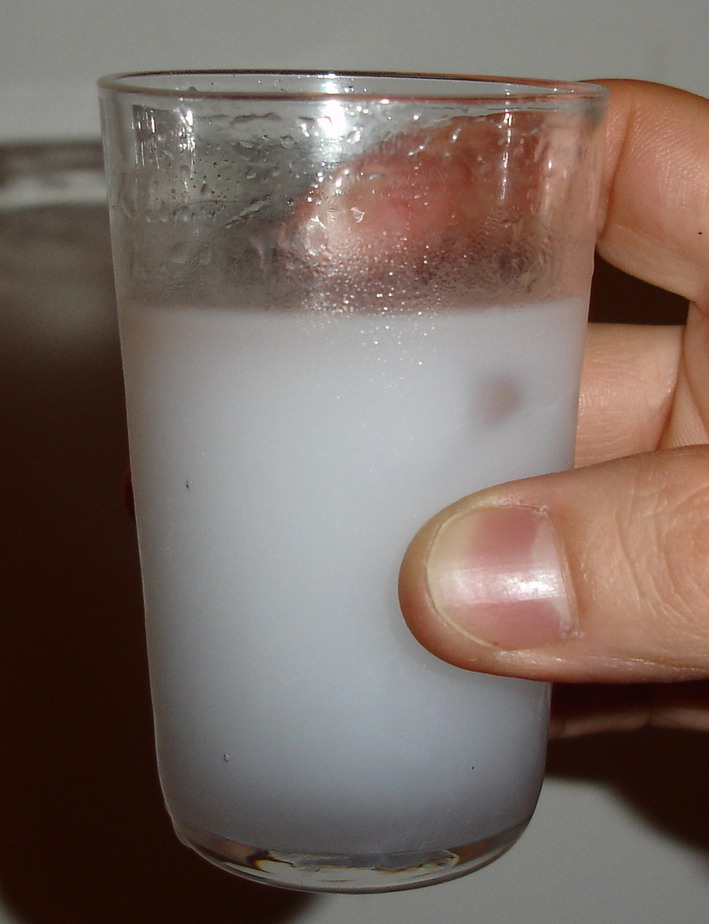
Arak with water and ice

First a strongly hydrophobic essential oil such as trans-anethole is dissolved in a water-miscible solvent, such as ethanol, and the ethanol itself forms a solution (a homogeneous mixture) with water.

If then the concentration of ethanol is lowered by addition of more water the hydrophobic substance precipitates from the solution and forms an emulsion with the remaining ethanol-water-mixture. The tiny droplets of the substance in the emulsion scatter light and thus make the mixture appear white.

Oil-in-water emulsions are not normally stable. Oil droplets coalesce until complete phase separation is achieved at macroscopic levels. Addition of a small amount of surfactant or the application of high shear rates (strong stirring) can stabilize the oil droplets.

In a water-rich ouzo mixture the droplet coalescence is dramatically slowed without mechanical agitation, dispersing agents, or surfactants. It forms a stable homogeneous fluid dispersion by liquid–liquid nucleation. The size of the droplets when measured by small-angle neutron scattering was found to be on the order of a micron.

Using dynamic light scattering, Sitnikova et al. showed that the droplets of oil in the emulsion grow by Ostwald ripening, and that droplets do not coalesce. The Ostwald ripening rate is observed to diminish with increasing ethanol concentrations until the droplets stabilize in size with an average diameter of 3microns.

Based on thermodynamic considerations of the multi-component mixture, the emulsion derives its stability from trapping between the binodal and spinodal curves in the phase diagram. However, the microscopic mechanisms responsible for the observed slowing of Ostwald ripening rates at increasing ethanol concentrations appear not fully understood.

== Applications ==
Video of water being poured into a solution of 151-proof Everclear and essential oils from grapefruit rinds.

Emulsions have many commercial uses. A large range of prepared food products, detergents, and body-care products take the form of emulsions that are required to be stable over a long period of time. The ouzo effect is seen as a potential mechanism for generating surfactant-free emulsions without the need for high-shear stabilisation techniques that are costly in large-scale production processes. The creation of a variety of dispersions such as pseudolatexes, silicone emulsions, and biodegradable polymeric nanocapsules, have been synthesized using the ouzo effect, though as stated previously, the exact mechanism of this effect remains unclear. Nanoparticles formed using the ouzo effect are thought to be kinetically stabilized as opposed to thermodynamically stabilized micelles formed using a surfactant due to the fast solidification of the polymer during the preparation process.

== See also ==
- Interface and colloid science
- Miniemulsion
- Anise-flavored liqueurs
- Spinodal
