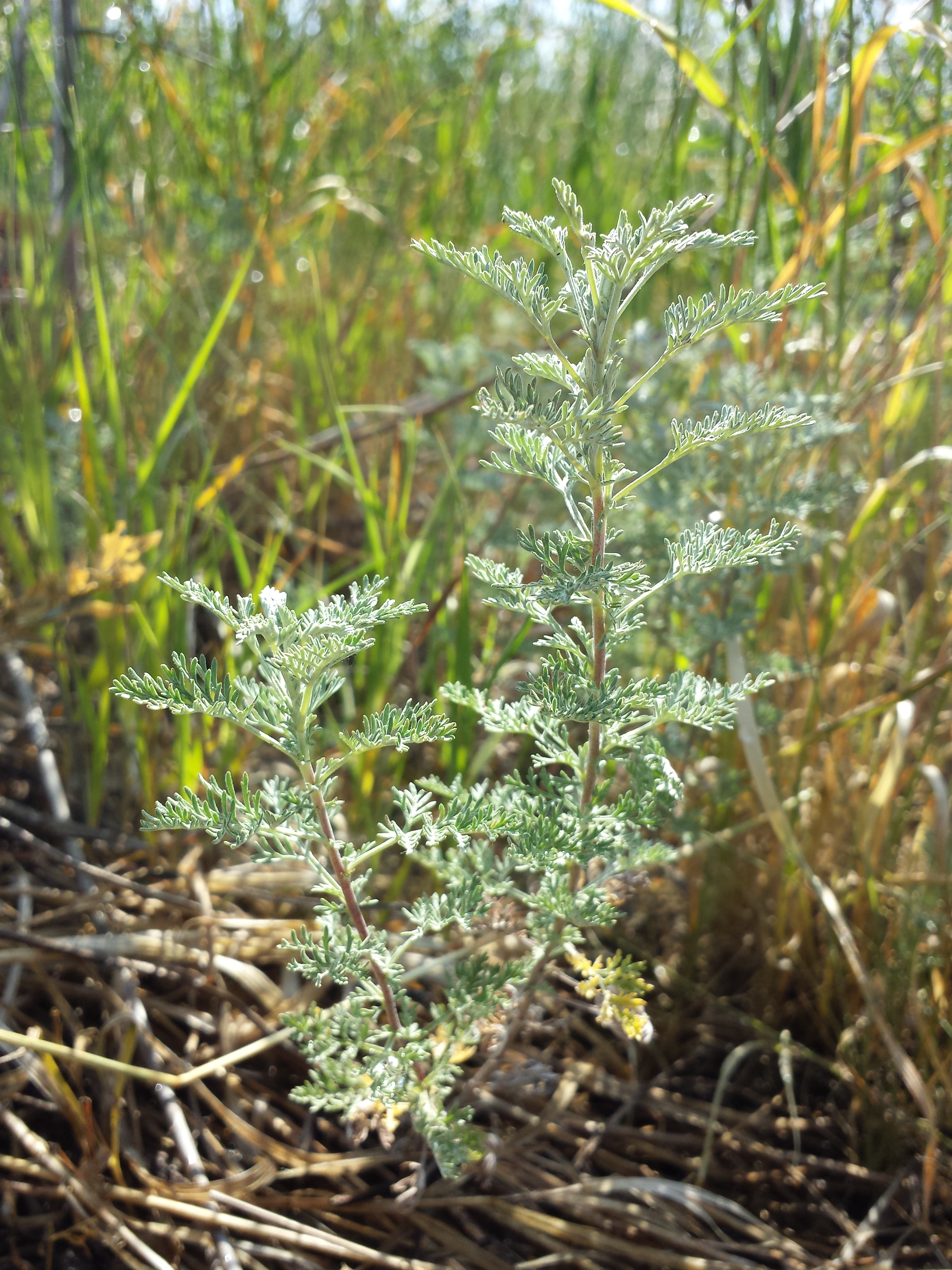

Scientific classification
- Kingdom: Plantae
- Clade: Tracheophytes
- Clade: Angiosperms
- Clade: Eudicots
- Clade: Asterids
- Order: Asterales
- Family: Asteraceae
- Genus: Artemisia
- Species: A. pontica

Binomial name
- Artemisia pontica L.

= Artemisia pontica =

Species of flowering plant

Artemisia pontica, the Roman wormwood or small absinthe, is an herb used in the production of absinthe and vermouth. Originating in southeastern Europe (the specific name refers to the Pontus area on the shores of the Black Sea), it is naturalized over much of Eurasia from France to Xinjiang, and is also found in the wild in northeastern North America.

Artemisia pontica is called "little absinthe" because it is smaller in stature and leaf than the "great absinthe" A. absinthium. It grows as a rhizomatous perennial with erect stems up to 100 centimetres (39 in) tall; the grey foliage is finely divided and aromatic. Flowers are small, yellowish, and appear in loose panicles at stem tips.

The essential oil contains cineol, camphor, thujone, and borneol among other components. It is said to be less bitter than great absinthe and is the principal flavoring of vermouth. It is commercially cultivated in Spain and Lithuania.

The English botanist John Hill, in his Virtues of British Herbs, says about this plant: "The Wormwood wine so famous with the Germans, is made with Roman Wormwood, put into the juice, and work’d with it : it is a strong and an excellent wine, not unpleasant, yet of such efficacy to give an appetite, that the Germans drink a glass with every other mouthful, and that way eat for hours together, without sickness or indigestion".
