= Light cavalerie vodka =

Light cavalerie vodka is a type of bitter. Specifically a type of Polish bitter known as nalewka, a macerate of herbs and spices in a distilled spirit, in this case vodka. The family of nalewka for which this belongs is commonly known as "Bitter Drops."

It is the highly aromatic, often retaining a bitterness. However, the taste can best be described as bittersweet, due to a varying amount of anise, tansy, cardamom, and ginger.

== Recipe ==
The origin of the vodka is unknown and there is no evidence if it has ever been produced commercially, at least on a large scale.

A common recipe used is a follows (because some of the originally ingredients are scarce and hard to come by the one following has been reformulated):

3g of ground aniseed
3g of angelica root
3g of tansy leaves
1g of black pepper
2g of nutmeg
1 clove
1g or more of cardamom seed

Macerate all ingredients in 50 ml of alcohol at 95% ABV with 25 ml of water for approximately 3 days. Filter out and add 400 ml of fresh vodka at 40% ABV to the alcohol, mix well and dilute with 60 ml of warm water. Let it rest one day and consume in room temperature in 30 ml glasses.

The other recipes for similar Bitter Drops call for: galangal, gentian, mint, wormwood, a number of chamomile varieties, or sweet flag.
