= Jeppson's Malört =

Brand of bäsk brännvin liqueur

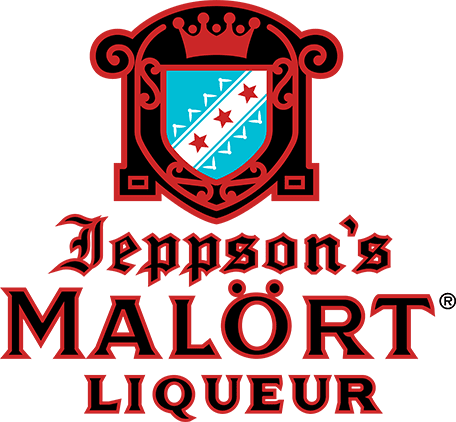

- A bottle of Jeppson's Malört
- Type: Liqueur
- Manufacturer: Carl Jeppson Company
- Introduced: 1933
- Proof (US): 70
- Website: malort.com

Jeppson's Malört is an American brand of bäsk liqueur, a type of brännvin flavored with wormwood. Malört was introduced in Chicago in the 1930s and was long produced by the Carl Jeppson Company. In 2018, as its last employee was retiring, the brand and company name were sold to CH Distillery of Chicago's Pilsen neighborhood. Jeppson's Malört is named after Carl Jeppson, a Swedish immigrant who first distilled and popularized the liquor in Chicago. Malört (literally moth herb) is the Swedish word for wormwood, which is the key ingredient in bäsk. Malört is extremely low in thujone, a chemical that is found in absinthe and similar drinks, which was once believed to be psychoactive at high levels.

Known for its extremely bitter taste, Malört has been described as "infamous" and "the worst booze ever". It can be found in some Chicago-area bars and liquor stores, and is growing in popularity with sales of Malört shots increasing from 0.4 million in 2007 to 7.9 million in 2022. For many years, it was difficult to find elsewhere in the United States. In the 2010s and 2020s, it gradually became more available in other areas.

== History ==
Carl Jeppson, a Swedish immigrant to Chicago, started producing the type of liqueur under his own brand, Malört. He first began to sell it door-to-door as a medicine in the 1920s so as to avoid the then extant prohibition on alcohol. According to legend, Jeppson preferred the strong taste because years of smoking had dulled his taste-buds. Attorney George Brode purchased the original recipe from Jeppson and created the Jeppson's Malört testimonial that once appeared on every bottle. Patricia Gabelick was hired by Brode as his secretary in 1966, and she took over the business after Brode's death in 1999, running it out of her Lakeview apartment.

It was made in Chicago by the Mar-Salle Company for over 30 years until 1982, two years after Mar-Salle was sold to Medley Distilling of Owensboro, KY. It was then made in Kentucky briefly after which it was produced in Florida for many years. In 2018, Jeppson's Malört was acquired by Chicago-based CH Distillery, and in 2019, production was moved back to Chicago. In the early 2020s, CH Distillery began distributing Malört more widely in the US.

== Reputation ==
While Gabelick acknowledged that the drink is a "niche liquor", selling a comparatively small number of cases annually, it has gained increased relevance among bartenders, bikers, and Chicago's southside community where Gabelick notes that it has become "a rite of passage". The satirist John Hodgman has also adopted the drink in his stage show, offering shots to his audience. In an interview with Gothamist blog Chicagoist, John Hodgman said Jeppson's Malört "tastes like pencil shavings and heartbreak."

For many years, it was only sold in the Chicago area. In summer 2013, Chicago bar Red Door featured a Malört-infused snow cone; the bar has a summer tradition of serving snow cones doused with alcohol. The liquor is mixed with Benedictine and Angostura orange bitters. West Town's Hoosier Mama Pie Co. used Jeppson's in 2017 for "a meringue-style pie" called the Chicago Sunrise.

In Joe Swanberg's 2013 film Drinking Buddies, drinking a shot of Malört is described as a Chicago tradition for erasing past mistakes. In it, actor Jason Sudeikis' character riffs that Malört is like swallowing a burnt condom filled with gasoline. In a similar vein, Joseph Atkinson, founder of CH Distillery, was introduced to Malört when he first moved to Chicago, and he compared it to "taking a bite out of a grapefruit and then drinking a shot of gasoline". Malört makes up half of the beer boilermaker called the Chicago Handshake (the other half is an Old Style beer).

In August 2015, the High-Hat Club was voted Best Malört Bar in Chicago and was awarded the Carl Cup, a perpetual trophy that is passed from past to current champions in a manner similar to the Stanley Cup. In 2015, WFMT host and musical comedian Robbie Ellis wrote a song about Malört, which was mentioned in Josh Noel's book about the spirit. In 2024, a brewpub in Lombard, Illinois, offered cicada-infused Malört shots (similar to the proverbial mezcal worm in tequila) with the prominent Chicago-area 17-year-periodical insect.

While Malört is sometimes mistaken for the common name of the style of liquor, the word is the trademarked brand name owned by Carl Jeppson Company. The company secured the trademark on November 3, 2015. Other distillers that produced a similar spirit renamed theirs beforehand. Letherbee reverted to the generic "Bësk", while FEW Spirits dubbed theirs "Anguish and Regret".

On August 30, 2026, a group of over 1000 people in Chicago bought tickets to an event focused on breaking the Guinness World Record of "The Largest Mass Of People Taking A Shot Of Malört At The Same Time.” The event received some online fanfare and Illinois Governor JB Pritzker also attended.

== See also ==
- Snaps
- Absinthe
- Chicago culture
- Piołunówka
- Cohasset Punch, another historic spirit with Chicago heritage
