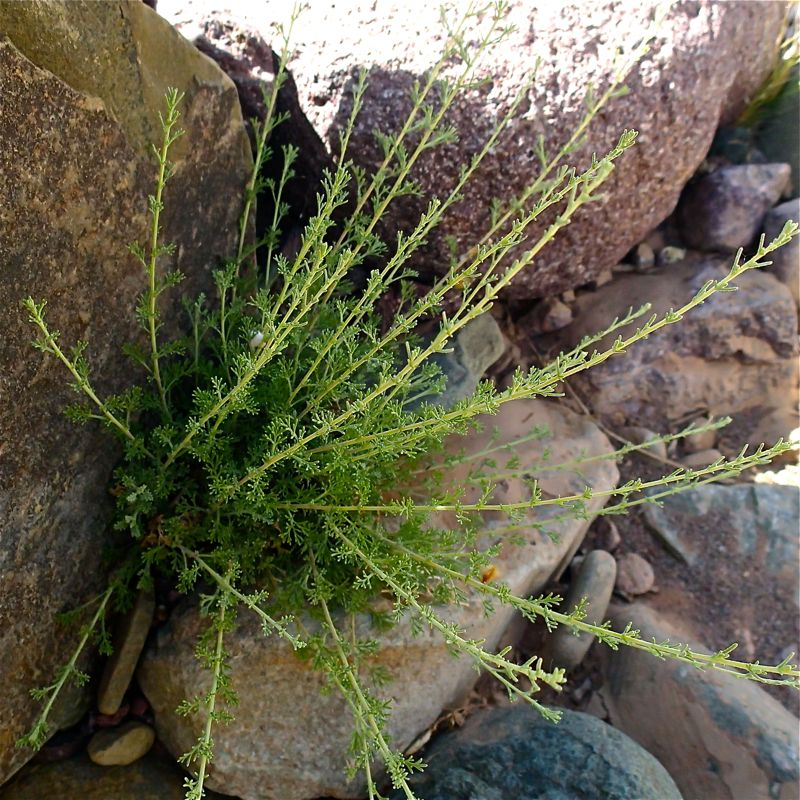

Scientific classification
- Kingdom: Plantae
- Clade: Tracheophytes
- Clade: Angiosperms
- Clade: Eudicots
- Clade: Asterids
- Order: Asterales
- Family: Asteraceae
- Genus: Artemisia
- Species: A. herba-alba

Binomial name
- Artemisia herba-alba Asso

Synonyms
- Artemisia aethiopica L.; Artemisia aragonensis Lam.; Artemisia lippii Jan ex Besser; Artemisia ontina Dufour; Seriphidium herba-alba (Asso) Soják

= Artemisia herba-alba =

Species of plant

Artemisia herba-alba, the white wormwood, is a perennial shrub in the genus Artemisia that grows commonly on the dry steppes of the Mediterranean regions in Northern Africa (Saharan Maghreb), Western Asia (Arabian Peninsula) and Southwestern Europe. It is used as an antiseptic and antispasmodic in herbal medicine.

== Names ==
Its specific epithet herba-alba means "white herb" in Latin, as its stems and leaves are white and woolly. Similarly, it is armoise herbe-blanche or armoise blanche in French.

In Arabic, it is shīeḥ (الشيح). In Old Testament Hebrew, it is la'anah (לענה) . In Greek, it is apsinthos, "wormwood" (in the Bible, Rev. 8:10–11).

== Botanical description ==
Artemisia herba-alba is a chamaeophyte that grows to 20–40 cm (8–16 in). Leaves are strongly aromatic and covered with fine glandular hairs that reflect sunlight giving a grayish aspect to the shrub. The leaves of sterile shoots are grey, petiolate, ovate to orbicular in outline; whereas, the leaves of flowering stems, more abundant in winter, are much smaller.

The flowering heads are sessile, oblong and tapering at base. The plant flowers from September to December. The receptacle is naked with 2–5 yellowish hermaphrodite flowers per head.

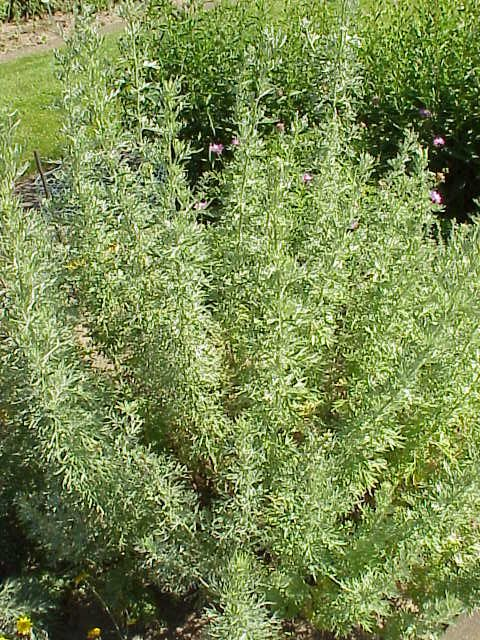
Artemisia herba-alba, the 'white wormwood', in a garden

== Phytochemistry ==
Essential oil of A. herba-alba, from the Sinai Desert, contains mainly 1,8-cineole and appreciable amounts of α- / β-thujone as well as other oxygenated monoterpenes including terpinen-4-ol, camphor and borneol. Davanone, chrysanthenone and cis-chrysanthenol have been described as major constituents in some populations of A. herba-alba from Morocco and Spain. Less common non-head-to-tail monoterpene alcohols have been identified in some populations from Negev desert, such as santolina alcohol and yomogi alcohol.

Several sesquiterpene lactones were found in the aerial parts of A. herba-alba. Mainly, eudesmanolides and germacranolides types were reported in most cases. A variety of flavonoids were also described mainly with methylated (i.e. patuletin) and O-methylated (i.e. hispidulin, cirsilineol) aglycones. The presence of C-glycosides (i.e. isovitexin, schaftoside, isoschaftoside) is also noticeable.

== Uses ==
Artemisia herba-alba is good fodder for grazing animals, mainly sheep, and in the Algerian steppes cattle.

=== Herbal medicine ===
This species of sagebrush is widely used in herbal medicine for its antiseptic, vermifuge and antispasmodic properties. Artemisia herba-alba was reported as a traditional remedy of enteritis, and various intestinal disturbances, among the Bedouins in the Negev desert. Based on laboratory assays, essential oil showed antibacterial activity, as well as, antispasmodic activity on rabbits and cytotoxic effect on cancer cells.

Artemisia herba-alba based teas were used in Iraqi folk medicine for the treatment of diabetes mellitus. An aqueous extract of aerial parts of the plant has shown a hypoglycemic effect in alloxan-induced diabetic rabbits and mice.

== Culture ==
Artemisia herba-alba is thought to be the plant translated as "wormwood" in English-language versions of the Bible (apsinthos in the Greek text) due to regional distribution within Mediterranean regions. In the apocalyptic Book of Revelation ending the Bible, the star named "Wormwood" falls to earth and turns a third of its waters bitter. Similarly where the Biblical Hebrew word לענה (la'anah) appears in the Hebrew Bible, it is generally translated into English as "wormwood". The word occurs nine times in the Hebrew Bible, seven times with the implication of bitterness and twice as a proper noun, in the Greek translation apsinthos, naming the physical meteor in its orbit, in Revelation 8:11. The English rendering "wormwood" additionally refers to the dark green oil produced by the plant, which was used to kill intestinal worms.
