= Nalewka =

Infused alcoholic beverage

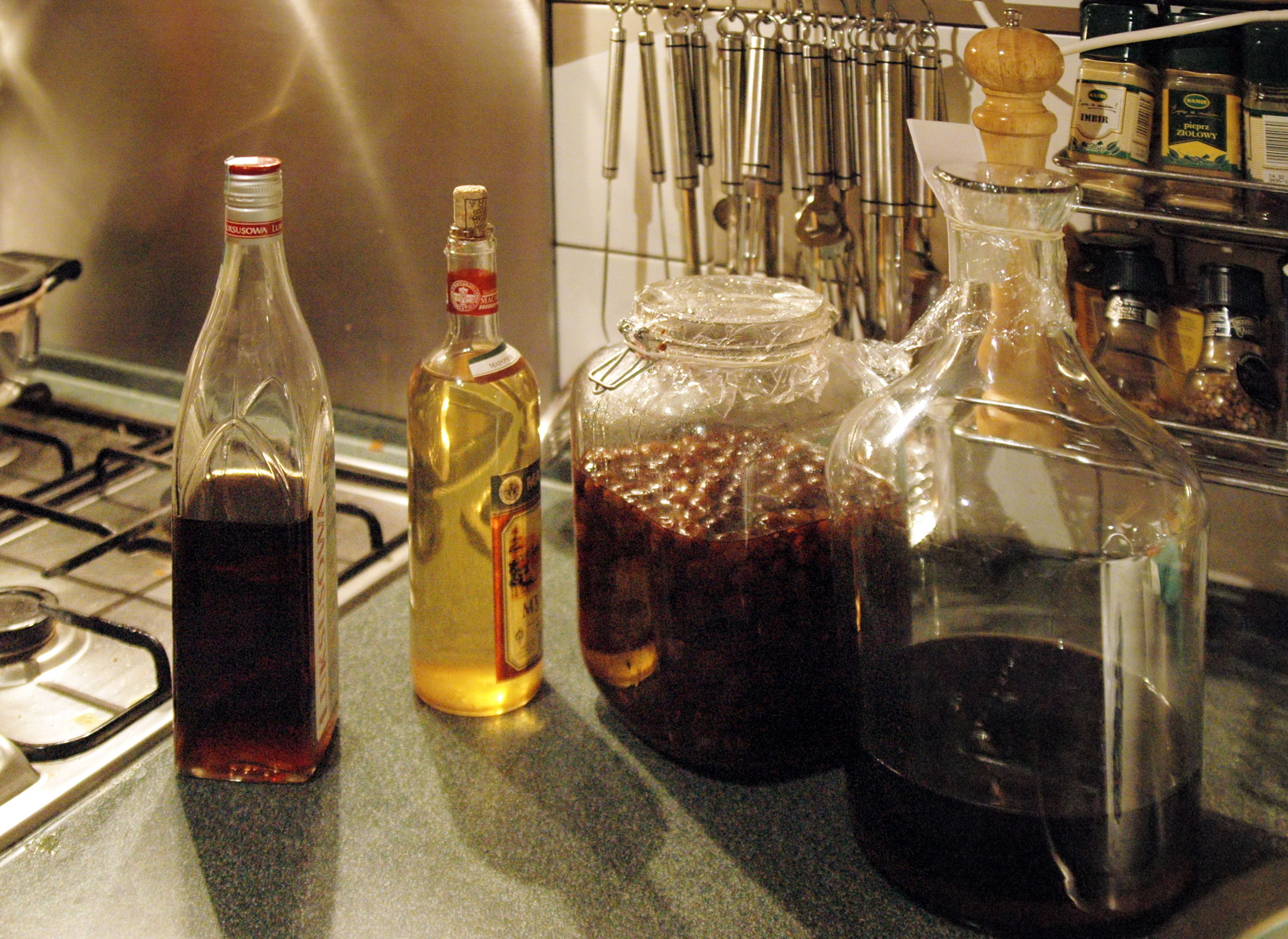
A variety of nalewka recipes in various stages of preparation

Nalewka (IPA: [na'lɛfka]), plural nalewki, is a traditional alcoholic beverage from Poland. Similar to medicinal tinctures, it is usually 40% to 45% alcohol by volume, though some can be as strong as 75%. Nalewka is created by macerating and / or infusing various ingredients in alcohol, usually vodka or neutral spirits. Common ingredients include fruits, herbs, spices, roots, sugar, and honey. Unlike ordinary liqueurs, nalewki are usually aged. Since nalewka is produced by infusion rather than distillation, the liquid is typically colorful and somewhat opaque. Taste-wise, nalewka is similar to fruit liqueurs such as schnapps or eau-de-vie, but is usually sweeter and typically lacks a strong alcohol taste.

The name nalewka is sometimes misleadingly used for a variety of commercially produced alcohols sold in Poland, usually of low quality and alcohol content.

It could also be confused with its cognate, nalivka or nalyvka (Russian, Ukrainian: наливка), popular in Ukraine since the 17th century and in Russia since the second half of the 16th century. While the Polish nalewka is an infusion, the Ukrainian/Russian nalivkas are made by filling a jar with fruits/berries, sugar and spirit, sealing it, and letting the contents stay for some time. The Ukrainian/Russian nalivkas are much weaker (usually containing less than 20% alcohol). The proper name for a Russian analogue of a Polish nalewka would be nastoika, infusion. (Russian: настойка, Ukrainian: настоянка, nastoyanka, literally, tincture). Nowadays the distinction between the usages of the terms nastoika and nalivka is blurred, with nalivka applied only to fruit/berry-based liquors, while nastoikas include usage of herbs and spices.

== History ==
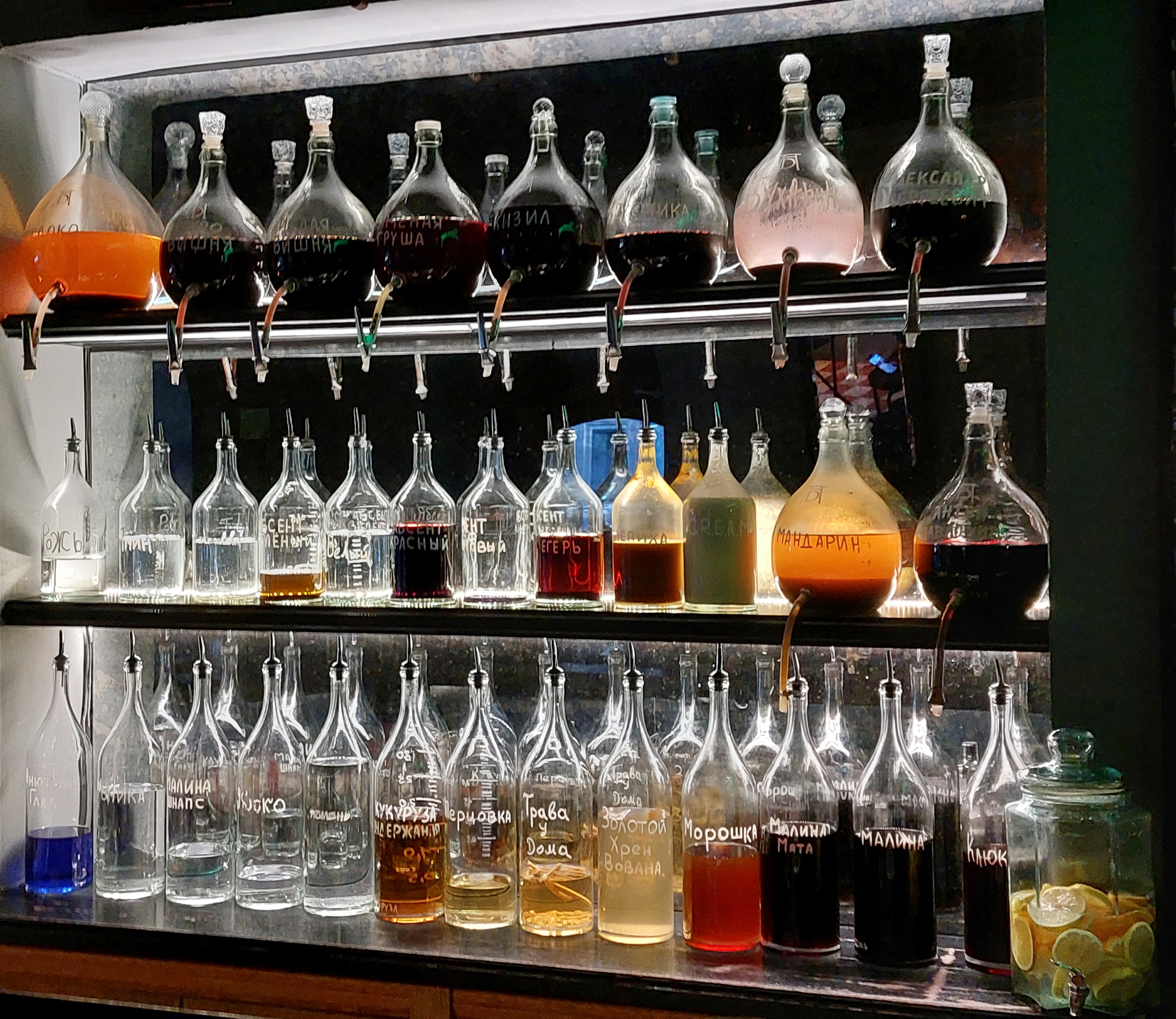
A variety of nalewka

The first documented alcoholic herbal tinctures were created by Hippocrates, the "father of medicine", as treatments for illnesses. During Roman times, it was popular to infuse wines with spices, giving rise to hippocras and mulled wine. Through the following centuries, various European cultures developed many flavored alcohols using locally available fruits, herbs, and spices. This preserved the flavors and medicinal properties of seasonal ingredients for use throughout the year, either as remedies or libations. Creating sweetened alcoholic tinctures gained popularity in Poland during the 16th century, possibly due to an influx of French culture brought by Henry III of France. The oldest known Polish book describing nalewka was written by Stefan Falimierz and published in Kraków in 1534, titled On Herbs and Their Potency (O ziolach y o moczy gich). From the 16th to 19th centuries, the Manor houses of Polish nobility typically produced and stocked a variety of nalewki, and recipes were passed down through home almanacs called "Silva rerum". Families in the Polish nobility, known as the Szlachta, often kept these recipes secret, giving them only to the senior children upon the father's death. The production of nalewka later spread to ordinary households, and from the mid to late 19th century a large number of books were published describing processes and recipes, as well as instructions for obtaining ingredients.

== Ingredients ==
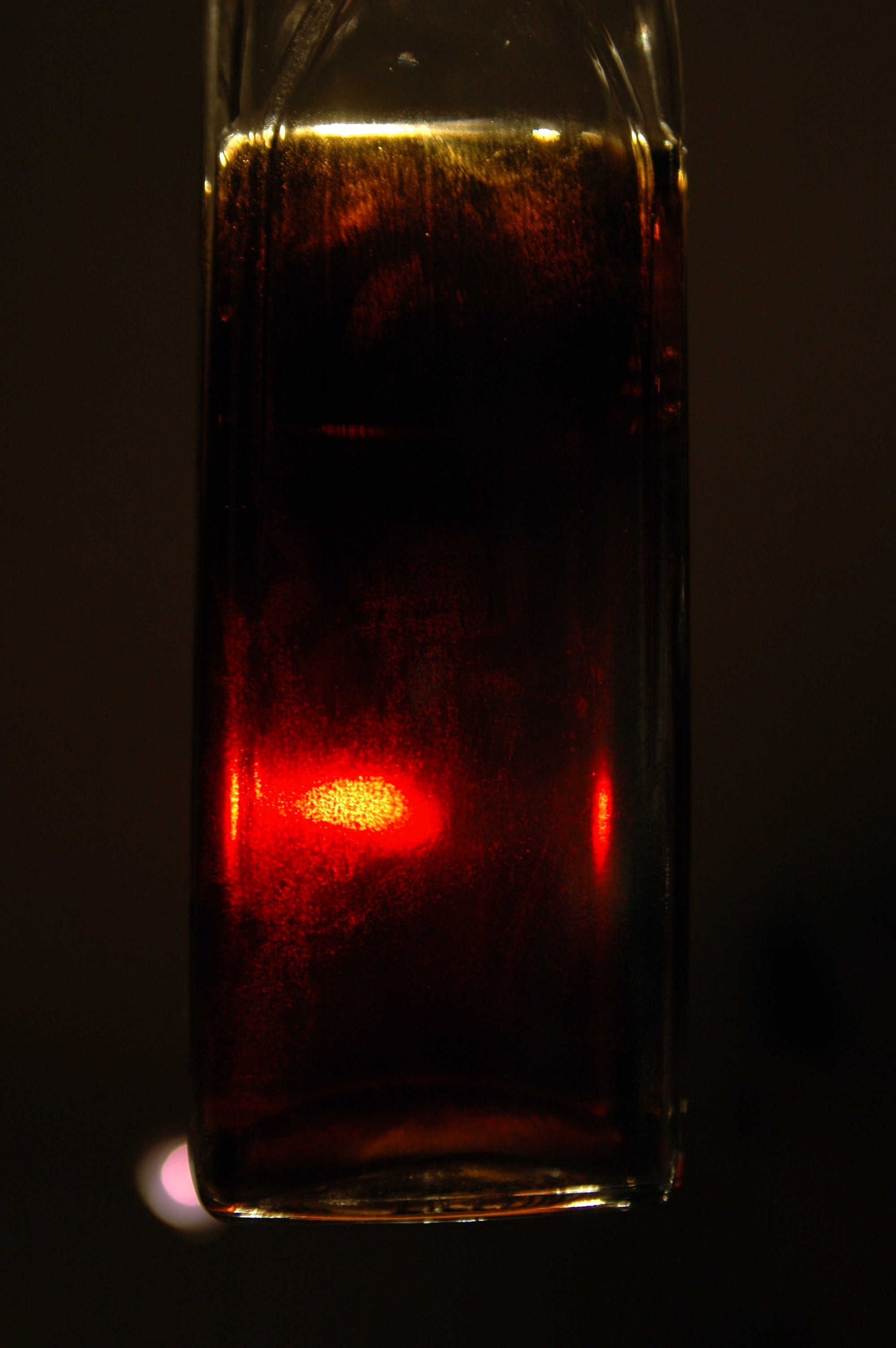
The color of coffee-based nalewka after three years of aging, half of that time in a wooden barrel

Most nalewki derive their name from either their main ingredient or the name of their traditional place of production. Common ingredients of nalewki are fruits, herbs, spices, roots, leaves, flowers, sugar, and honey. Some examples of ingredients and the corresponding nalewka are below:

- Anise (anyżówka)
- Apricots (morelówka)
- Blackberry (jeżynówka)
- Blackcurrants (porzeczkówka)
- Cherries (wiśniówka)
- Chokeberries (aroniówka)
- Common hawthorn (głogówka)
- Cornus mas (dereniówka)
- Ginger (imbirówka)
- Green Persian walnuts (orzechówka)
- Juniper (jałowcówka)^{1}
- Lemon (cytrynówka)
- Quince (pigwówka)
- Raspberry (malinówka)
- Wormwood (piołunówka)

== Notes ==
1.Technically some varieties of gin are also nalewki.

== See also ==
- Krupnik
- Pelinkovac
