= Wiśniówka (liqueur) =

Cherry-based beverage of Poland

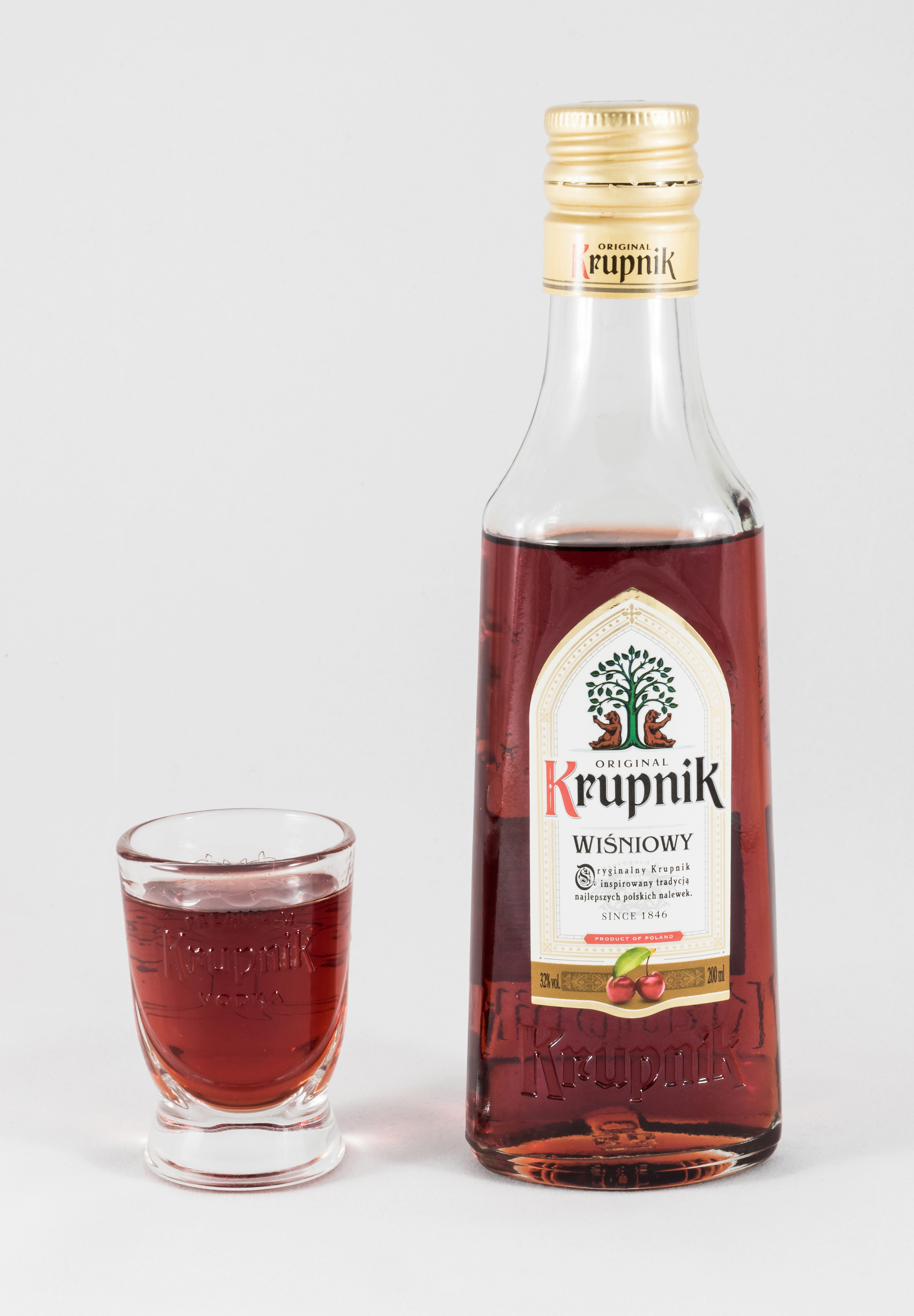
A bottle and glass of Krupnik-brand wiśniówka

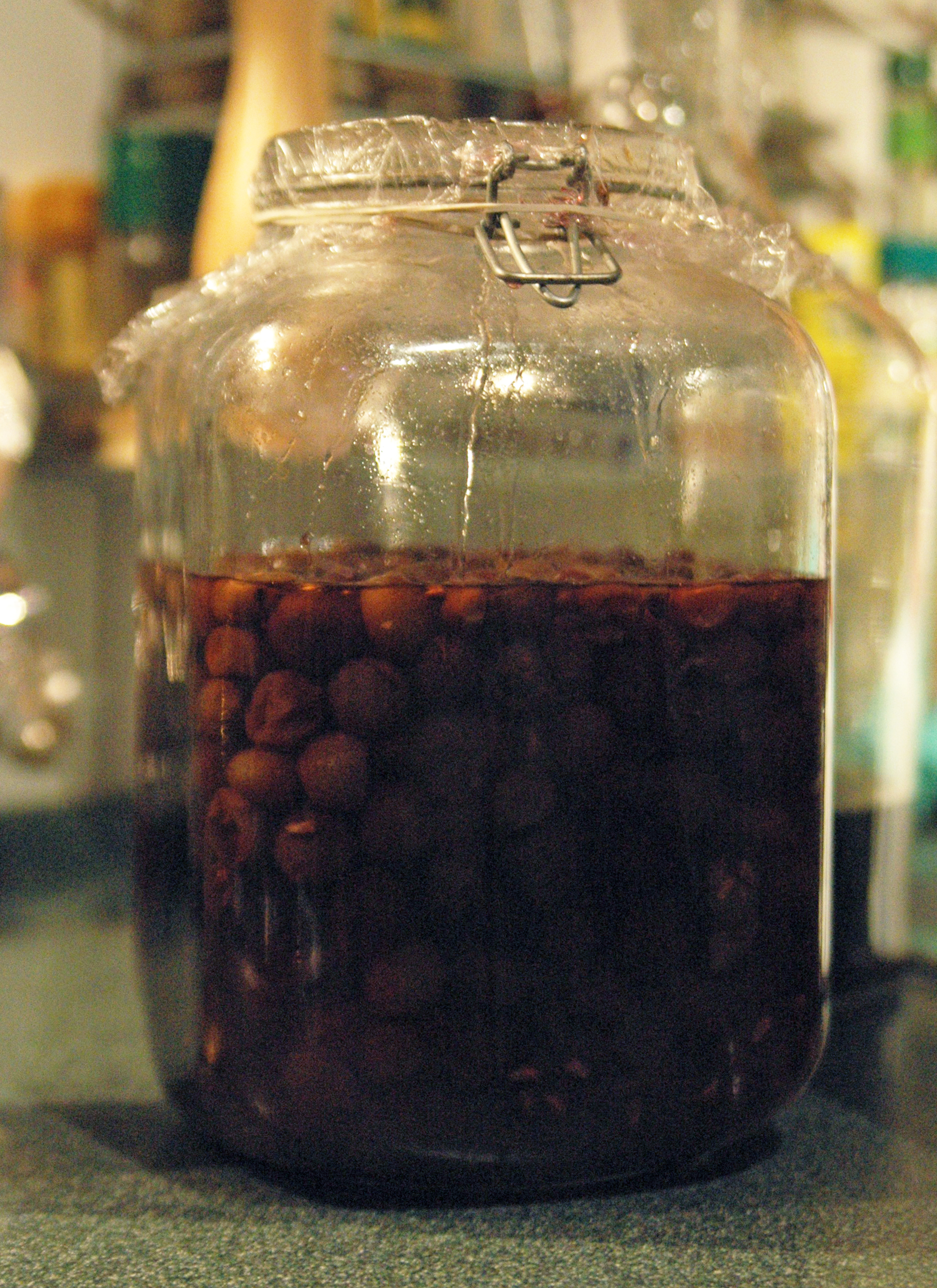
Home made wiśniówka

Wiśniówka or vyshnivka (Ukrainian: вишнівка) is a type of liqueur (Polish: nalewka, Ukrainian: наливка, nalyvka), or cordial, traditionally made in Poland and neighbouring Ukraine by macerating (soaking) sour cherries in vodka/horilka or neutral spirits.

It can be purchased ready-made, or made at home using just sour cherries, sugar and alcohol. It is one of the most common and popular types of nalewka, usually made at the end of summer. Typically, the alcoholic content ranges from 30% to 50%.

== History ==
In Ukrainian lands during the Cossack times vyshnivka was traditionally produced by soaking fruit (cherries) in horilka for at least two months. The resulting drink attained the taste and aroma of the fruit. Cherry nalyvka was the most popular variety of this type. It would be frequently used as a present by Cossack starshyna and was exported to the Russian Empire and Crimean Khanate.
