= Piołunówka =

Polish alcoholic infusion related to absinthe

Piołunówka (Polish pronunciation: [pʲɔ.wuˈnuf.ka]) is a very bitter alcoholic infusion (Polish: "nalewka") made by macerating wormwood in alcohol. Its name comes from Polish: piołun, lit. 'wormwood'. Piołunówka is considered a cure for problems with digestive tract and is believed to enhance appetite. Traditionally it is consumed in small amounts.

Piołunówka differs from absinthe in that it is macerated and rarely distilled, whereas absinthe is additionally distilled. It is becoming popular due to the absinthe revival but has been well known before absinthe. Piołunówka is not simply an amateur's version of absinthe but can be perceived as its predecessor. For centuries wormwood-based elixirs have been used as digestive aids and disease preventatives.

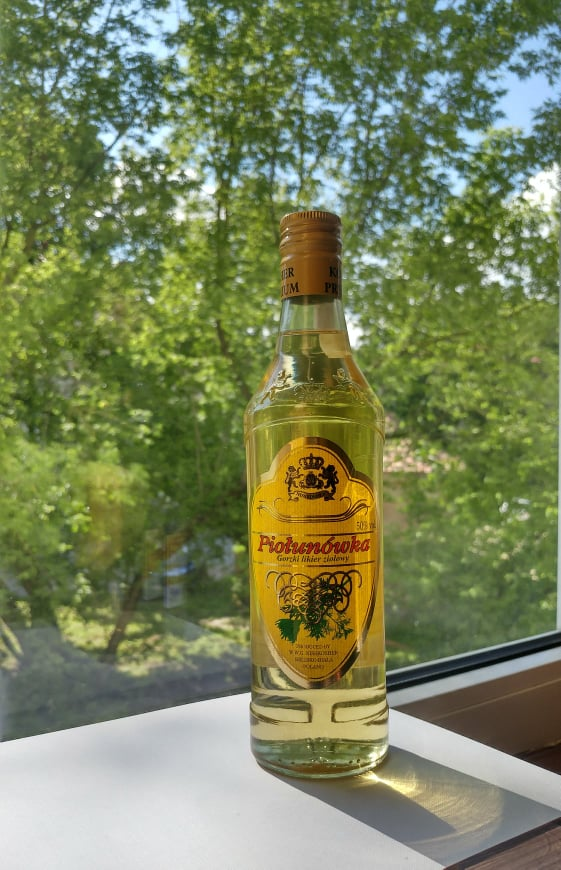
Nisskosher piołunowka

== Thujone ==
Piołunowka has much higher levels of thujone than absinthe because it is not distilled. Many people produce it today in an attempt to feel the "absinthe effect" because of its higher thujone levels, although it is not well known how thujone plays a role in these purported effects and is in fact a known poison.

== Availability ==
Piołunówka is typically hard to find outside of Poland. While wormwood is available at many herb stores, it is not always of sufficient quality for making piołunówka.

== Ingredients ==
Apart from fresh wormwood usually some other ingredients are used such as: peppercorns, black tea, raisins, honey, geranium leaves and hypericum flowers. All herbs used should be freshly picked, not dried (apart from tea). The alcohol used is plain vodka or spirit in which herbs and other ingredients are soaked for a period of about 2 weeks and then filtered. It can be easily produced at home and does not require aging.

== History ==
The recipe dates back to at least the 16th century, as Piołunówka is described in Stefan Falimierz' 1534 opus On Herbs and Their Potency (O ziolach y o moczy ich). As such, it has traditionally been made in noble manors, though the recipes might have varied in their ingredients and preparations.

The last widely available piołunówka was distilled in Lwów by J. A. Baczewski distillery up to 1939. The modern version appeared with the same label released by Polmos in Starogard Gdański who discontinued the production in the 1990s.

== See also ==
- Malört
