= Sport dog nutrition =

High performance sport dogs are those bred and trained to compete in various athletic events. Events include but are not limited to, agility trials, hunting and racing. These events are physically and metabolically demanding. As a result, canine athletes require specialized nutrition in order to perform at high levels during events and for maintenance and recovery. The main nutritional concern for sport dogs is adequate energy. A well-balanced diet, containing the appropriate amounts of protein, fat, carbohydrate, fiber and micronutrients is essential to meet these energy requirements.

== Protein ==
Protein is an essential component in any dog's diet. Muscle, hair, skin, ligaments, cartilage, and chest and abdomen organs are structurally supported by protein. In comparison to the average dog, a performance or sporting dog requires a greater protein intake. This is a result of wear and tear on muscles and other organ tissues caused by strenuous activity. Protein is also a vital component in bodily functions such as transporting oxygen and energy to the muscles, regulating blood glucose levels, fighting infections, and repairing tissues. Many diets targeted for performance dogs contain 30% protein. However, dogs performing in different athletic activities can require varying amounts of protein and essential amino acids. For instance, studies have shown that sled dogs require a high protein, high fat diet, where 30 to 40% of energy comes from protein and 50% of energy comes from fat. Greyhounds were found to require a moderate protein (25% energy) and moderately high fat (30-50% energy) diet. At present, there are conflicting opinions concerning whether protein from animal sources is of higher quality than protein from non animal sources. For instance, a study completed by Brown et al., concluded that "In a 16-week controlled experiment, a meat-free diet maintained haematological characteristics in sprint-racing sled dogs (Siberian huskies)". No deficiencies or side effects were noted in this study. However, in previous studies, it was discovered that when feeding non animal protein diets to performance dogs, a larger prevalence of anemia was found in comparison to when dogs were fed diets containing animal protein. Poor iron bioavailability can lead to anemia. As stated by Chausow and Czarnecki-Maulden, it is generally accepted that animal sources of protein have more iron bioavailability than plant sources. Studies have been conducted to compare iron bioavailability when feeding animal and non animal sources of protein. However, research on dogs for this topic is lacking. Studies completed by Chausow and Czarnecki-Maulden conclude that more research needs to be done on iron bioavailability of plant and animal protein sources. Regardless of the source, when feeding the sporting dog, protein is an essential component of the diet. Nutritional demands must be met in order to achieve high performance levels.

== Carbohydrates ==
Carbohydrates provide a quick energy source, increased palatability as well as fiber in canine diets; if disaccharides and xylitol are avoided. In an ingredient label, starch (a complex carbohydrate) may appear as rice, wheat, barley, corn and/or other varying grains. These ingredients not only supply the dog with rapid and accessible energy while performing, but can also be used after exercise to replenish glycogen stores in organs such as the liver and muscle. Direct carbohydrate levels are not displayed on feed labels due to the inaccuracy of current testing methods and varying methods in which certain sources may effect an animal's glycemic response. However, for canines it has been demonstrated that rice has the greatest blood glucose response followed by wheat, barley, corn and sorghum. Diets containing rice or wheat should be blended with some low level carbohydrate sources like (sorghum or barley) to prevent an animal's blood glucose from spiking.

== Fiber ==
Highly soluble or fermentable fiber from carbohydrate sources mentioned, and others, above also provide short chain fatty acids. These short chain fatty acids can represent approximately 10% of an animal's energy requirement through microbial fermentation within the gut. Gut health is also promoted by increasing mucosal health, increasing the microbial balance, improving digestion, improving nutrient absorption and upregulating immunity. To insure this, owners should be looking to feed diets that contain 3%-7% of total digestible fiber (TDF) or ingredients such as beet pulp or rice bran which are moderately fermentable. Total dietary fiber is not standard on pet food labels; generally, only crude fiber is provided, which does not give an indication of the solubility of fermentability of an ingredient. If non-soluble or non-fermentable fiber is found within the diet, the animal is likely to experience increased fecal bulk and moisture as well as a diluted energy intake. Consequently, dogs may experience decreased nutrient absorption, dehydration, pathogenic bacterial growth in the gut and diarrhea. Avoiding diets with crude fiber levels of over 3% or high inclusions of ingredients such as cellulose or peanut hulls will assist in preventing some consequences such as pathogenic bacterial growth, colonic atrophy and dehydration. Furthermore, there are some additional fibers such as fructooligosaccharides (FOS) and mannanoligosaccharides (MOS) which will promote good bacteria and inhibit harmful ones, respectively. These two fibers are most important for animals fed a raw diet where pathogenic bacteria may be more prevalent.

== Water ==
Dogs require a constant source of clean and fresh water. This is especially true for sporting dogs participating in high energy activities. High-protein diets require increased water intake for removal of extra nitrogen via urination.12 Furthermore, to deposit protein within the animal, water is also an essential mediator. The sporting dog should have access to water at all times. This is due to the fact that water intake needs are constantly adapting based on body water stores, exercise, food type, and sodium intake.12,13 Sporting dogs fed a raw or wet diet receive additional water from the high moisture content of these food types. This is in comparison to those fed a dry extruded diet. However, this does not mean sporting dogs fed a raw or wet diet should be offered less water throughout the day.

== Additives ==
Additives are low-inclusion ingredients used to provide essential nutrients such as vitamins, minerals, antioxidants as well as anti-inflammatory and preservative factors. These are all important aspects in a high performance sporting dog diet. Vitamins and minerals are essential for all types of dogs and the inclusion rate of them is dependent on factors such as age, size, activity level, etc.19 Not meeting an animal's mineral and vitamin requirements can impact the level of performance tremendously.19 However, too high of a concentration of vitamins and minerals will increase the concentration of ash in the feed. Currently, it is stated that dog foods containing above 7% ash content may have long-term negative consequences on canines.1 Antioxidants such as vitamin E, beta carotene, rosemary oil, sage oil and lutein have been demonstrated in numerous studies to decrease immune response DNA damage linked to cancer, cataracts and arthritis by attaching to free radicals.23 This is important to consider with high performance sporting dogs due to the athlete's high prevalence of developing arthritis later in life. Various antioxidants will be used by the sporting dog to preserve animal and vegetable fats, vitamins and other ingredients prone to rancidity caused by oxidation, all of which are found in relatively high concentrations in performance canine diets.27 As a preventative of arthritis, other additives may be included in the diet. These include glucosamine, chondroitine sulphate and omega-3 fatty acids, such as EPA and DHA from fish oil.14,27 These factors have been shown to limit the development of chronic swelling and decrease existing inflammation caused by arthritis, which is essential in the high performance sporting dog.14,19

== Diet considerations based on competitive event ==
There are many factors to be considered when choosing a sporting dog diet. These factors include breed, age, and the sport the dog will be participating in. It is important to select a diet that provides the necessary nutrients and energy to optimize athletic performance as well as maintain overall health. Studies have shown that energy requirements are distance-dependent, meaning they are proportional to the distance travelled, not the speed of travel. Therefore, endurance events will have higher energy requirements than short-distance sprinting events.

Endurance events are classified as prolonged exercise at submaximal levels of exertion. These events include dog sled racing, hunting and herding. To sustain this level of activity, energy is provided to the muscles through aerobic metabolism where high energy fat is utilized as the main fuel source. Several studies have shown an increase in stamina when dogs are fed a high fat diet. Increased protein is beneficial to support gluconeogenesis from amino acids during endurance events and to aid recovery. Carbohydrates are required in lesser amounts. A study conducted on sled dogs found that dogs fed a high carbohydrate diet showed signs of tying up and hypoglycaemia during intense exercise. Reducing the carbohydrate levels resolved these issues.

In contrast, sprinting events are characterized by short bursts of speed that rely on anaerobic metabolism to provide energy to the muscles. Carbohydrates are the main source of fuel for these initial accelerations. Glycogen levels are depleted in the first several seconds of sprinting before the muscles switch to aerobic metabolism that favours fat sources in dogs. A moderately high-fat and high-protein diet is beneficial, but it has also been suggested that increasing carbohydrate intake may support the initial sprint event; however, this has not been scientifically proven.
