= Absinthin =

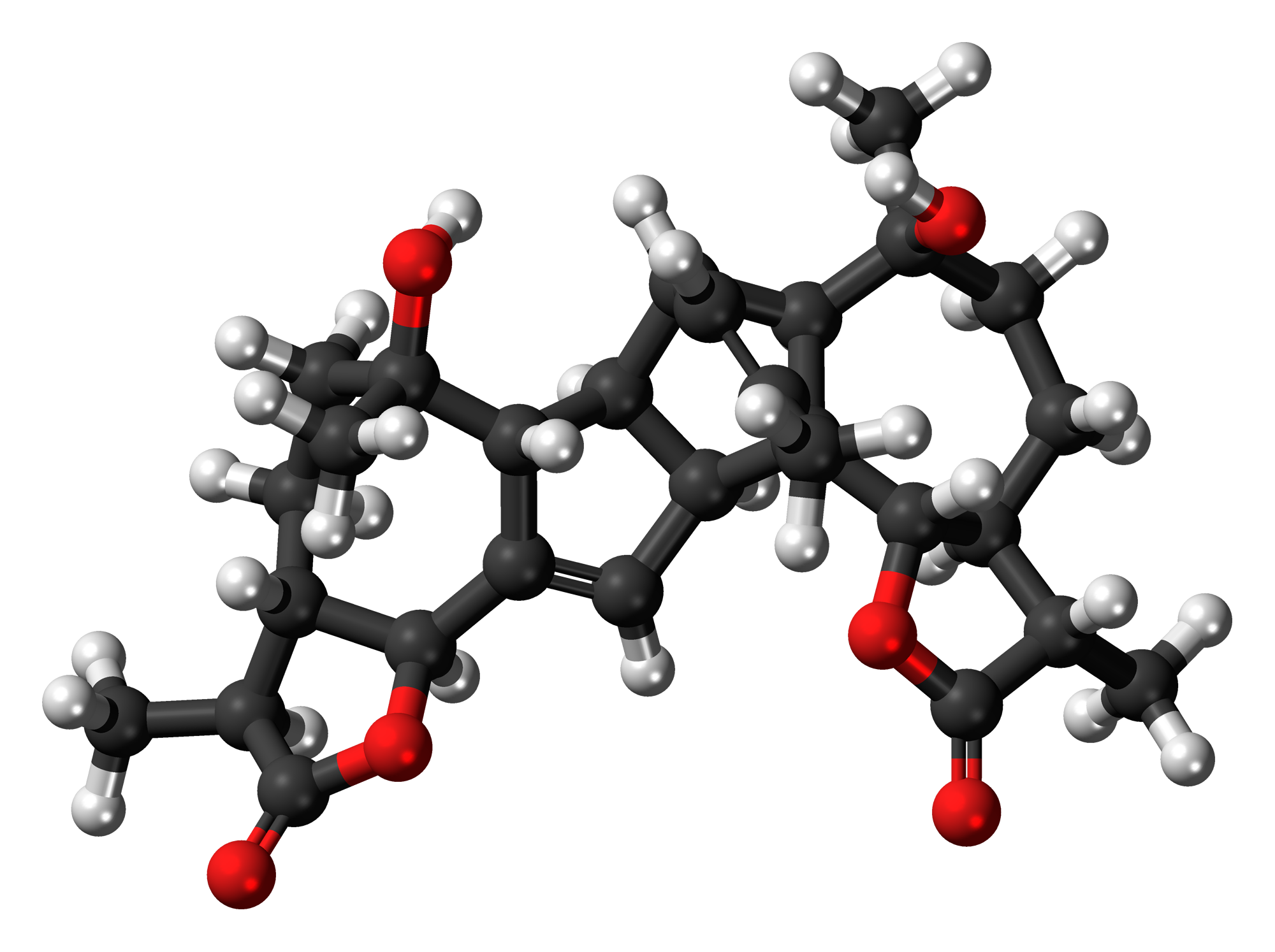

Names
- IUPAC name (1R,2R,5S,8S,9S,12S,13R,14S,15S,16R,17S,20S,21S,24S)-12,17-dihydroxy-3,8,12,17,21,25-hexamethyl-6,23-dioxaheptacyclo[13.9.2.01,16.02,14.04,13.05,9.020,24]hexacosa-3,25-diene-7,22-dione

Identifiers
CAS Number	13624-21-0
3D model (JSmol)	Interactive image; Interactive image
ChEBI	CHEBI:2366
ChEMBL	ChEMBL501255
ChemSpider	66277
PubChem CID	442138
UNII	OE5992O64P
CompTox Dashboard (EPA)	DTXSID70929294
- InChI: InChI=1S/C30H40O6/c1-12-11-18-20-21(30(12)24(18)29(6,34)10-8-17-14(3)27(32)36-25(17)30)15(4)19-22(20)28(5,33)9-7-16-13(2)26(31)35-23(16)19/h11,13-14,16-18,20-25,33-34H,7-10H2,1-6H3/t13-,14-,16-,17-,18-,20-,21-,22-,23-,24-,25-,28-,29-,30+/m0/s1 Key: PZHWYURJZAPXAN-JAJHBKHXSA-N; InChI=1S/C30H40O6/c1-12-11-18-20-21(30(12)24(18)29(6,34)10-8-17-14(3)27(32)36-25(17)30)15(4)19-22(20)28(5,33)9-7-16-13(2)26(31)35-23(16)19/h11,13-14,16-18,20-25,33-34H,7-10H2,1-6H3/t13-,14-,16-,17-,18-,20-,21-,22-,23-,24-,25-,28-,29-,30+/m0/s1; Key: PZHWYURJZAPXAN-JAJHBKHXSA-N
- SMILES: [H][C@@]12CC[C@](C)(O)[C@@]3([H])C(=C(C)[C@@]4([H])[C@]3([H])[C@H]3C=C(C)[C@@]44[C@@]5([H])OC(=O)[C@@H](C)[C@]5([H])CC[C@](C)(O)[C@]34[H])[C@@]1([H])OC(=O)[C@H]2C; O=C6O[C@@H]7[C@]25C(=C/[C@H]([C@@H]1[C@@H]3/C(=C(/C)[C@@H]12)[C@H]4OC(=O)[C@H]([C@@H]4CC[C@@]3(O)C)C)[C@H]5[C@](O)(C)CC[C@H]7[C@@H]6C)\C

Properties
Chemical formula	C_{30}H_{40}O_{6}
Molar mass	496.635
- Except where otherwise noted, data are given for materials in their standard state (at 25 °C [77 °F], 100 kPa). verify (what is ?) Infobox references

Absinthin is a naturally produced triterpene lactone from the plant Artemisia absinthium (Wormwood). It constitutes one of the most bitter chemical agents responsible for absinthe's distinct taste. The compound shows biological activity and has shown promise as an anti-inflammatory agent, and should not be confused with thujone, a neurotoxin also found in Artemisia absinthium.

== Chemical structure ==
Absinthin's (1) complex structure is classified as a sesquiterpene lactone, meaning it belongs to a large category of natural products chemically derived from 5-carbon "building blocks" (3) derived from isoprene (4). The complete structure consists of two identical monomers (2) that are attached via a suspected naturally occurring Diels Alder reaction occurring at the alkenes on the 5-membered ring of the guaianolide.

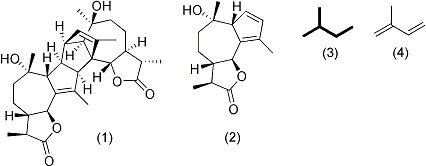
Illustration of the isoprenoid components involved in the biosynthesis of absinthin

== Total synthesis ==
Total synthesis of (+)-absinthin was conducted in 2004 by Zhang, et al. The final yield reported for the synthesis was 18.6% over a course of 10 steps originating from santonin (1), a commercially available reagent. The basis of the synthesis was the ring expansion of the original 6-membered carbon ring to the 7-membered ring, engendering the formation of the guaianolide monomer (2) scaffold, followed by Diels Alder coupling (3) and final stereochemical modifications resulting in (+)-absinthin (4).

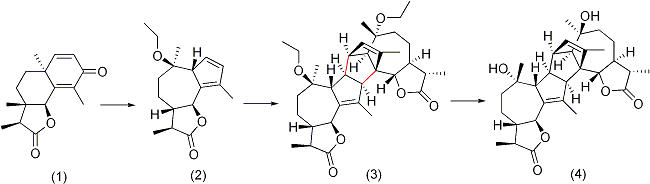
Illustration of the total synthesis conducted by Zhang, et al. of absinthin

== Biosynthesis ==
The full biosynthesis of absinthin in Artemisia absinthium has not been elucidated, but a great portion of it can be inferred from the natural product precursors required to access absinthin. While terpenoids such as absinthin can be said to consist of isoprene "units," isoprene by itself is too stable and does not react directly. Rather, the isoprene units are transferred and reacted as diphosphates. As the nomenclature for terpenes suggests, the first absinthin precursor farnesyl diphosphate [A] contains 15 carbons, or 3 isoprene units. Diphosphate departure (1) generates a carbocation within the synthase, which can then be attacked by a carbon-carbon double bond at the opposing end of the molecule (2). The first stable intermediate in the biosynthesis pathway in Artemisia is likely germacrene A [B], which has been previously identified in plant sesquiterpene pathways as a precursor to guaianolides. From there, hydroxylation (3) occurs, followed by oxidation (4) to an aldehyde directly followed by further hydroxylation (5) and formation of a carboxyl group. The disappearance of the terminal carbon-carbon double bond after (4), as the reduction of this bond in the final product differentiates the absinthin monomer from other germacrene A downstream products. This reduction does not necessarily occur at step (4), but may occur further downstream. With the carboxyl and hydroxyl group in position, the guaiano-lactone [C] formation via dehydration (7) can occur, as proposed for a general guaianolide pathway. Formation of the Absinthin sesquiterpene guaianolide monomer [D] from hydroxylation and double bond rearrangement (8,9) is then postulated to directly precede dimerization to Absinthin [E] via a naturally occurring Diels-Alder reaction [10], which is likely facilitated by the associated synthase even though the reaction itself can occur in good yields spontaneously, albeit slower than typical natural product biosynthesis.

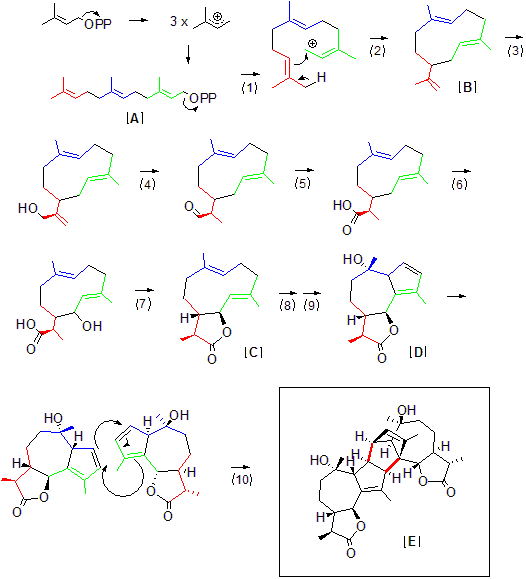
Illustration of the proposed biosynthesis of absinthin as interpreted from similar guaianolide pathways in Artemisia

While no synthases specific to Artemisia absinthium have been sufficiently isolated to recreate this particular sesquiterpene formation in vitro, the general reaction scheme presented here portrays a likely scenario for absinthin biosynthesis through the use of terpene intermediates utilized in the biosynthesis of germacrene A, another sesquiterpene lactone. Enzymatic analogs from terpene biosynthesis which help rationalize the above proposed numbered biosynthetic steps are as follows:

1. Farnesyl diphosphate departure via a generic sesquiterpene synthase
2. Ring closure via a generic sesquiterpene synthase (as for #1)
3. Hydroxylation of terminal allylic carbon via germacrene A hydroxylase, a cytochrome P450 enzyme.
4. Oxidation of alcohol to aldol, via -germacrene A hydroxylase.
5. Hydroxylation of alcohol to carboxyl group, via Germacrene A hydroxylase.
6. NADPH-mediated hydroxylation of allylic carbon via a postulated hydroxylation to precede lactone ring closure
7. Lactone formation/ring closure
8. Hydroxylation at carbon-carbon tertiary double bond.
9. Additional 5-membered ring formation/cyclization
10. Diels-Alder coupling via an unidentified enzyme in Artemisia absinthium.
