= Bäsk =

Swedish style spiced liquor

- Type: Liquor
- Origin: Sweden
- Ingredients: Wormwood

Bäsk is a Swedish-style liquor flavored with wormwood ("malört" in Swedish). Bäsk is an old alternative spelling of the word besk which means "bitter".

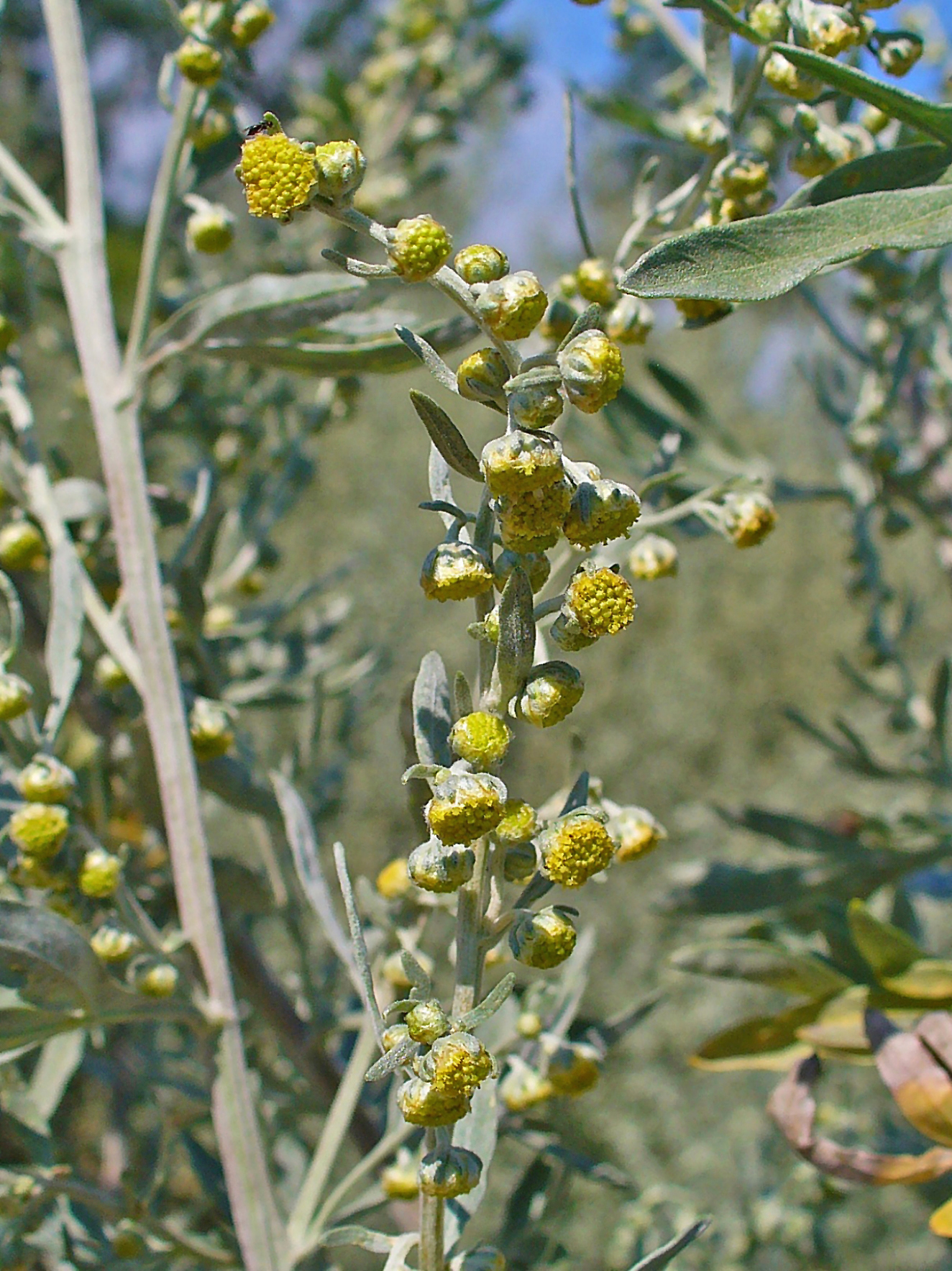
Artemisia absinthium is used to make bäsk and other liquors

In the United States, the Chicago-based brand Jeppson's Malört is one of the best-known versions of the liquor.

In Sweden, the most popular brand is Bäska droppar by O.P. Anderson Distillery.

Warm Bäsk is said to be good for digestion, and therefore is traditionally associated with fatty foods.

== See also ==
- Vermouth
