= Pelinkovac =

Croatian bitter liqueur

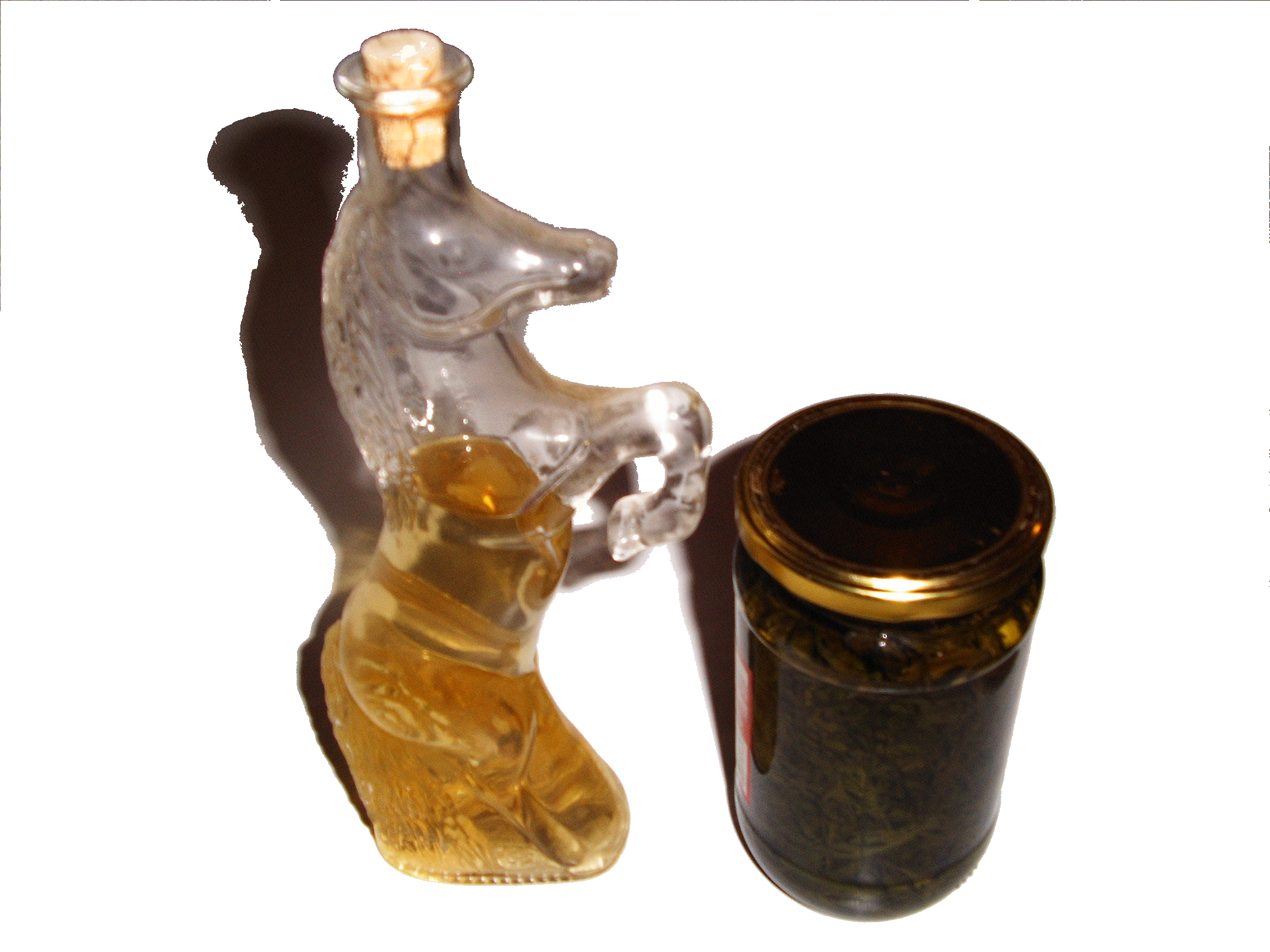
- Pelinkovac is a bitter-sweet liqueur based on wormwood.
- Type: Liqueur
- Origin: Balkans
- Alcohol by volume: 28–35%

Pelinkovac is a bitter-sweet liqueur derived from wormwood. Pelinkovac is a liqueur with a noticeably bitter taste of wormwood, from which it is made, with the addition of 26 different medicinal herbs that enrich it with a specific aroma and pleasant scent. It contains up to 35% alcohol. It is drunk chilled without ice, as an aperitif before and digestif after meals.

== History ==
Before commercialization, the liqueur was used as a home remedy for "cleansing the blood and settling the stomach". Wormwood was believed to stimulate digestion and appetite and to have antiparasitic and antibacterial properties.

Badel's Antique Pelinkovac, a Croatian brand, was created in 1862 by chemist Franjo Pokorny as a digestif. According to maker Antique Herbal Liqueur, it was the first bottled commercial version.

== Description and serving ==
The taste is described as bittersweet and herbal, with a dominant flavour of anise, which is derived from wormwood. It is served neat, on ice, or in cocktails, sometimes garnished with orange.

== Popularity ==
The drink is common throughout the Balkans. In 2021, USA Today named a Croatian brand, Badel’s Antique Pelinkovac, to its list of "15 must-try spirits, liqueurs and canned cocktails".

== Similar liqueurs ==
- Piołunówka, a Polish wormwood liqueur

== See also ==
- Slivovitz
- Absinthe
