= Wormwood (Bible) =

Star or angel which appears in the Book of Revelation

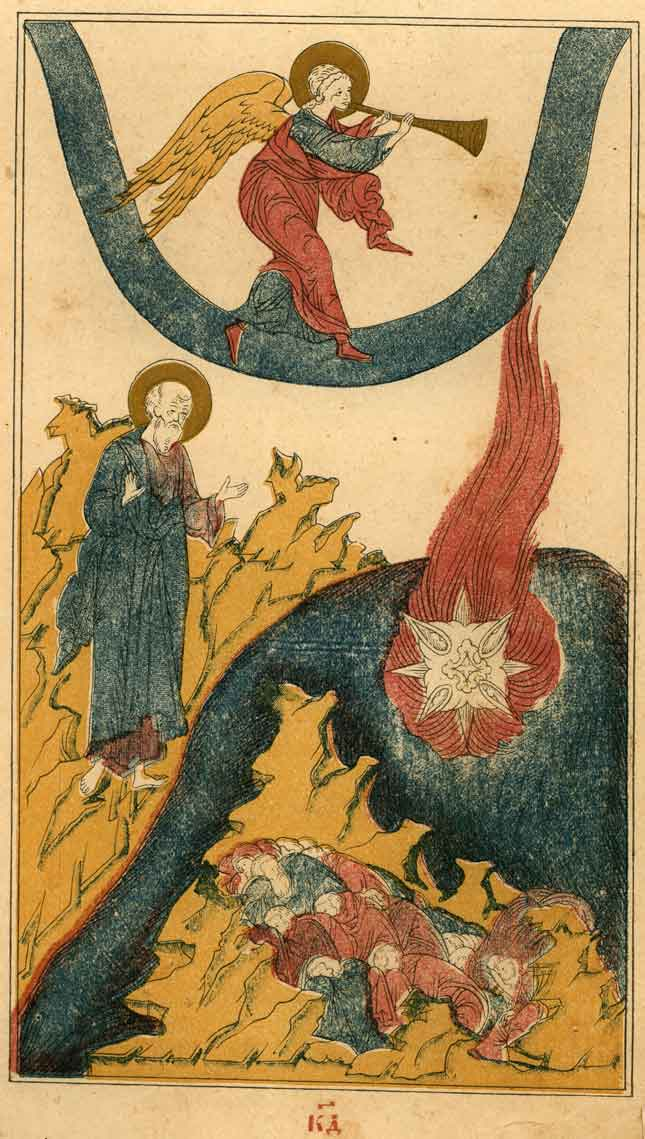
The star Wormwood falls towards the earth (1909 Old Believer illustration)

Wormwood (Ancient Greek: ἀψίνθιον (apsinthion) αψινθος (apsinthos) is a prophesied star or angel which appears in the Book of Revelation.

== Botanical etymology ==
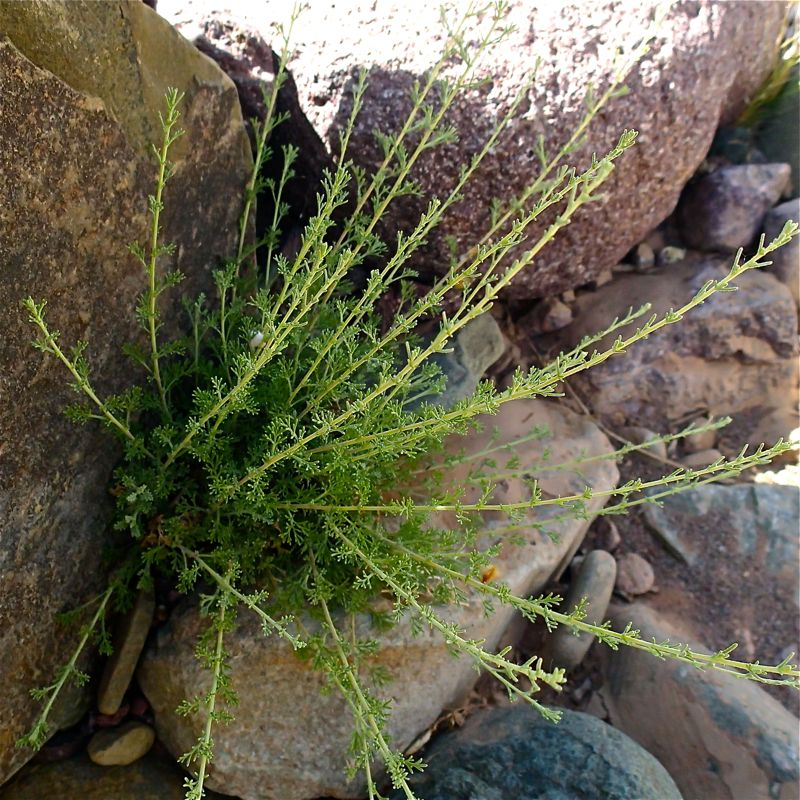
Artemisia herba-alba

Wormwood, translated from αψινθος (Apsinthos) and לענה (la'anah), is historically believed to refer to a plant of the genus Artemisia, likely either A. absinthium or A. herba-alba, used metaphorically to mean something with a bitter taste. The English rendering "wormwood" additionally refers to the dark green oil produced by the plant, which was used to kill intestinal worms. In Revelation, it refers to the water being turned into wormwood, i.e. made bitter.

== Hebrew Bible ==
The Biblical Hebrew word לענה (la'anah), translated into English as "wormwood", occurs nine times in the Hebrew Bible, seven times with the implication of bitterness and twice as a proper noun.

== New Testament ==
The Greek word apsinthos, which is rendered with the English "wormwood", is mentioned only once in the New Testament, in the Book of Revelation:

The third angel blew his trumpet, and a great star fell from heaven, blazing like a torch, and it fell on a third of the rivers and on the springs of water. The name of the star is Wormwood. A third of the waters became wormwood, and many died from the water, because it was made bitter. (Rev 8:10–11)

== Interpretations ==
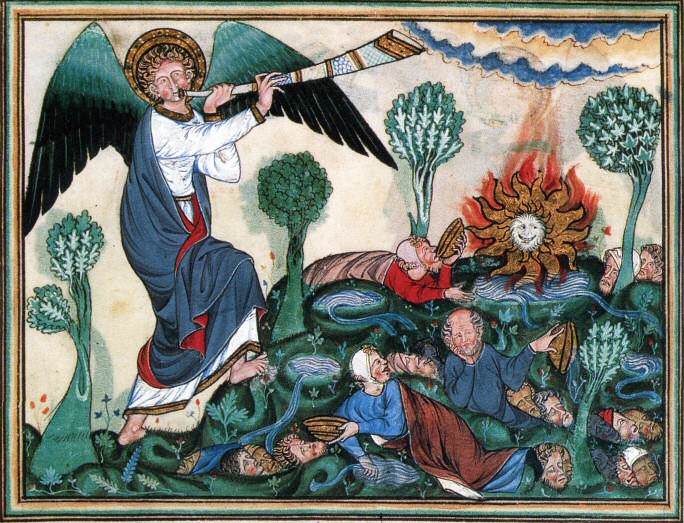
Wormwood strikes the earth (Douce Apocalypse, late 13th century)

Certain commentators have held that this "great star" represents one of several important figures in political or ecclesiastical history: Matthew Henry mentions Augustulus, a 5th-century emperor of the Western Roman Empire, and Pelagius, deemed a heretic at the Council of Ephesus.

Other Bible dictionaries and commentaries view the term as a reference to a celestial being; for example, A Dictionary of the Holy Bible states that "the star called Wormwood seems to denote a mighty prince, or power of the air, the instrument, in its fall".

=== Historicist ===
Various religious groups and figures, including Seventh-day Adventists and the theologians Matthew Henry and John Gill, regard the verses of Revelation 8 as symbolic references to past events in human history. In the case of Wormwood, some historicist interpreters believe it represents the army of the Huns led by Attila, pointing to chronological consistencies between the timeline of prophecy they have accepted and the history of the Huns’ campaign in Europe. Others point to the heretical priest Arius, the Roman Emperor Constantine, Origen, or the ascetic monk Pelagius, who denied the doctrine of original sin.

=== Spiritual ===
The Swedenborgian New Church follows a spiritual interpretation of the star Wormwood based on other passages of scripture which mention gall and wormwood. The star signifies self-derived intelligence which departs from God, thus it falls from heaven. For the star to make the waters of rivers and fountains bitter signifies to falsify spiritual truths, as waters signify truths derived from the Word. In general, the Book of Revelation is seen as a prophecy of the corruption of the Christian churches in the End Times, which is followed by the New Church signified by the New Jerusalem.

=== Alternative interpretations ===
A number of Bible scholars consider the term Wormwood to be a purely symbolic representation of the bitterness that will fill the earth during troubled times, noting that the plant for which Wormwood is named, Artemisia absinthium, or mugwort, Artemisia vulgaris, is a known biblical metaphor for things that are unpalatably bitter.

== Chornóbyl ==
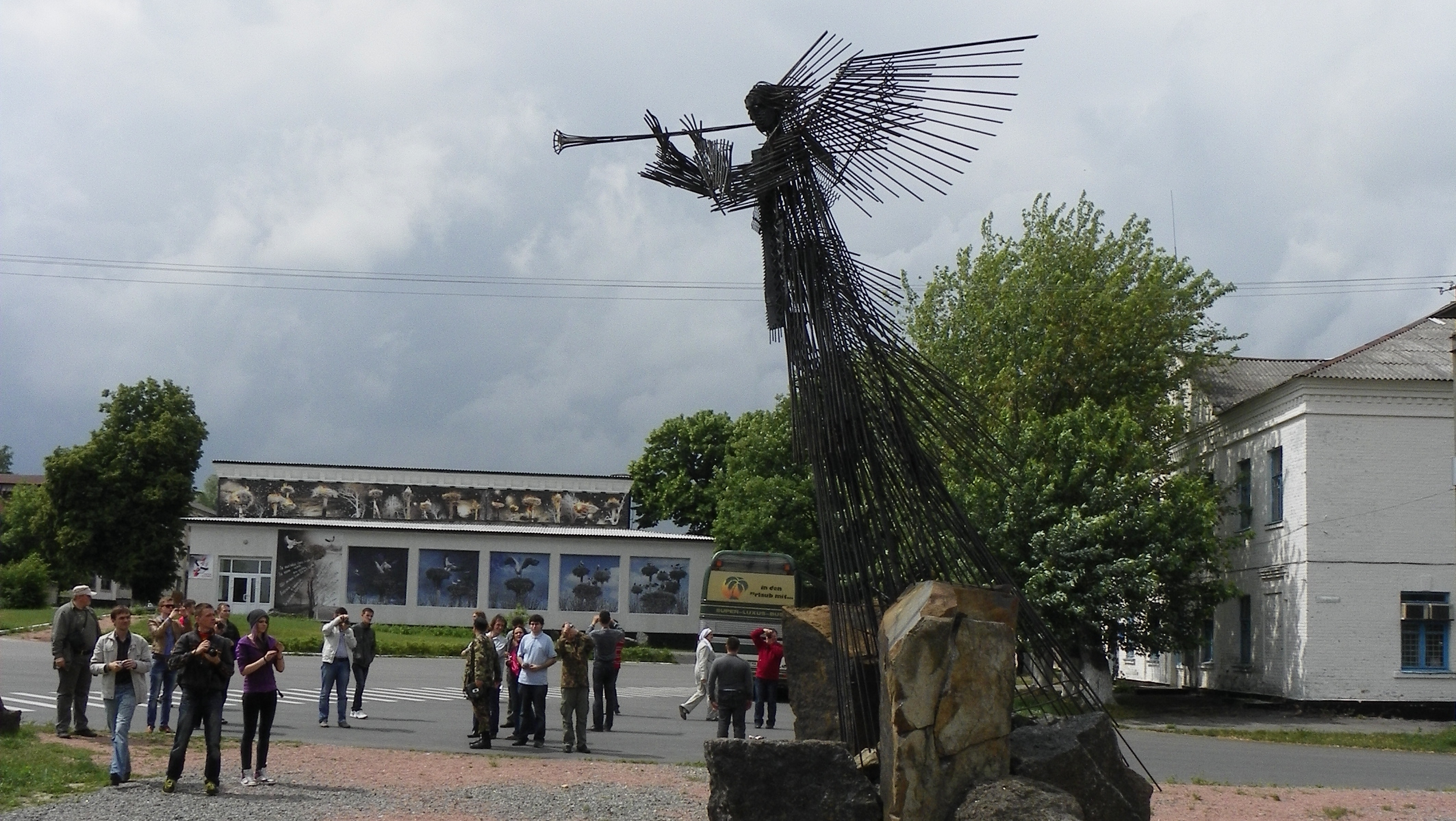
Statue of an angel blowing a trumpet at the Wormwood Star Memorial, Chernobyl

As the Ukrainian term for Artemisia vulgaris is Chornóbyl (Чорнобиль, IPA: [tʃorˈnɔbɪlʲ]), many have used the Chernobyl nuclear disaster in 1986 as definitive proof this specific prophecy in the Book of Revelation is correct. The verses referring to a "star falling down and turning the waters bitter" are interpreted as the radioactive fallout from the disaster poisoning the environment around Chernobyl, leaving it uninhabitable.

In the town centre of Chornóbyl is the Wormwood Star Memorial, which depicts an angel blowing a trumpet in reference to the biblical prophecy.

== See also ==
- List of angels in theology
