= Anyżówka =

Anise-flavoured vodka

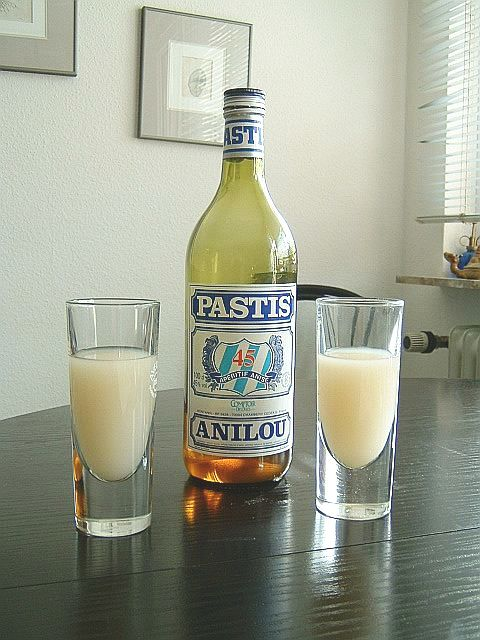

Various flavors of anyżówka or anise-flavoured vodkas if not so popular in Polish noble manors in the 17th CE as other well-known nalewkas, still were popularised probably until the beginning of the 20th CE. Because of their typical sweet taste (as Poles prefer vodkas to be more on the dry side) other brands were preferred over them. After the Great War they have not been re-introduced by commercial producers and nowadays if exquisite, remain forgotten and no one has decided to produce them apart from "Nalewki i inne" (link below).

== Types ==
Dubelt Annis: (the name suggesting it includes both anise varieties)

Recipe

151g of aniseed 101g of star anise 25g of coriander 25g of Florence fennel

Macerate all the ingredients in 6 litres of vodka at 45% for 3 days. Distill the alcoholate once or twice according to your preferences. Add sugar syrup if you like.

Whereas Dubelt Annis requires distillation, more popular and stronger type of anise-flavoured vodka - Edit (exported overseas as Kontuszowka Polnischer Likőr or Kontuczowka Liqueur) requires none.

Kontuszówka (kontusz is a special kind of cloth/robe worn by the Polish nobility).

Recipe

20g of aniseed 10g of star anise 15g of coriander

Macerate all the ingredients in 1 litre at 70% for up to 48 hours, and then sweeten with genuine honey (200 ml).
