= Sage oil =

Steam distillation of Salvia officinalis

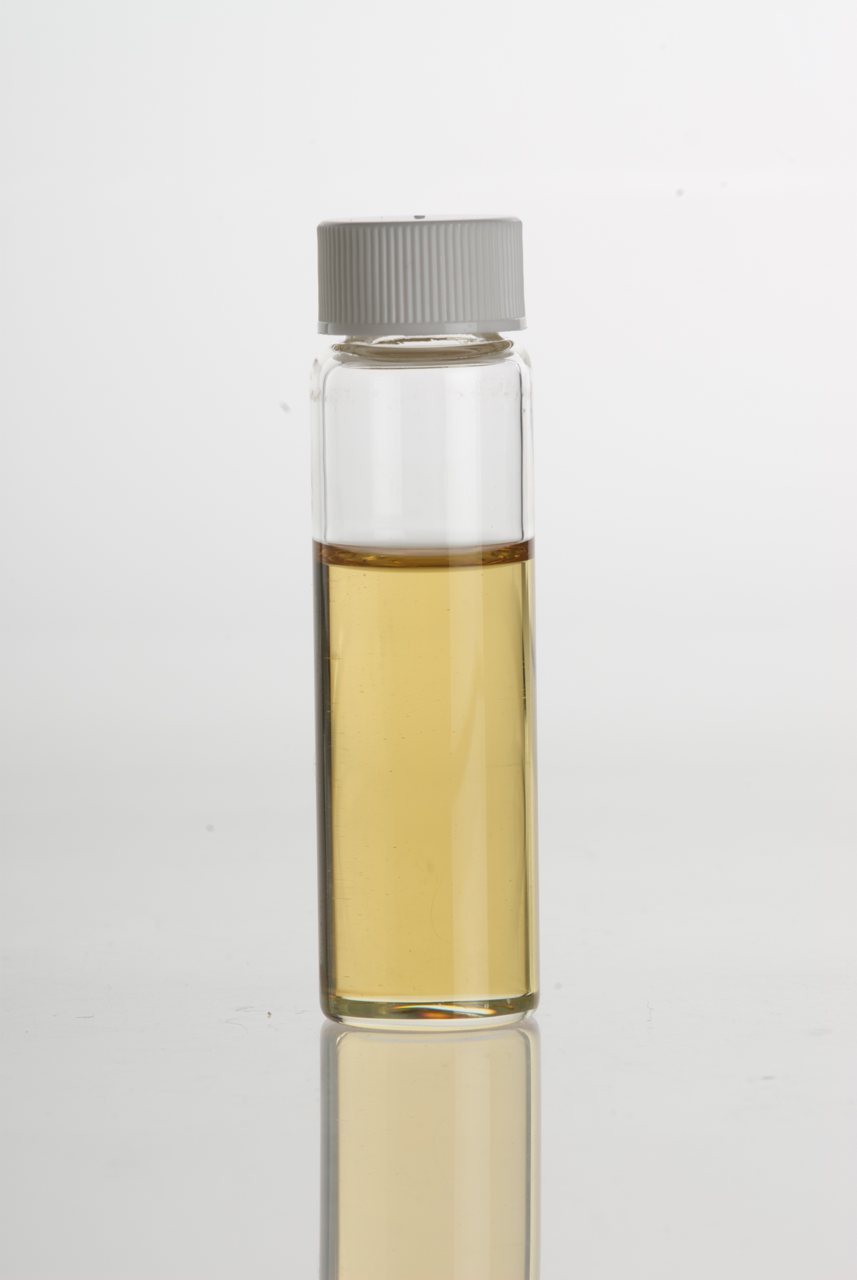
Sage oil

Sage oils are essential oils that come in several varieties:

== Dalmatian sage oil ==
Also called English, Garden, and True sage oil. Made by steam distillation of Salvia officinalis partially dried leaves. Yields range from 0.5 to 1.0%. A colorless to yellow liquid with a warm camphoraceous, thujone-like odor ("thujonic, cedar, eucalyptus, rosemary, juniper, forest") and sharp and bitter taste. The main components of the oil are thujone (50%), camphor, pinene, and cineol.

== Clary sage oil ==
Sometimes called muscatel. Made by steam or water distillation of Salvia sclarea flowering tops and foliage. Yields range from 0.7 to 1.5%. A pale yellow to yellow liquid with a herbaceous odor and a winelike bouquet. Produced in large quantities in France, Russia the United States, and Morocco. The oil contains linalyl acetate, linalool and other terpene alcohols (sclareol), as well as their acetates.

== Spanish sage oil ==
Made by steam distillation of the leaves and twigs of S. officinalis subsp. lavandulifolia (syn. S. lavandulifolia). A colorless to pale yellow liquid with the characteristic camphoraceous odor. Unlike Dalmatian sage oil, Spanish sage oil contains no or only traces of thujone; camphor and eucalyptol are the major components.

== Greek sage oil ==
Made by steam distillation of Salvia triloba leaves. Grows in Greece and Turkey. Yields range from 0.25% to 4%. The oil contains camphor, thujone, and pinene, the dominant component being eucalyptol.

== Judaean sage oil ==
Made by steam distillation of Salvia judaica leaves. The oil contains mainly cubebene and ledol.
