= Stefan Falimierz =

16th-century Polish physician and botanist

Stefan Falimierz, or Stefan Falimirz, was a Polish physician and botanist. He served at the court of the voivode Jan Tęczyński in Kraśnik. Falimierz is known for his 1534 work On Herbs and Their Potency (O ziolach y o moczy gich). The book has been described, as "one of the most lavishly illustrated volumes published in Poland in the early sixteenth century", and "also the first real encyclopedia of natural science in Polish". Among other topics, it includes recipes for preparing various types of nalewka.
