= Maceration (wine) =

Winemaking process

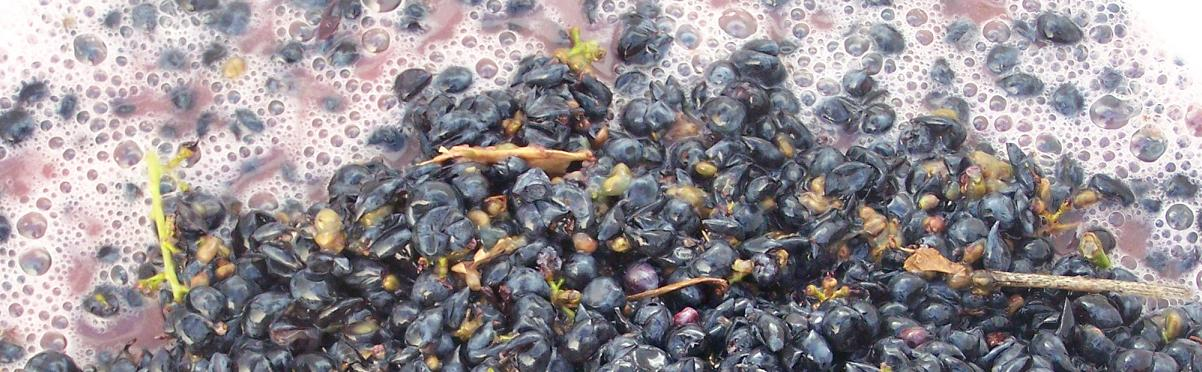
Cabernet Sauvignon musts interact with the skins during fermentation to add color, tannins and flavor to the wine.

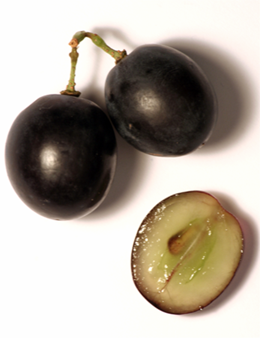
Most red wine grapes have their color concentrated in the skin, while the juice is much lighter in color. The duration of contact between the crushed grape skins and their juice impacts the final color and flavor profile.

Maceration is the winemaking process where the phenolic materials of the grape—tannins, coloring agents (anthocyanins) and flavor compounds—are leached from the grape skins, seeds and stems into the must. To macerate is to soften by soaking, and maceration is the process by which the red wine receives its red color, since raw grape juice (with the exceptions of teinturiers) is clear-grayish in color. In the production of white wines, maceration is either avoided or allowed only in very limited manner in the form of a short amount of skin contact with the juice prior to pressing. This is more common in the production of varietals with less natural flavor and body structure like Sauvignon blanc and Sémillon. For Rosé, red wine grapes are allowed some maceration between the skins and must, but not to the extent of red wine production.

While maceration is a technique usually associated with wine, it is used with other drinks, such as Lambic, piołunówka, Campari and crème de cassis, and also used to steep unflavored spirit with herbs for making herb-based alcohol like absinthe.

== Process ==
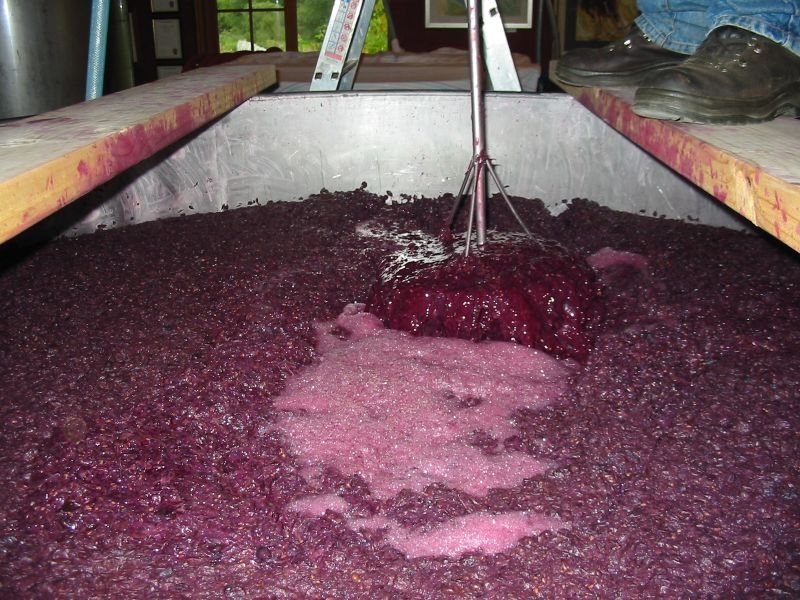
The "cap" of grape skins being "punched down" to maximize maceration.

The process of maceration begins, to varying extent, as soon as the grapes' skins are broken and exposed to some degree of heat. Temperature is the guiding force, with higher temperatures encouraging more breakdown and extraction of phenols from the skins and other grape materials. Maceration continues during the fermentation period, and can last well past the point when the yeast has converted all sugars into alcohol. The process itself is a slow one with compounds such as the anthocyanins needing to pass through the cell membrane of the skins to come into contact with the wine. During fermentation, higher temperatures and higher alcohol levels can encourage this process with the alcohol acting as a solvent to assist in the breakdown of the organic compounds within the grape materials. This process seems to slow once the wine reaches an alcohol level of 10%.

Throughout the fermentation process, carbon dioxide is released as a byproduct of the conversion of sugar into alcohol. The carbon dioxide seeks to escape from the must by rising to the top of the mixture, pushing the grape skins and other materials to the top as well. This forms what is known as a cap that is visible on top of the fermentation vessel. At this point, a very limited amount of the must comes into contact with the skins, and winemakers seek to correct this by pushing down the cap (either with equipment or the traditional method of treading with their feet) or by pumping wine out from under and over onto the cap. This process of "pumping over" or "punching down" the cap is done often throughout the fermentation process, depending on the extent of maceration the winemaker desires. An efficient and modern method of maceration is the "pneumatage process" in which compressed air or gas is sequentially injected into the juice. The bubbles created during the pneumatage process uses gravity and the weight of the juice to circulate the wine juice with the cap of skins and grape solids allowing for greater extraction of aroma, coloring agents and tannins to diffuse into the wine juice ("must").

== Benefits ==
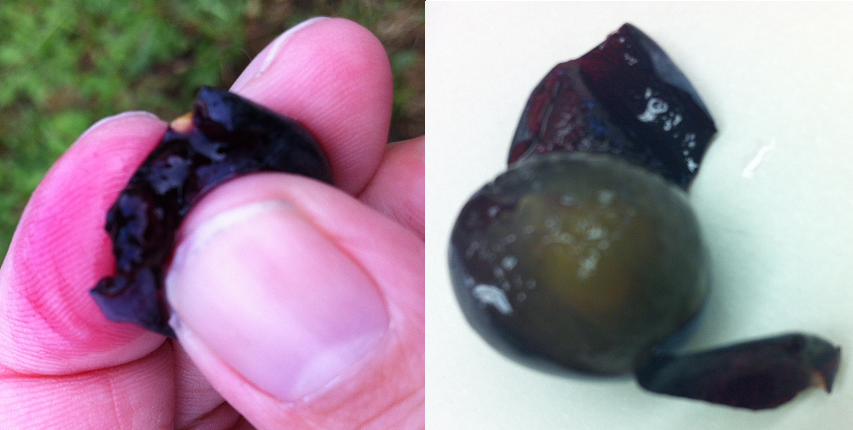
An example of the difference between a red fleshed teinturier grape (Agria left) and a red wine grape variety with its skin peeled off to show that its flesh and juice is naturally white (Grenache right). The vast majority of red wine grapes are like the Grenache on the right with the red color of wine coming from skin contact during winemaking.

Depending on the varietal, the process of maceration can help bring out many flavors in the wine that would otherwise be lacking. It can enhance the body and mouthfeel for many wines, as well as strengthen the color. Greater extraction can add to the complexity and life expectancy of the wine by developing more complex tannins that will soften over a longer period of time. With these benefits does come the risk of developing various wine faults, such as the development of acetic (or "volatile") acidity. Too much extraction can also increase the harshness of some tannins to where the wine is not very approachable to most wine drinkers.

== Other processes ==
One classical method of maceration is grape treading or pigeage, where grapes are crushed in vats by barefoot workers.

The process of cold maceration or cold soak is where temperatures of the fermenting must are kept low to encourage extraction by water and added sulfur dioxide rather than relying principally on heat and alcohol to act as a solvent. This technique was popular in the production of Burgundy wines in the 1970s and 1980s but there is still some debate among oenologists about the overall benefits to and resulting quality of the wine.

Carbonic maceration is the fermentation of whole clusters of unbroken grapes in an atmosphere saturated with carbon dioxide, which prevents traditional yeast fermentation. It is a process different from what is commonly referred to in winemaking as "maceration".

== See also ==
- Maceration (cooking)
