= Thujone =

Group of four possible stereoisomers found in various plants: a.o., absinthe and mint

(−)-α-Thujone
(+)-β-Thujone
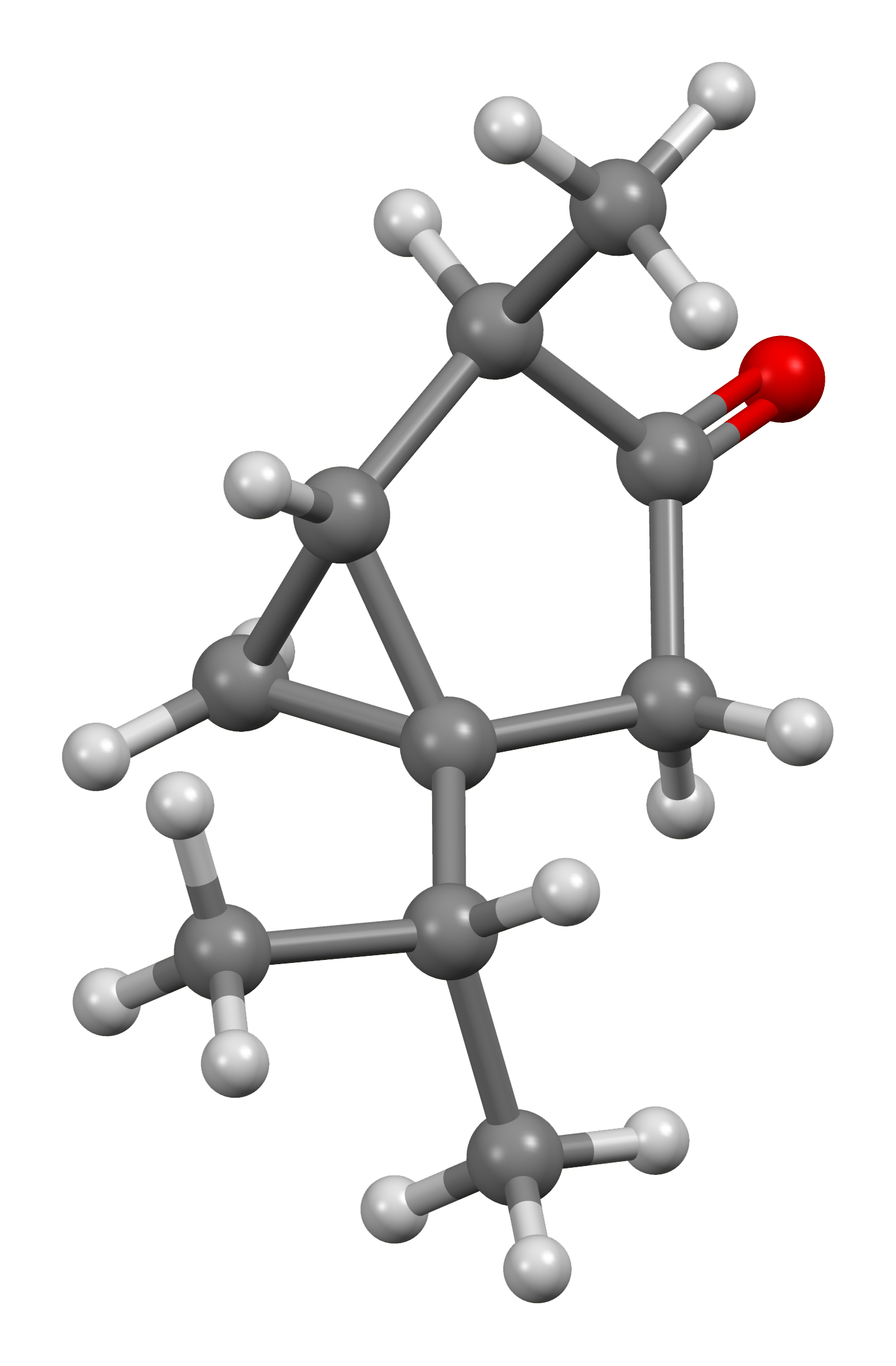
- Ball-and-stick model of (−)-α-thujone

Names
- IUPAC names α: (1S,4R,5R)-4-Methyl-1-(propan-2-yl)bicyclo[3.1.0]hexan-3-one β: (1S,4S,5R)-4-methyl-1-propan-2-ylbicyclo[3.1.0]hexan-3-one
- Other names Bicyclo[3.1.0]hexan-3-one, 4-methyl-1-(1-methylethyl)-, [1S-(1α,4α,5α)]- α-Thujone β-Thujone; Thujone, cis 3-Thujanone, (1S,4R,5R)-(−)- Thujon; 3-Thujanone, (−)- l-Thujone; 4-Methyl-1-(1-methylethyl)bicyclo[3.1.0]hexan-3-one-, (1S,4R,5R)- 3-Thujone; cis-Thujone (Z)-Thujone (−)-Thujone; Bicyclo(3.1.0)hexan-3-one, 4-methyl-1-(1-methylethyl)-, (1S,4R,5R)- NSC 93742; 1-isopropyl-4-methylbicyclo[3.1.0]hexan-3-one

Identifiers
CAS Number	76231-76-0 (α,β-thujone); 546-80-5 (α-thujone); 471-15-8 (β-thujone)
3D model (JSmol)	(α-thujone): Interactive image; (β-thujone): Interactive image
Beilstein Reference	4660369
ChEBI	CHEBI:9577
ChEMBL	ChEMBL1444078
ChemSpider	229574 (α-thujone); 82583 (β-thujone)
ECHA InfoCard	100.013.096
EC Number	214-405-7
IUPHAR/BPS	5344
KEGG	C09906
PubChem CID	261491; 11027
UNII	86HK1QRJ4K (α,β-thujone); R0SQ9G0DU5 (α-thujone); 8ZI5R3T54Q (β-thujone)
CompTox Dashboard (EPA)	DTXSID20859476
- InChI: InChI=1S/C10H16O/c1-6(2)10-4-8(10)7(3)9(11)5-10/h6-8H,4-5H2,1-3H3/t7-,8-,10+/m1/s1 Key: USMNOWBWPHYOEA-MRTMQBJTSA-N; InChI=1/C10H16O/c1-6(2)10-4-8(10)7(3)9(11)5-10/h6-8H,4-5H2,1-3H3/t7-,8-,10+/m1/s1 Key: USMNOWBWPHYOEA-MRTMQBJTBZ; InChI=1S/C10H16O/c1-6(2)10-4-8(10)7(3)9(11)5-10/h6-8H,4-5H2,1-3H3/t7-,8-,10+/m1/s1 Key: USMNOWBWPHYOEA-MRTMQBJTSA-N
- SMILES: (α-thujone): O=C1[C@H](C)[C@@H]2[C@](C(C)C)(C1)C2; (β-thujone): C[C@@H]([C@@H](C2)[C@]2([C@@H](C)C)C1)C1=O

Properties
Chemical formula	C_{10}H_{16}O
Molar mass	152.237 g·mol^{−1}
Density	0.92 g/cm^{3} (β-thujone); 0.9116 g/cm^{3} (α-thujone)
Melting point	<25 °C
Boiling point	203 °C (397 °F; 476 K) (alpha,beta-thujone)
Solubility in water	407 mg/L

Hazards
- GHS labelling
Pictograms	(GHS07: Exclamation mark)
Signal word	Warning
Hazard statements	H302
Precautionary statements	P264, P270, P301+P312, P330, P501
- Except where otherwise noted, data are given for materials in their standard state (at 25 °C [77 °F], 100 kPa). verify (what is ?) Infobox references

Thujone (/ˈθuːdʒoʊn/) is a ketone and a monoterpene that occurs predominantly in two diastereomeric (epimeric) forms: (−)-α-thujone and (+)-β-thujone.

Though it is best known as a chemical compound in the spirit absinthe, it is only present in trace amounts and is unlikely to be responsible for the spirit's purported stimulant and psychoactive effects.

Thujone acts on the GABA_{A} receptor as an antagonist. As a competitive antagonist of GABA_{A} receptor, thujone alone is considered to be convulsant, though by interfering with the inhibitory transmitter GABA, it may convey stimulating, mood-elevating effects at low doses. It is also found in perfumery as a component of several essential oils.

In addition to the naturally occurring (−)-α-thujone and (+)-β-thujone, two other forms are possible: (+)-α-thujone and (−)-β-thujone. In 2016, they were found in nature as well, in Salvia officinalis.

(−)-α-thujone

(+)-α-thujone

(+)-β-thujone

(−)-β-thujone

== Sources ==
Alpha and beta thujones are found in a number of plants, such as arborvitae (genus Thuja, hence the derivation of the name), Nootka cypress, some junipers, mugwort, oregano, common sage (sage oil contain more than 20% from alpha and beta thujones), tansy, and wormwood, most notably grand wormwood (Artemisia absinthium), usually as a mix of isomers in a 1:2 ratio. It is also found in various species of Mentha (mint). The aroma of alpha and beta thujones are characteristically "thujonic".

== Biosynthesis ==
The biosynthesis of thujone is similar to the synthesis of other monoterpenes and begins with the formation of geranyl diphosphate (GPP) from dimethylallyl pyrophosphate (DMAPP) and isopentenyl diphosphate (IPP), catalyzed by the enzyme geranyl diphosphate synthase. Quantitative ^{13}C NMR spectroscopic analysis has demonstrated that the isoprene units used to form thujone in plants are derived from the methylerythritol phosphate pathway (MEP).

The reactions that generate the thujone skeleton in sabinene from GPP are mediated by the enzyme sabinene synthase which has GPP as its substrate. GPP (1) first isomerizes to linally diphosphate (LPP) (2) and neryl diphosphate (NPP) (3). LPP preferentially forms a delocalized allylic cation-diphosphate (4). The ion-pair intermediate then cyclizes in an electrophilic addition to yield the α-terpinyl tertiary cation (5).

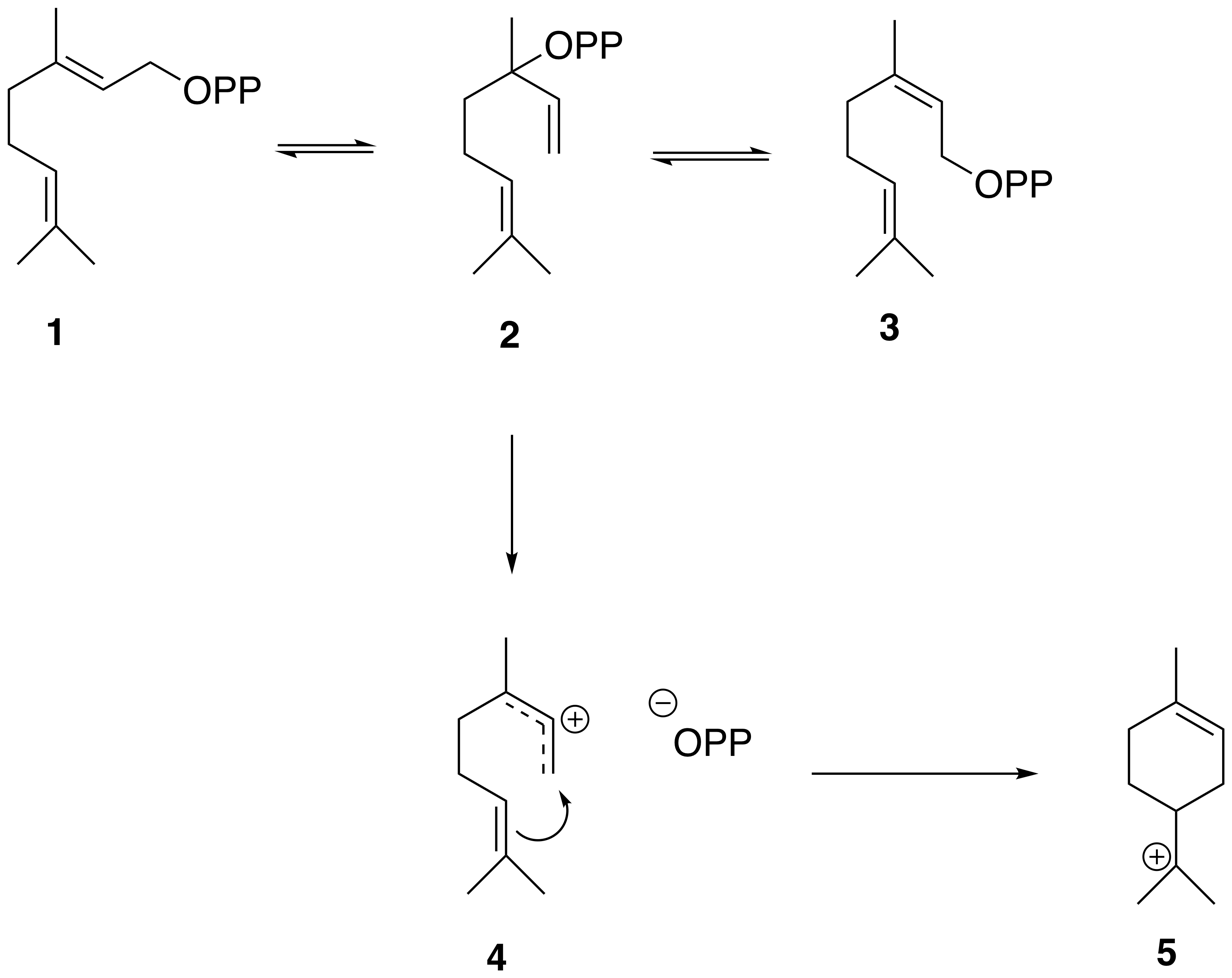
The conversion of GPP to alpha-terpinyl cation.

The α-terpinyl cation (5) then undergoes a 1,2 hydride shift via a Wagner–Meerwein rearrangement, leading to the formation of the terpinen-4-yl cation (6). This cation undergoes a second cyclization to form the thujyl cation intermediate (7) before loss of a proton to form the thujone precursor, (+)-sabinene (8).

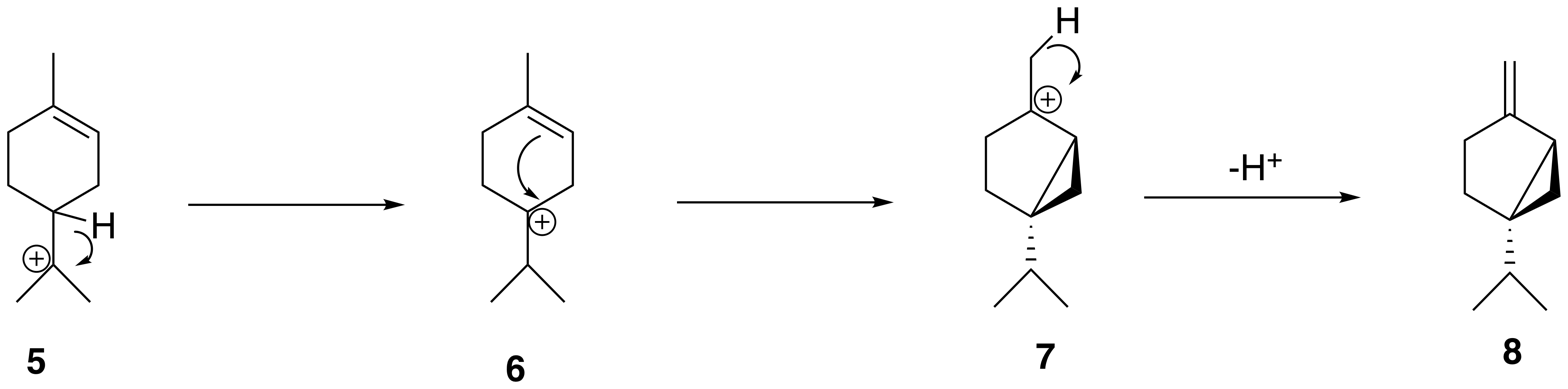
The conversion of alpha-terpinyl cation to (+)-sabinene

From (+)-sabinene (8), the proposed biosynthetic route to generate thujone follows a three-step pathway: (+)-sabinene is first oxidized to an isomer of (+)-sabinol (9-1, 9-2) by a cytochrome P450 enzyme, followed by conversion to (+)-sabinone (10) via a dehydrogenase. Finally, a reductase mediates the conversion to α-thujone (11-1) and β-thujone (11-2). The isomerism of the (+)-sabinol intermediate varies among thujone-producing plants; for instance, in the western redcedar (Thuja plicata), thujone is derived exclusively from the (+)-trans-sabinol intermediate (9-1) whereas in the common garden sage (Salvia officinalis), thujone is formed from the (+)-cis-sabinol intermediate (9-2).

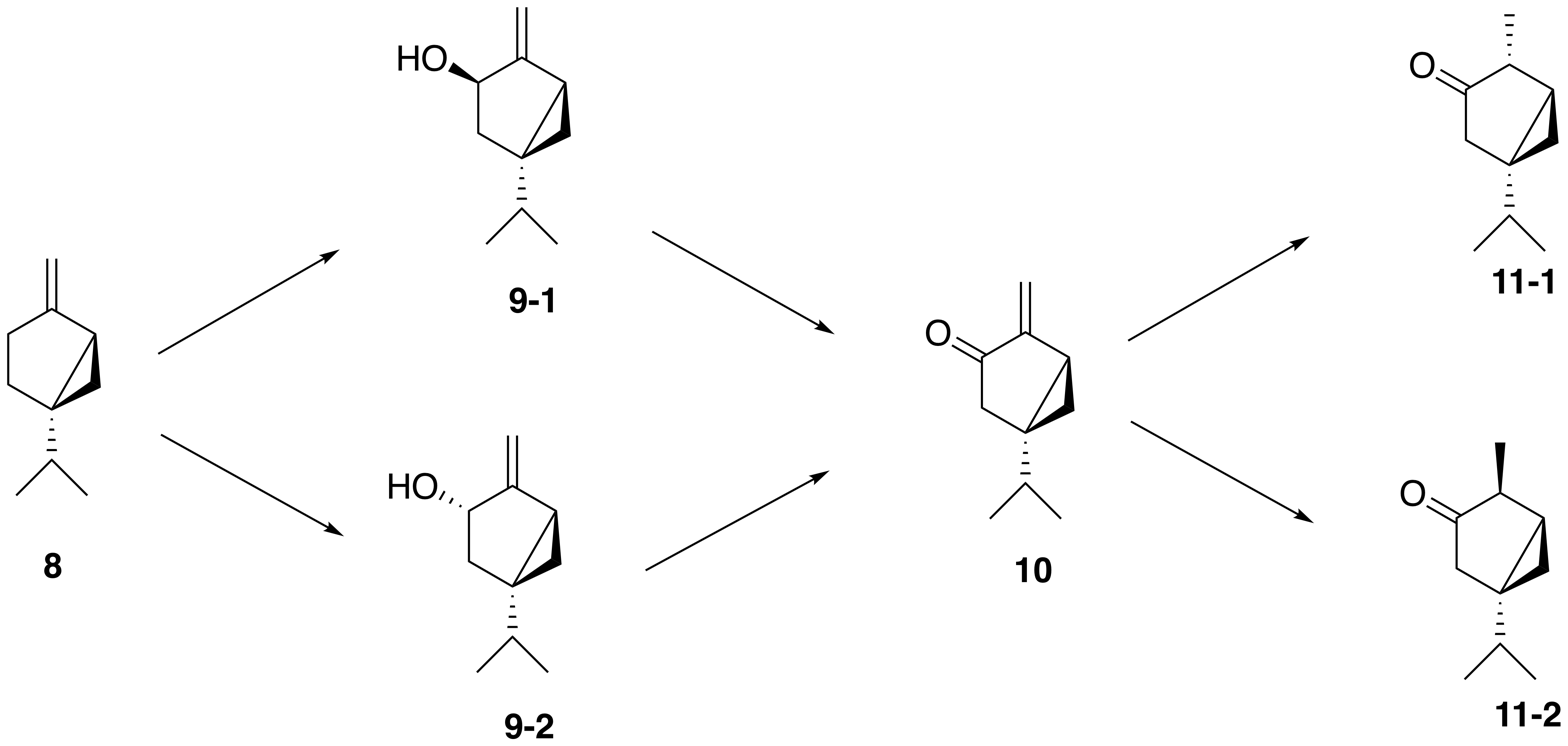
Proposed synthesis of thujone from sabinene

== Pharmacology ==
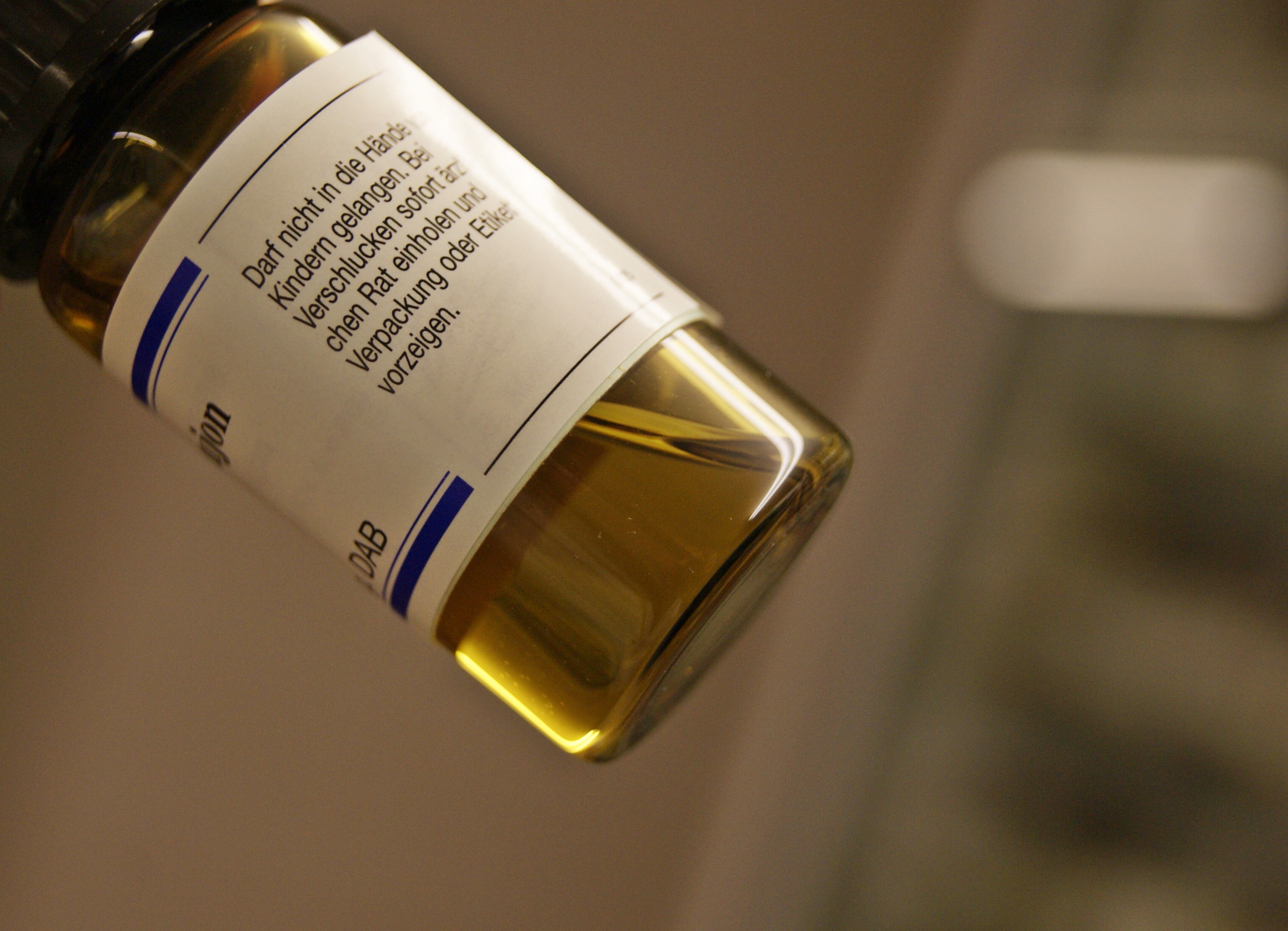
Research-grade thujone

Based on a hypothesis that considered only molecular shape, it was speculated that thujone might act similarly to THC on the cannabinoid receptors; however, thujone failed to evoke a cannabimimetic response in a 1999 investigative study. Thujone is a GABA_{A} receptor antagonist and, more specifically, a GABA_{A} receptor competitive antagonist. By inhibiting GABA receptor activation, neurons may fire more easily, which can cause muscle spasms and convulsions. This interaction with the GABA_{A} receptor is specific to alpha-thujone. Thujone is also a 5-HT_{3} antagonist.

The median lethal dose, or LD_{50}, of α-thujone, the more active of the two isomers, in mice, is around 45 mg/kg, with 0% mortality rate at 30 mg/kg and 100% at 60 mg/kg. Mice exposed to the higher dose have convulsions that lead to death within 1 minute. From 30 to 45 mg/kg, the mice experience muscle spasms in the legs, which progress to general convulsions until death or recovery. These effects are in line with other GABA antagonists. Also, α-thujone is metabolized quickly in the liver in mice. Pretreatment with GABA positive allosteric modulators like diazepam, phenobarbital, or 1 g/kg of ethanol protects against a lethal dose of 100 mg/kg.

Attention performance has been tested with low and high doses of thujone in alcohol. The high dose had a short-term negative effect on attention performance. The lower dose showed no noticeable effect.

Thujone is reported to be toxic to brain, kidney, and liver cells and could cause convulsions if used in too high a dose. Other thujone-containing plants such as the tree arborvitae (Thuja occidentalis) are used in herbal medicine, mainly for their alleged immune-system stimulating effects. Side effects from the essential oil of this plant include anxiety, sleeplessness, and convulsions, which confirms the central nervous system effects of thujone.

== In absinthe ==
Thujone is most commonly known for being a compound in the spirit absinthe. In the past, absinthe was thought to contain up to 260–350 mg/L thujone, but modern tests have shown this estimate to be far too high. A 2008 study of 13 pre-ban (1895–1910) bottles using gas chromatography–mass spectrometry (GC-MS) found that the bottles had between 0.5 and 48.3 mg/L and averaged 25.4 mg/L A 2005 study recreated three 1899 high-wormwood recipes and tested with GC–MS, and found that the highest contained 4.3 mg/L thujone. GC–MS testing is important in this capacity because gas chromatography alone may record an inaccurately high reading of thujone as other compounds may interfere with and add to the apparent measured amount.

=== History ===
The compound was discovered after absinthe became popular in the mid-19th century. Valentin Magnan, who studied alcoholism, tested pure wormwood oil on animals and discovered it caused seizures independent from the effects of alcohol. On this basis, absinthe, which contains a small amount of wormwood oil, was assumed to be more dangerous than ordinary alcohol. Eventually, thujone was isolated as the cause of these reactions. Magnan went on to study 250 abusers of alcohol and noted that those who drank absinthe had seizures and hallucinations. The seizures are caused by the (+)-α-thujone interacting with the GABA receptors, causing epileptic activity. In light of modern evidence, these conclusions are questionable, as they are based on a poor understanding of other compounds and diseases, and clouded by Magnan's belief that alcohol and absinthe were degenerating the French race.

After absinthe was banned, research dropped off until the 1970s, when the British scientific journal Nature published an article comparing the molecular shape of thujone to tetrahydrocannabinol (THC), the primary psychoactive substance found in cannabis, and hypothesized it would act the same way on the brain, sparking the myth that thujone was a cannabinoid.

More recently, following European Council Directive No. 88/388/EEC (1988) allowing certain levels of thujone in foodstuffs in the EU, the studies described above were conducted and found only minute levels of thujone in absinthe.

== Regulations ==
=== European Union ===
Maximum thujone levels in the EU are:

- 0.5 mg/kg in food prepared with Artemisia species, excluding those prepared with sage and non-alcoholic beverages
- 10 mg/kg in alcoholic beverages not prepared with Artemisia species
- 25 mg/kg in food prepared with sage
- 35 mg/kg in alcoholic beverages prepared with Artemisia species

=== United States ===
In the United States, the addition of pure thujone to foods is not permitted. Foods or beverages that contain Artemisia species, white cedar, oakmoss, tansy, or yarrow, must be thujone-free, which in practice means that they contain less than 10 parts per million thujone. Other herbs that contain thujone have no restrictions. For example, sage and sage oil (which can be up to 50% thujone) are on the Food and Drug Administration's list of generally recognized as safe (GRAS) substances.

Absinthe offered for sale in the United States must be thujone-free by the same standard that applies to other beverages containing Artemisia, so absinthe with small amounts of thujone may be legally imported.

=== Canada ===
In Canada, liquor laws are the domain of the provincial governments. Alberta, Ontario, and Nova Scotia allow 10 mg/kg thujone; Quebec allows 15 mg per kg; Manitoba allows 6–8 mg thujone per litre; British Columbia adheres to the same levels as Ontario. However, in Saskatchewan and Quebec, one can purchase any liquor available in the world upon the purchase of a maximum of one case, usually 12 750-ml bottles or 9 L. The individual liquor boards must approve each product before it may be sold on shelves.

== See also ==
- Piołunówka – Polish alcoholic preparation with thujone content higher than in absinthe
