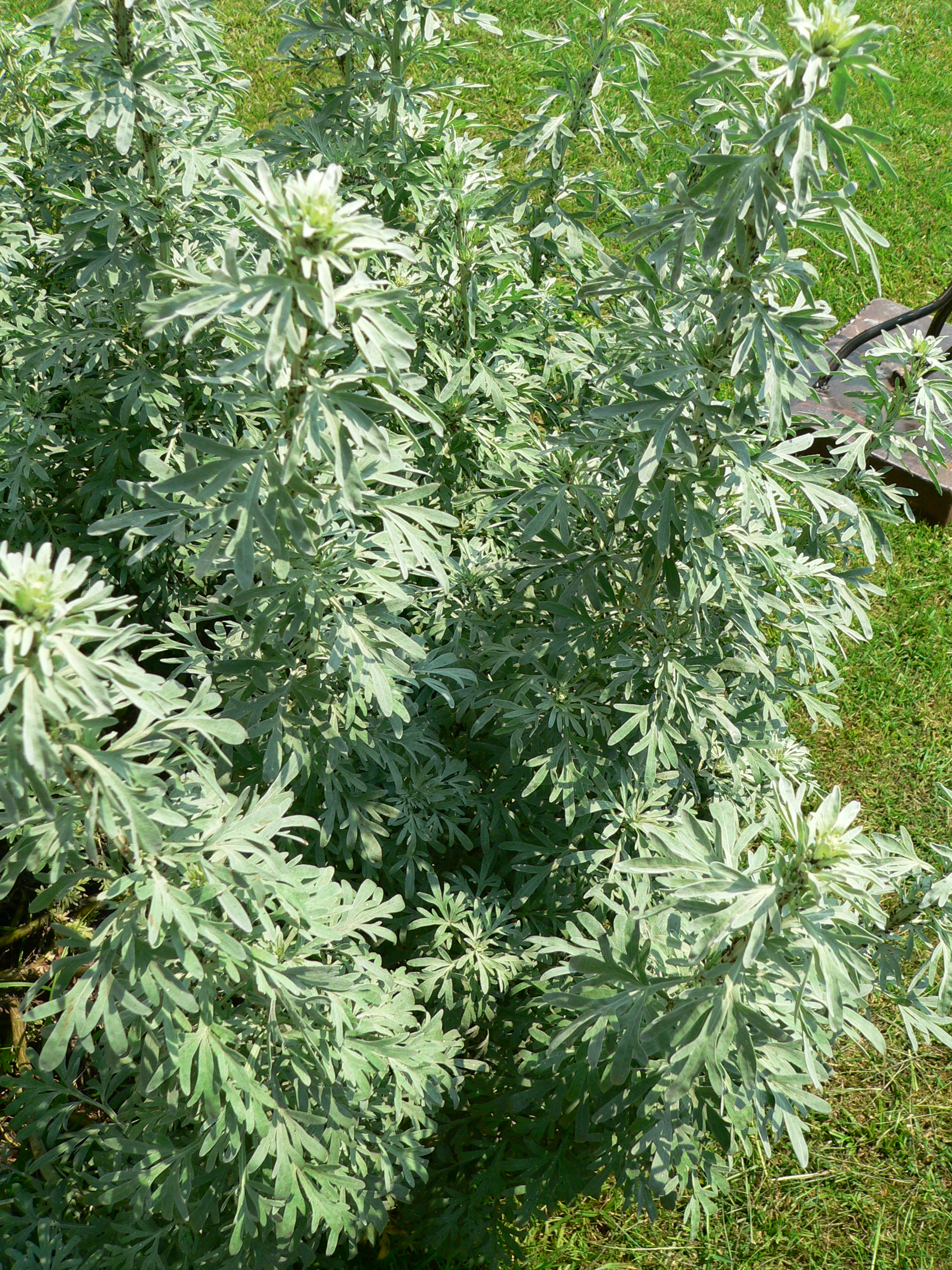
- Absinthe Museum garden, Auvers-sur-Oise, France

Scientific classification
- Kingdom: Plantae
- Clade: Tracheophytes
- Clade: Angiosperms
- Clade: Eudicots
- Clade: Asterids
- Order: Asterales
- Family: Asteraceae
- Genus: Artemisia
- Species: A. absinthium

Binomial name
- Artemisia absinthium L.

Synonyms
- List: Absinthium bipedale Gilib., not validly published; Absinthium majus Geoffr.; Absinthium majus Garsault, not validly published; Absinthium officinale Lam.; Absinthium officinale Brot.; Absinthium vulgare (L.) Lam.; Artemisia absinthia St.-Lag.; Artemisia arborescens var. cupaniana Chiov.; Artemisia arborescens f. rehan (Chiov.) Chiov.; Artemisia baldaccii Degen; Artemisia doonense Royle; Artemisia inodora Mill.; Artemisia kulbadica Boiss. & Buhse; Artemisia pendula Salisb.; Artemisia rehan Chiov.; Artemisia rhaetica Brügger

= Artemisia absinthium =

Species of plant

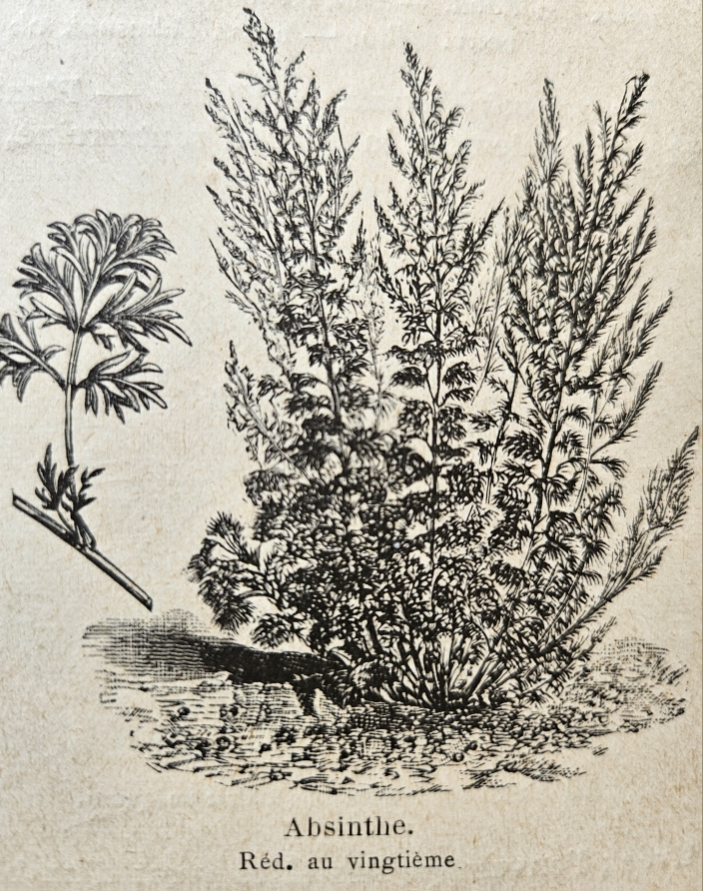
Illustration of wormwood (Artemisia absinthium) in "Les plantes potagères" Vilmorin 1925

Artemisia absinthium, otherwise known as common wormwood, is a species of Artemisia native to North Africa and temperate regions of Eurasia, and widely naturalized in Canada and the northern United States. It is grown as an ornamental plant and is used as an ingredient in the spirit absinthe and some other alcoholic beverages.

== Etymology ==
Wormwood's relative mugwort was traditionally used as a remedy for a variety of complaints, especially those of a gynaecological nature, and so the wormwood genus bears the name of the Greek goddess of childbirth, Artemis. The specific name derives from apsínthion, the Greek term for the plant.

"Wormwood" itself is an alteration of Old English wermod, which is of obscure origin. The German cognate Wermut is the source of the term vermouth, used in French and English to describe a kind of wine traditionally flavoured with wormwood.

== Description ==
A. absinthium is a herbaceous perennial plant with fibrous roots. The stems are straight, growing to 0.8–1.2 m (2 ft 7 in – 3 ft 11 in) (and rarely over 1.5 metres (4 ft 11 in)) tall, grooved, branched, and silvery-green with a strong odor.

Leaves are spirally arranged, greenish-grey colored above, white below, covered with silky silvery-white trichomes, and bearing minute oil-producing glands. The basal leaves are up to 250 mm (10 in) long, bi- to tripinnate with long petioles, with the cauline leaves (those on the stem) smaller, 50–100 mm (2–4 in) long, less divided, and with short petioles. The uppermost leaves can be both simple and sessile (without a petiole).

Flowers are pale yellow, tubular, and clustered in spherical bent-down heads (capitula), which are in turn clustered in leafy and branched panicles. Flowering occurs from early summer to early autumn; pollination is anemophilous. The fruit is a small achene. Seed dispersal occurs by gravity.

A. absinthium grows naturally on uncultivated arid ground, on rocky slopes, and at the edge of footpaths and fields. Although once relatively common, it is becoming increasingly rare in Britain, where it has recently been suggested to be an archaeophyte rather than a true native.

== Cultivation ==
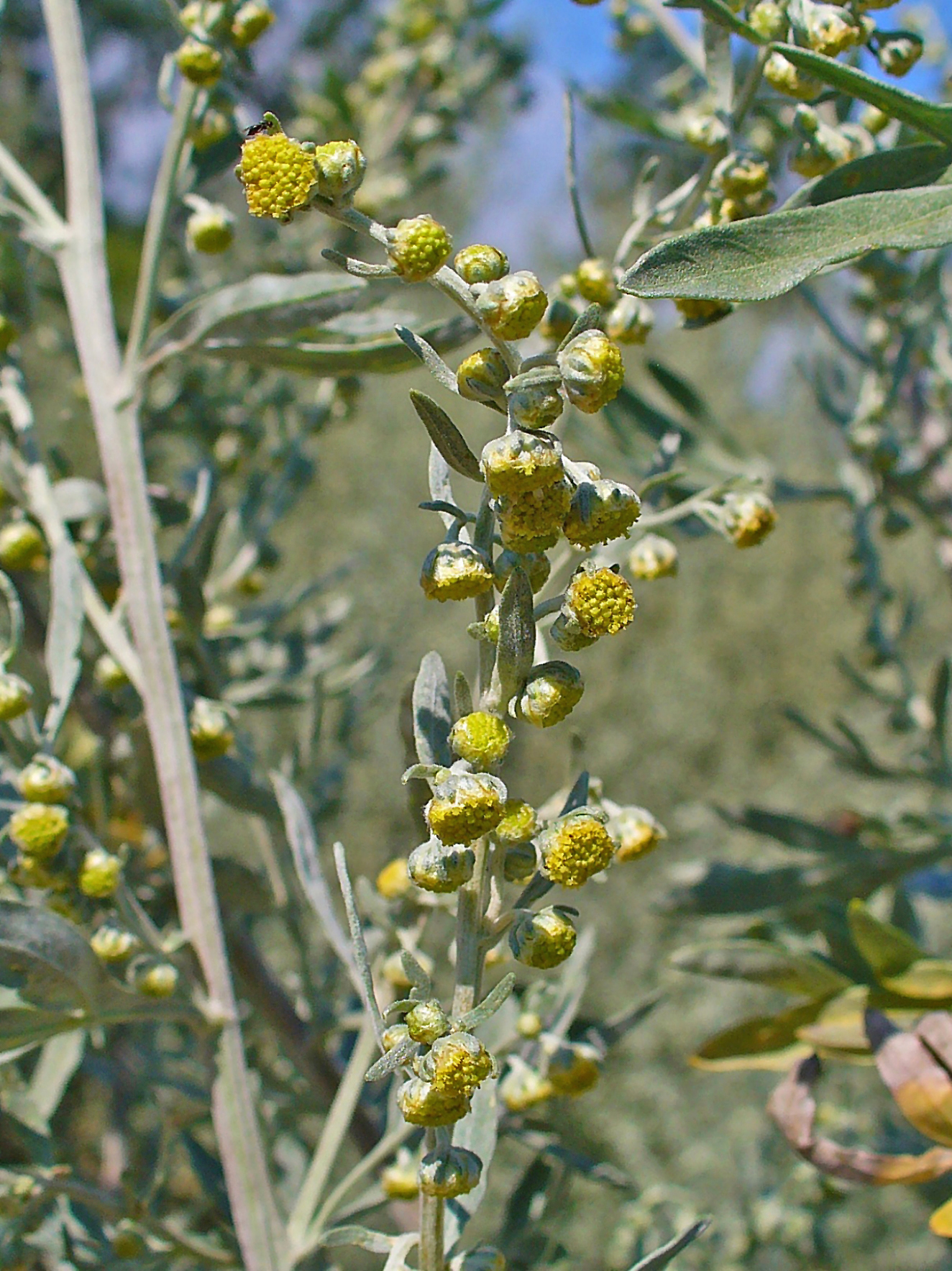
A. absinthium inflorescences

The plant can easily be cultivated in dry soil. It should be planted under bright exposure in fertile, midweight soil. It prefers soil rich in nitrogen, and can be propagated by ripened cuttings taken in spring or autumn in temperate climates, or by seeds in nursery beds. Growing the plant with others tends to stunt their growth; accordingly, it is not considered to be a good companion plant. A. absinthium also self-seeds generously. It is naturalised in some areas away from its native range, including much of North America and the Kashmir Valley of India.

This plant, and its cultivars "Lambrook Mist" and "Lambrook Silver" have gained the Royal Horticultural Society's Award of Garden Merit. These two short cultivars are very similar and more silver than typical British absinthium material and probably derive from southern Europe. "Lambrook Silver" is the earliest of these cultivars, having been selected in the late 1950s by Margery Fish, who developed the garden at East Lambrook Manor. "Lambrook Mist" was selected about 30 years later by Andrew Norton, a subsequent owner of the garden. Both gained their Awards of Garden Merit during the RHS Artemisia Trial 1991–3.

Cultivar "Silver Ghost" is a taller, silver plant, which flowers much later (August–September) than typical absinthium (June–July) in Britain, and so holds its silver appearance for longer. This and a more feathery-leaved cultivar "Persian Lace" were selected by National Collection Holder John Twibell in the 1990s.

== Constituents ==
Wormwood herb contains bitter substances from the group of sesquiterpene lactones; absinthin, at 0.20 to 0.28%, is the main component of these bitter substances. Essential oils make up 0.2 to 0.8% and contain (-) - thujone, (+) - isothujone, thujyl alcohol and its esters, chamazulene and other mono- and sesquiterpenes. In Bailen et al 2013 and Gonzalez-Coloma et al 2013 the Gonzalez-Coloma group discovered a chemotype that does not produce β-thujone but does contain terpenoids not seen elsewhere.

== Uses ==
Artemisia absinthium is claimed to have antifungal, neuroprotective, insecticidal, antimicrobial, anthelmintic, acaricidal, antimalarial, antidepressant, and hepatoprotective properties.

It is an ingredient in the spirit absinthe, and is used for flavouring in some other spirits and wines, including bitters, bäsk, vermouth, and pelinkovac. As a folk medicine, it is claimed to counteract poor appetite and to treat various diseases such as Crohn's disease and IgA nephropathy.

Wormwood was traditionally relatively common as a bittering spice in farmhouse brewing in Denmark, and to some extent Estonia. In 18th-century England, wormwood was sometimes used instead of hops in beer. According to Nicholas Culpeper, a stinking breath can be cured by "drinking a glass of Wormwood beer every morning".

Historical sources describe the use of Artemisia absinthium as an anthelmintic and antiprotozoal remedy, with modern studies reporting antibacterial, antifungal, and antibiofilm activity of its extracts. Wormwood-based alcoholic preparations, including absinthe, were also prescribed as prophylaxis during the 19th-century French conquest of Algeria.

Wormwood clippings and cuttings are added to chicken nesting boxes to repel lice, mites, and fleas. Bailen et al. 2013 and Gonzalez-Coloma et al. 2013 find the unique terpenoids of the Gonzalez-Coloma chemotype make this strain especially promising for insect control. As of 2020 a company named EcoflorAgro is investing heavily into increasing the planted area of this strain, hoping to commercialize it to a degree attempted – but never achieved due to unreliable supply – for other botanical insecticides before.

== Toxicity ==
Most chemotypes of A. absinthium contain (−)-α- and/or (+)-β-thujone, though some do not. (−)-α-Thujone by itself is a GABA_{A} receptor antagonist that can cause convulsions when administered in large amounts to animals and humans. However, there is only one case of documented toxicity of wormwood, in which a 31-year-old man drank 10 mL of steam-distilled pure volatile oil of wormwood, wrongly believing it was absinthe liqueur. Medicinal extracts of wormwood have not been shown to cause seizures or other adverse effects at usual doses. Thujones have not been shown to be the cause of excessive doses' toxicity for any kind of wormwood extracts, including absinthe.

== Cultural history ==
In the apocalyptic Book of Revelation ending the Bible, the star named "Wormwood" falls to earth and turns a third of its waters bitter. Similarly where the Biblical Hebrew word לענה (la'anah) appears in the Hebrew Bible, it is generally translated into English as "wormwood". The word occurs nine times in the Hebrew Bible, seven times with the implication of bitterness and twice as a proper noun, in the Greek translation apsinthos, naming the physical meteor in its orbit, in Revelation 8:11. The English rendering "wormwood" additionally refers to the dark green oil produced by the plant, which was used to kill intestinal worms.

The Chernobyl Nuclear Power Plant in Ukraine, notable for its catastrophic nuclear disaster in 1986, is named from one of the Ukrainian names for common wormwood: чорнобиль, chornóbyl' (or more commonly полин звичайний polýn zvycháynyy, 'common artemisia'). The name is inherited from Proto-Slavic *čьrnobylъ or *čьrnobyl, a compound of *čьrnъ, 'black' + *bylь, 'grass', the parts related to Ukrainian: чорний, romanized: chórnyy, lit. 'black' and било byló, 'stalk', which may also refer to A. vulgaris.

Lucretius, reflecting on life in the Roman Republic before 50 BCE, stated in his poem De rerum natura that, "Physicians, when they wish to treat children with a nasty dose of wormwood, first smear the rim of the cup with a sweet coat of yellow honey. The children, too young as yet for foresight, are lured by the sweetness at their lips into swallowing the bitter draught. So they are tricked but not trapped, for the treatment resorts them to health."

Nicholas Culpeper insisted that wormwood was the key to understanding his 1651 book The English Physitian. Richard Mabey describes Culpeper's entry on this bitter-tasting plant as "stream-of-consciousness" and "unlike anything else in the herbal", and states that it reads "like the ramblings of a drunk". Culpeper biographer Benjamin Woolley suggests the piece may be an allegory about bitterness, as Culpeper had spent his life fighting the Establishment, and had been imprisoned and seriously wounded in battle as a result.

William Shakespeare referred to wormwood in Romeo and Juliet: Act 1, Scene 3. Juliet's childhood nurse said, "For I had then laid wormwood to my dug" meaning that the nurse had weaned Juliet, then aged three, by using the bitter taste of wormwood on her nipple. He also referred to wormwood in Hamlet: Act 3, Scene 2. Hamlet said, "That's wormwood" in response to the Player Queen expressing distaste for remarriage.

John Locke, in his 1689 book titled An Essay Concerning Human Understanding, used wormwood as an example of bitterness, writing, "For a child knows as certainly before it can speak the difference between the ideas of sweet and bitter (i.e. that sweet is not bitter), as it knows afterwards (when it comes to speak) that wormwood and sugarplums are not the same thing."

Edwin Arlington Robinson relates in a poem how Cliff Klingenhagen gave a guest a glass of wine while drinking a glass of wormwood himself. He concludes, "I have spent / Long time a-wondering when I shall be / As happy as Cliff Klingenhagen is."
