= Thierry Jacquillat =

French businessman (1938-2010)

- Born: 29 July 1938; Versailles, France
- Died: 11 January 2010 (aged 71); Anzère, Switzerland
- Citizenship: French
- Education: École des hautes études commerciales de Paris (HEC)
- Occupations: CEO, Pernod Ricard, 1977-2000
- Known for: The expansion of Pernod Ricard, services to the economy
- Notable work: 'Fais Vite, Ne Traîne Pas En Route', 2005
- Movement: Globalisation
- Children: 4

Thierry Jacquillat (2 July 1938 in Versailles, France - 11 January 2010 in Anzère, Switzerland) was a French businessman who dedicated most of his career to the global wine and spirits group Pernod Ricard.

== Biography ==
He graduated from the École des Hautes Etudes Commerciales in Paris, after having studied at Cours Hattemer and Lycée Carnot.

=== Pernod Ricard ===
At the age of 25, he was taken on board the family-run Pernod Fils through Jean Hémard, who at the time was President of the brand. Jacquillat started out as a management assistant, then becoming administrative director and finally secretary general. Placed in charge of the merger with the Ricard group in 1974, he contributed to the creation of Pernod Ricard consequent to which he became 'Directeur General' (CEO) from 1977 to 2000, then Director and Vice President until 2004.

Jacquillat helped transform a French family-run business with 1,100 employees into one of the top world leaders in wines and spirits, with nearly 15,000 employees and a presence in nearly 100 countries. At the time of his departure in 2004, he had additionally seen the company grow by over 5 billion euros in market capitalisation, and become the second wine and spirits company globally with the acquisition of Allied Domecq and brands such as Mumm, Perrier-Jouët, Ballantine's, Malibu and Beefeater.

=== Nonprofits ===
In April 2002, Jacquillat was elected Chairman of the Greater Paris Investment Agency (also known as the Paris-île de France Capital Economique), a non-profit organisation dedicated to attracting investors to the Île-de-France region, working directly with the likes of Christine Lagarde. He also acted as the Vice President of the Paris Chamber of Commerce and Industry until December 2004, being in charge of relations with large companies. Returning to his holiday home in Anzère, Switzerland, in 2008, Jacquillat founded and presided the Festival des Musique des Montagnes du Monde (MMM Festival). This festival aimed to unite music from different cultures and traditions, bringing light to the underlying wealth of cultural differences around music originating from mountains around the world.

=== Death ===
Thierry Jacquillat died, aged 71, on 11 January 2010.

== Personal life ==
Jacquillat married Marie-Annick Waldruche de Montrémy in 1963, with which he had four children.

In 2005, after retiring, Jacquillat published a book called Fais vite, ne traîne pas en route, an autobiography recounting his adventures within the Pernod Ricard Group in great detail: it shows how Jacquillat managed to globalise the company in a span of forty years.

An aficionado of the arts, Thierry Jacquillat became president of the prestigious Ecole Normale de Musique de Paris-Alfred Cortot following the passing of his predecessor. He was made a Commandeur de la Légion d’honneur, an Officier of l’Ordre des Arts et des Lettres and has a Military Cross as officer in the French navy.

== See also ==
- List of wine personalities
- Pernod Ricard
- Pernod Ricard Winemakers
- Havana Club
- Orangina
- Clan Campbell
- Coca-Cola
- Patrick Ricard
- Jean-Claude Beton
