= Walter Becher =

German Bohemian politician (1912-2005)

Bundestag member

Personal details
- Born: 1 October 1912 Karlsbad, Bohemia, Austro-Hungarian Empire
- Died: 25 August 2005 (aged 92) Pullach, Bavaria, Germany
- Party: All-German Bloc/League of Expellees and Deprived of Rights (GB/BHE)
- Profession: Journalist

Walter Becher (1 October 1912 – 25 August 2005) was a German Bohemian politician, representative of the All-German Bloc/League of Expellees and Deprived of Rights (GB/BHE), All German Party (German: Gesamtdeutsche Partei) (GDP) and the Christian Social Union of Bavaria.

He was an associate of the pro-Nazi politician Konrad Henlein. Later, he became a writer for the Nazi newspaper "Die Zeit" published in Sudetenland.

== Early life ==
Becher was born on 1 October 1912 in Karlsbad, Bohemia, Austro-Hungarian Empire. He came from a Karlsbad manufacturing family, which was established there by 1530. The family's most popular product was the "Karlsbader Becherbitter" (English: Karlsbad Bitters), which today is sold under the name "Becherovka" produced by Jan Becher.

After leaving school Becher studied political science and then worked as a journalist. While a student, he joined the Deutsche Gildenschaft student association. In 1938, he became the arts, science, and entertainment editor for the newspaper "Die Zeit" (English: The Time). Die Zeit was controlled by the Sudetenland NSDAP, precursor to the Nazi Party.

Starting in 1940 he fought as a soldier in the Second World War. In 1942, he also became the 2nd editor for the military "Panzer-Propagandazug PK 697" (English: Tank Propaganda Company 697) led by Kurt Joachim Fischer. Becher ended the war in an American run Prisoner-of-war camp.

== Post World War II ==
After his release from prison Becher was displaced from his home of Bohemia to Bavaria where he became active in a movement of exiled Bohemian Germans. In 1947, he participated in the founding of the "Gründung des Sudetendeutschen Rates" English: Sudeten German Council). Between 1956 and 1958 he became the Chairman of the Witikobund, an association of Sudeten Germans.

Becher initiated the "Komitee zum Schutz der Bürger gegen Diffamierung durch die Linkspresse" a group committed to protect citizens against defamation by left-wing press in 1959. He also was vice chairman, until 1968, and then until 1982, chairman, of the Sudetendeutsche Landsmannschaft (English: Sudeten German Homeland Association).

Becher was awarded, in 1962, the Bavarian Order of Merit. In 1983, he was awarded the European Charlemagne Prize of the Sudeten German Association for outstanding services to self-determination and international understanding.

In 1969, East German film makers Walter Heynowski and Gerhard Scheumann shot a documentary about him called "Der Präsident im Exil" (German: The president in exile).

His son Peter Becher is chairman of the Adalbert Stifter -Vereins.

== Political parties ==
Becher was initially a member of the national "Kameradschaftsbund, Bund für gesamtgesellschaftliche Bildung" (English: Federation for societal education) which followed the teachings of Othmar Spann. In 1931, he became a member of the Sudeten German Party (SdP) of Konrad Henlein. After annexation of Sudetenland by Germany he was accepted into the Nazi Party.

After the Second World War he took part in the founding of the Deutsche Gemeinschaft party (DG). Shortly before the parliamentary elections in 1954 he switched parties to the BHE. In 1959 he tried, with the National Democratic Union (NDU), to establish a collective conservative movement but only the BHE, the Witikobund and some smaller organizations participated.

With the merger of the BHE with the German party in 1961 he became a member of the All-German party. In the 1962 parliamentary election in Bavaria he lost. Negotiations with the Free Democratic Party (FDP) for a cross-over to their party failed. In 1967 he joined the Christian Social Union of Bavaria (CSU).

== Bundestag ==
In the state elections of 1950 Becher with the League of Expellees and Deprived of Rights (German: Liste Deutscher Gemeinschaftsblock der Heimatvertriebenen und Entrechteten), a coalition of DG (6 seats) and BHE (20 seats) in the Bavarian state parliament and elected first deputy chairman of the DG coalition. From 1954 until his retirement from parliament in 1962 he was Chairman of the GB / BHE Group.

Because of the coalitions of the GDP for the general election in 1965 with the CDU, CSU and SPD Becher was on the CSU list in the German Bundestag, where he served until 1980. In the Bundestag he was a strict opponent of the Social-Liberal coalition.

== Literature ==
- Richard Stöss: Deutsche Gemeinschaft, Fußnote 21, in: derselbe Parteienhandbuch, Westdeutscher Verlag, Dormagen 1986, Seite 887.
- "Mandat und Dynamit". Der Spiegel. No. 44/1964. October 28, 1964.

== See also ==
- List of Bavarian Christian Social Union politicians
