= Jean-Claude Beton =

Algerian-born French businessman (1925–2013)

- Born: January 14, 1925; Boufarik, French Algeria
- Died: December 2, 2013 (aged 88); Marseille, France
- Occupations: Businessman, entrepreneur, agricultural engineer
- Known for: Orangina

Jean-Claude Beton (January 14, 1925 – December 2, 2013) was a French businessman and entrepreneur. He was a key figure in the rise of the French soft drink maker Orangina, being credited with transforming the drink from a little-known citrus soda first manufactured by his father, Léon Beton, into a major global brand. Beton launched Orangina's iconic, signature 8-ounce bottle in 1951, which became a symbol of the brand. The bottle is shaped like an orange, with a glass texture designed to mimic the fruit. In 2009, Beton called Orangina the "champagne of soft drinks", saying that "It doesn't contain added colorants. It was and still is slightly sparkling. It had a little bulby bottle."

== Biography ==
=== Early life and origins of Orangina ===
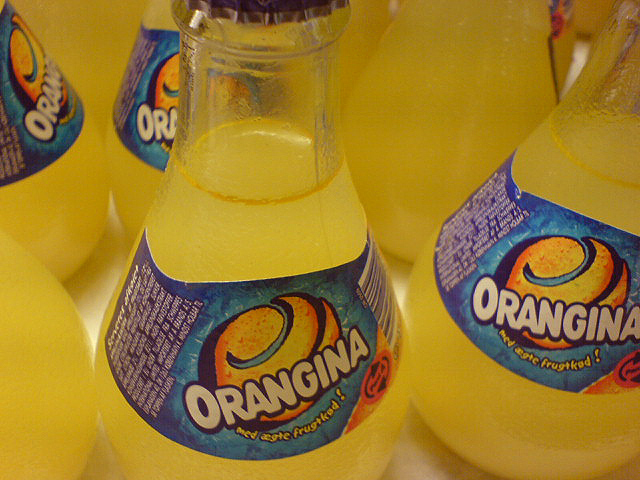
Orangina bottles, which Beton introduced in 1951.

Beton was born in Boufarik, French Algeria, on January 14, 1925. In 1935, his father, Léon Beton, a pied-noir shopkeeper, acquired the recipe for citrus concentrate, then called Naranjina (that would become Orangina), from its inventor, Spanish pharmacist Agustín Trigo. The original recipe contained a mix of citrus juices and sugar. Léon Beton tinkered with Trigo's formula, adding sparkling water and new essential flavoring oils. Léon also renamed the new drink from Naranjina to Orangina. The outbreak of World War II largely sidelined Léon Beton's attempts to market his drink in Europe.

=== Orangina ===
Jean-Claude Beton took over the company from his father in 1947. However, Beton did not relaunch Orangina until January 23, 1951, which happened to be his wife, Madeleine's, birthday. On that date, Beton began producing Orangina using orange from the surrounding groves in his native Boufarik. Jean-Claude Beton largely kept most of the original recipe, which he marketed to appeal in European and North African consumers. He opened a family-owned factory, which was located in Boufarik on the Mitidja Plain.

Orangina quickly became a common beverage throughout French North Africa, including a loyal following among French soldiers during the Algerian War. He introduced the soda to metropolitan France later in 1951. In 1951, Beton introduced Orangina's signature 8-ounce bottle, which would become a symbol of the brand. The bottle is shaped like an orange, with a glass texture designed to mimic the fruit. Beton, who excelled in marketing, insisted that the design and shape of the bottle remain the same, even after some resistance from restaurants and retail stores, who argued that the bottles were difficult to stock on shelves. In a 2009 interview, Beton noted that he "got lots of complaints from café owners who could not fit the bottle in their fridges." Besides the obvious similarities to an orange, Beton also described the bottle as having "a waist like a wasp and the bottom of a princess." He also refused to change Orangina's formula, which includes citrus pulp, despite appeals from shop owners. Beton later used television commercials to instruct consumers to shake the bottle before drinking.

The early Orangina logo was designed to include an orange peel, since under French law, Orangina could not use a full orange in its logo since the beverage contained a low percentage of fruit juice. Beton hired illustrator Bernard Villemot, who had created Art Deco poster advertisements for such French companies as Perrier and Air France. Villemot created the image of an Orangina bottle topped with an orange peel in the shape of an umbrella or parasol. He utilized an orange color design against a blue background, which called to mind the Mediterranean Sea, to comply with the French standards, while still depicting parts of the citrus fruit. Villemot's and Beton's design quickly became associated with post-war French success. The image proved successful and Orangina sold 50 million bottles in 1957 alone.

Beton moved his family's Orangina factory from Boufarik to Marseille in 1962 in the aftermath of the Algerian War, shortly before the North African country's independence. He continued to market Orangina extensively after the company's relocation. In 1978, Orangina was launched in the United States under the brand name, Orelia, which was later changed back to Orangina. In 1986, after he sold the company, a 75-foot sculpture of an Orangina bottle was installed outside Porte Maillot metro station in Paris to mark the drink's fiftieth anniversary.

=== Later life ===
Beton sold Orangina to Pernod Ricard in 1984, with Thierry Jacquillat of Pernod Ricard being a prominent character in regards to the purchase happening. He remained chairman of Orangina until his retirement in 1989. The brand went through a series of different owners throughout the 1980s and 1990s. In 1997, The Coca-Cola Company offered 5 billion francs for Orangina, but the acquisition was nixed by the French government, which cited the potential for unfair competition within the country's beverage market. A second attempt by Coca-Cola to purchase Orangina in 1998 also failed. Orangina, known officially as Orangina Schweppes, is now owned as a division of Suntory, as of 2014.

Orangina was not produced again in Algeria until 2003, when a new factory was opened by a franchise. Beton returned to Algeria for the first time since 1967 to attend the opening. He also visited the site of his original factory in Boufarik.

Beton pursued other interests after the 1984 sale of Orangina, including olive oil and wine. He purchased several olive groves, as well as the Château Grand Ormeaux winery in Bordeaux during the 1980s.

Beton died in Marseille on December 2, 2013, at the age of 88. His death was disclosed by the mayor of Marseille, Jean-Claude Gaudin. He was survived by his wife, Madelaine, and their two children, Eric and Françoise.
