= Patrick Ricard =

Patrick Ricard may refer to:

- Patrick Ricard (American football) (born 1994), American football player
- Patrick Ricard (entrepreneur) (1945–2012), French entrepreneur
