= Lycée Carnot =

School in Paris

Coordinates: 48°53′02″N 2°18′27″E

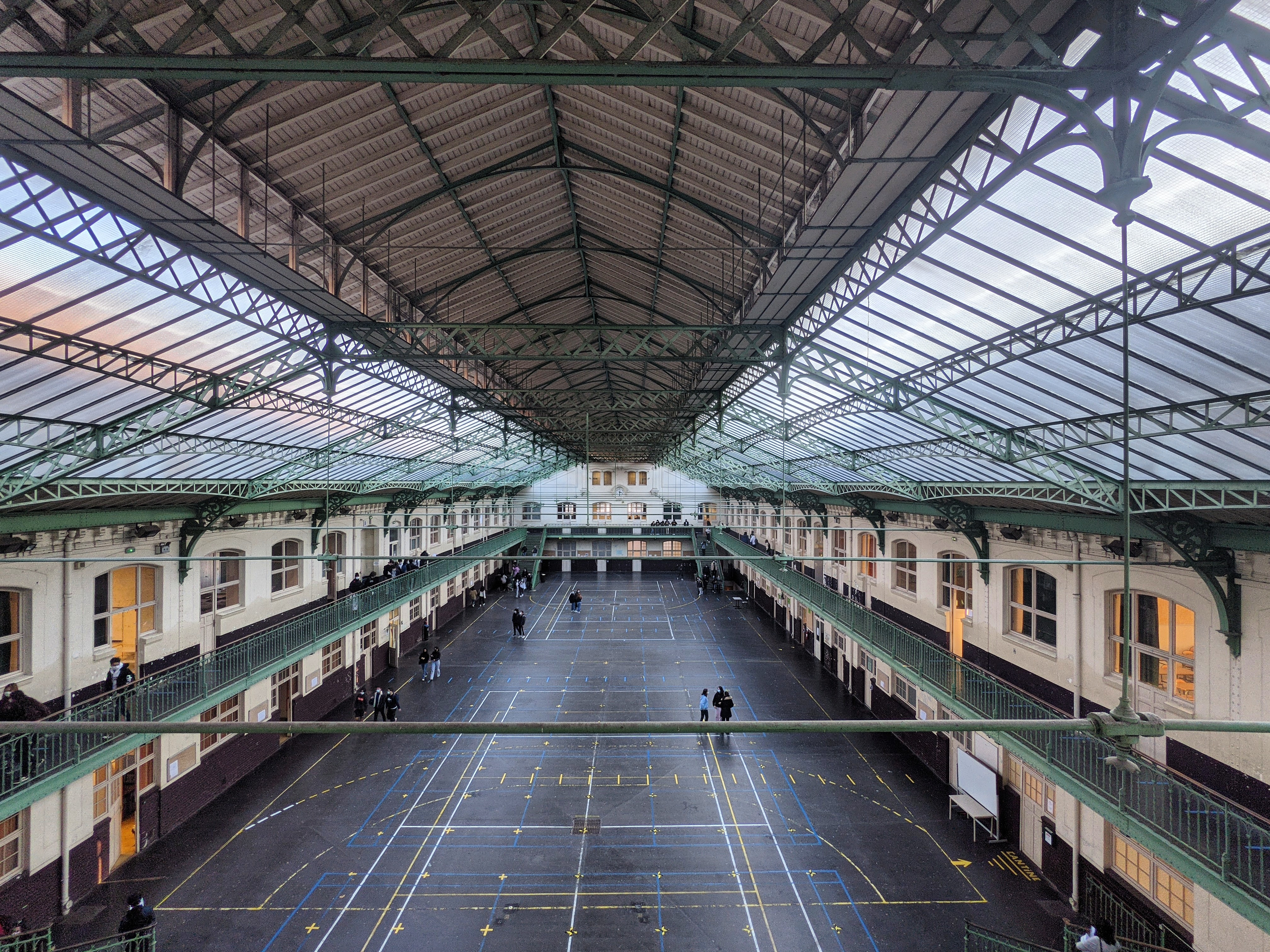
The Hall Eiffel

The Lycée Carnot (English: /kɑːrˈnoʊ/ kar-NOH, French: [lise kaʁno]) is a public secondary and higher education school at 145 Boulevard Malesherbes in the 17th arrondissement, Paris, France. The Lycée Carnot was founded in 1869, first bearing the name of École Monge and then renamed in 1895. Some of its former students have been among the most-influential personalities in the country, including Jacques Chirac, the former French President, and Pascal Lamy, the former president of the World Trade Organization (2005–2013), and continental philosopher Gilles Deleuze. The Orthodox theologian Fr. Alexander Schmemann attended the school. Daft Punk musicians Thomas Bangalter and Guy-Manuel de Homem-Christo met there in 1987. The poet Louis Aragon also attended Carnot.

The Lycée has served as a filming location for many films, and often hosts fashion shows during Paris fashion week. The heart of the building is a large hall measuring 80 by 30 meters covered with a glass roof mounted on a metal frame on a project by Gustave Eiffel. The Lycée Carnot has a middle school section and a high school section. There are also preparatory classes for grandes écoles, in economic and commercial sections as well as in sciences.

== Notable alumni ==
- Thomas Bangalter and Guy-Manuel de Homem-Christo, musicians and members of Daft Punk. The two met at the lycée.
- Maurice Bloch, anthropologist
- Stéphane Bourgoin
- Bernard Buffet, French painter of Expressionism and a member of the anti-abstract art group
- Jacques Chirac, former President of France
- Maurice Couve de Murville, former French Minister of Foreign Affairs and Prime Minister under the presidency of General de Gaulle
- Guy Debord, Situationist, author of The Society of the Spectacle and activist in the May 1968 events in France
- Gilles Deleuze, French philosopher in the post-structural tradition, friend and colleague of Michel Foucault
- Serge Haroche, French physicist, Nobel laureate
- Thierry Jacquillat, former president of Paris-île de France Capital Economique and former vice president and Director of Pernod Ricard
- Dimitri Kitsikis, Geopolitician, Fellow, Royal Society of Canada, Honorary President, The Dimitri Kitsikis Public Foundation
- Pascal Lamy, president of the World Trade Organization from 2005 to 2013
- Henri Laborit, surgeon, neurobiologist, writer and philosopher
- Guy Môquet, French Communist militant
- Jean Reno, French and Spanish actor who appeared in films such as Crimson Rivers, Godzilla, The Da Vinci Code, Mission: Impossible, The Pink Panther, Ronin, Wasabi, The Big Blue, Hector and the Search for Happiness and Léon: The Professional
- Joseph Rovan, French philosopher and politician
- Dominique Strauss-Kahn, former French finance minister and former (2007–2011) former Managing Director of the International Monetary Fund
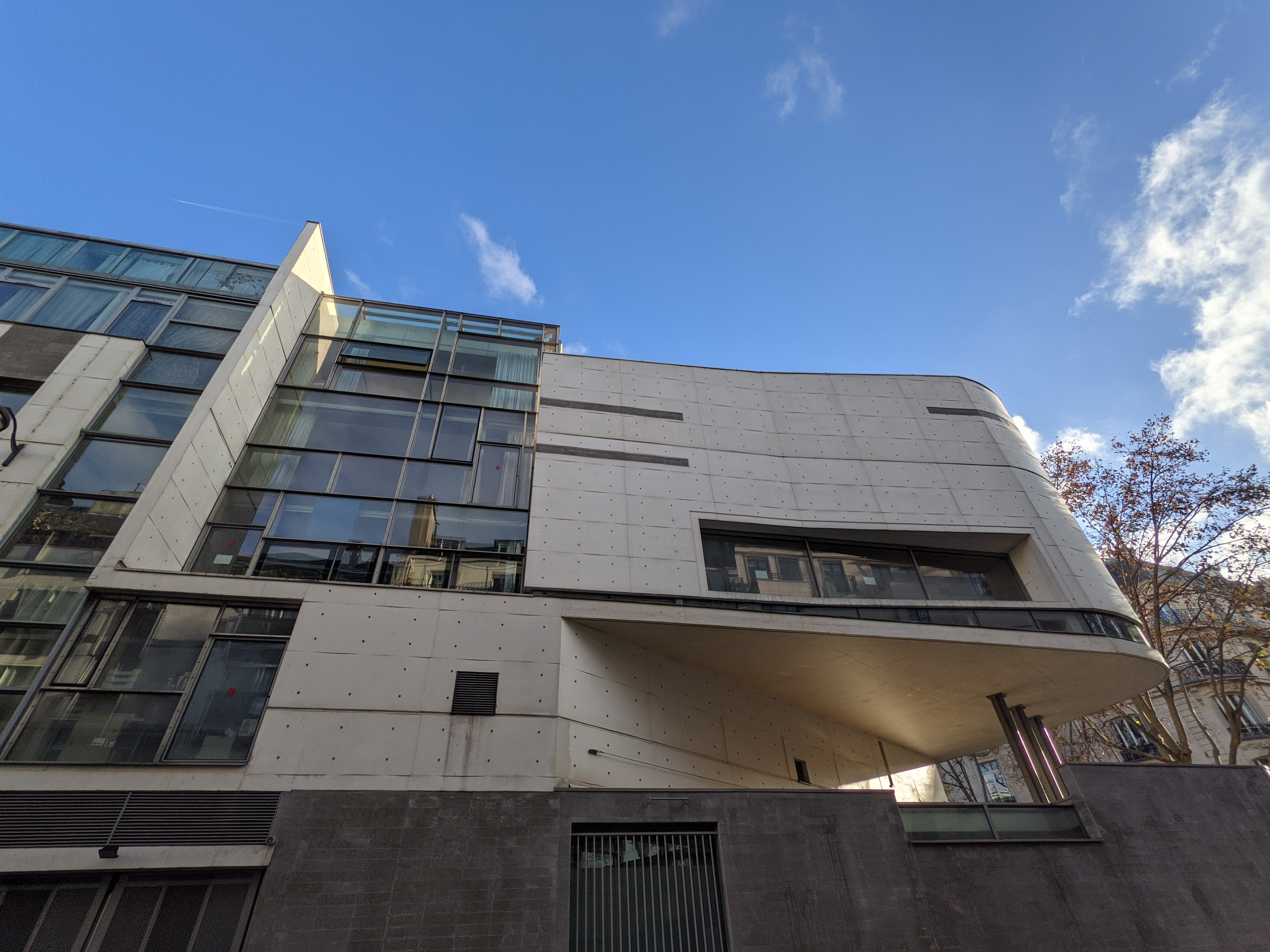
  The building where the Prepa study
- Tahar Zaouche, doctor and politician
