= Alexandre Ricard =

French businessman (born 1972)

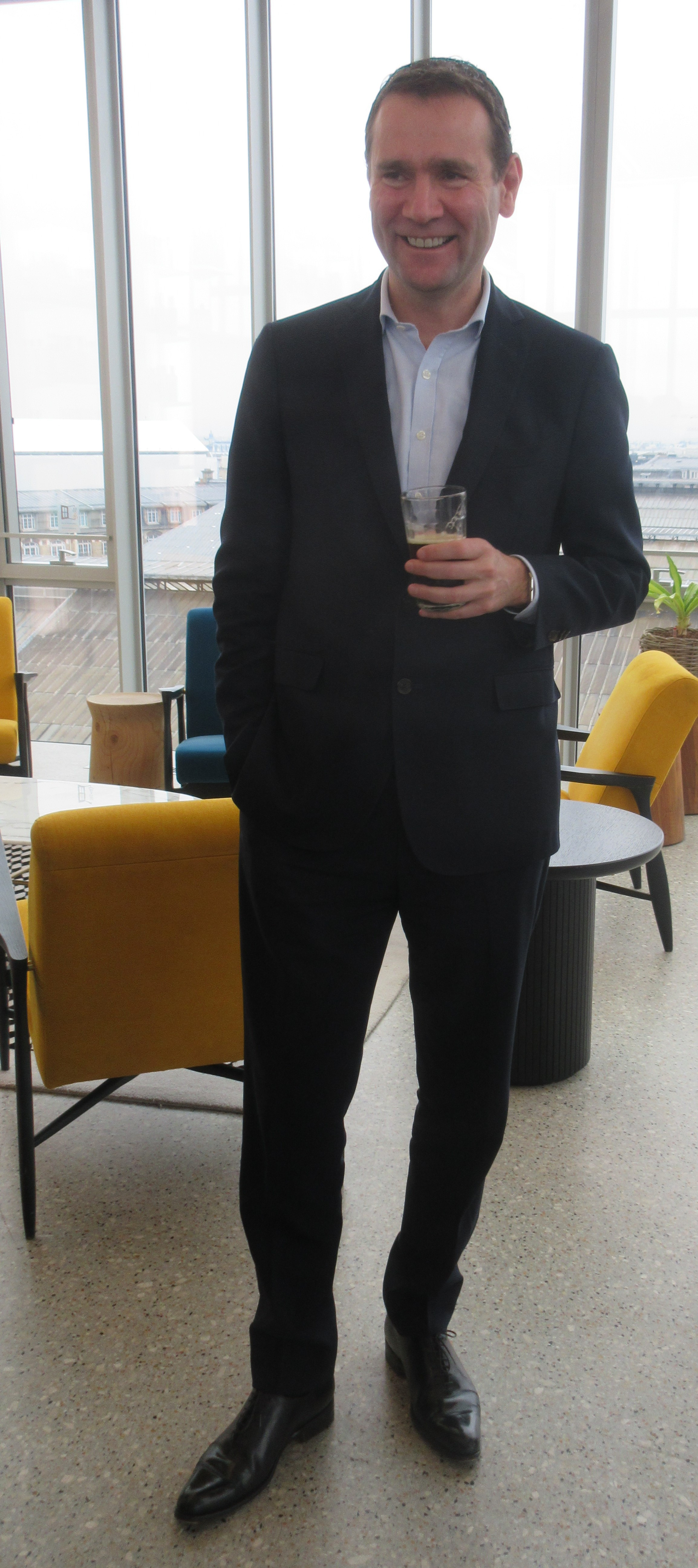
- Ricard in February 2023
- Born: 12 May 1972 (age 54); Boulogne-Billancourt, France
- Education: ESCP Europe; Wharton School
- Occupation: Businessman
- Title: Chairman & CEO of Pernod Ricard
- Children: 3
- Relatives: Paul Ricard (grandfather); Patrick Ricard (uncle)

Alexandre Ricard (born 12 May 1972) is a French businessman and one of the grandsons of distiller and Pernod Ricard founder, Paul Ricard. He became Chairman & Chief Executive Officer of Pernod Ricard, the world's second-biggest distiller by sales, on February 11, 2015. At 43, he was the youngest Chief Executive Officer of the 40 top companies on the CAC 40, the Paris Stock Market.

== Early life and education ==
Ricard was born on 12 May 1972 in Boulogne Billancourt, France, and grew up in Andorra. He graduated from ESCP Europe (Ecole Supérieure de Commerce de Paris) in 1995. He holds an MBA with a specialization in Finance and Entrepreneurship from the Wharton School of Business and a MA in International Studies from the University of Pennsylvania School of Arts and Sciences, which he obtained in 2001. He speaks French, English, Italian and Spanish.

== Career ==
Upon graduation in 1995, Ricard started his career outside the family business. After working at Banque Indosuez in Milan, he joined Accenture from 1997 to 1999, where he consulted on strategy. He then joined Morgan Stanley in London from 2001 to 2003, specializing in M&A. He has noted that these experiences have provided an outside perspective on the industry and Pernod Ricard.

In 2003, he joined his family's company in the audit department. His M&A skills were used during this period on the purchase of Allied Domecq by Pernod Ricard. In 2004, he was appointed Finance and Administration Director of the Pernod Ricard subsidiary Irish Distillers in Dublin. In September 2006, he became the managing director of Pernod Ricard Asia Duty Free, thus moving to Hong Kong. Two years later, he was asked to head up the Jameson Whiskey brand as CEO of Irish Distillers, an experience he always mentions enthusiastically. After going on to manage the Pernod Ricard distribution network, Ricard was appointed Chief Operating Officer and Deputy Chief Executive Officer of Pernod Ricard on August 29, 2012 shortly after his uncle and then-CEO Patrick Ricard suddenly died.

Following Patrick Ricard's death, the Group's Board named Alexandre Ricard as his successor upon the mandatory retirement of then-CEO Pierre Pringuet in February 2015. The succession announcement had been planned prior to Patrick Ricard's death, for the November 2012 shareholder meeting, but was moved up two months due to the circumstances. In the meantime, Ricard worked closely with Pringuet in all strategic matters for the Group. Alexandre Ricard's appointment as Chairman & CEO of the company took effect in February 2015.

== Other activities ==
- Brookings Institution, Member of the Board of Trustees
- L'Oréal, member of the board since 2021.

== Personal life ==
Ricard is married and has three children.
