= Paul Ricard (disambiguation) =

Paul Ricard (1909–1997) was a French industrialist.

Paul Ricard may also refer to:

- Circuit Paul Ricard, motorsports racetrack at Le Castellet, near Marseille, France
- Paul Ricard (trimaran), a speed record hydrofoiled trimaran

== See also ==
- Ricard (liqueur), the first brand of pastis
- Ricard, a surname
- Paul Richard (1667–1756), mayor of New York City
