= Claire Starozinski =

French animal welfare advocate

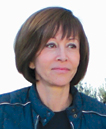
Claire Starozinski in 2008

Claire Starozinski is a French teacher, writer, and animal welfare advocate focusing on opposition to bullfighting. She is president of the Anti-Corrida Alliance, which she founded in 1994, and author of several books and pamphlets on bullfighting, including On est toujours le taureau de quelqu'un (2003) and La Face cachée des corridas (2006).

Michael Ogorzaly writes that Starozinski has taken part in several important legal battles in France to curtail bullfighting, including in July 2001 when the Alliance won a case in Toulouse that declared both that bullfighting was illegal, and that there was no continuous tradition of the practice there. The ruling was upheld in 2005 by the Supreme Court.

== See also ==
- Women and animal advocacy
