= Macieira Brandy =

Portuguese brandy

Macieira
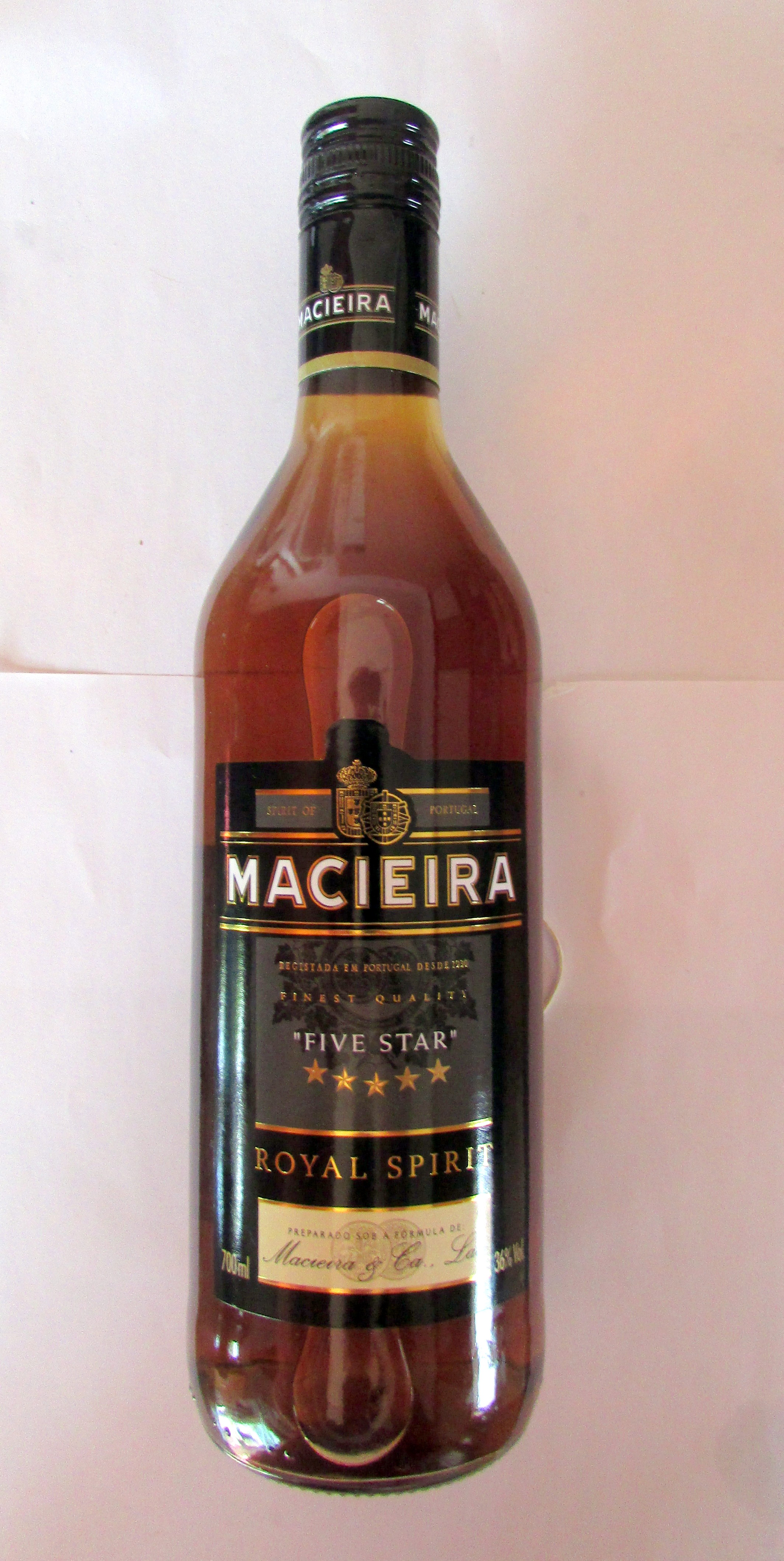
- Manufacturer: Pernod Ricard
- Origin: Bombarral, Portugal
- Introduced: 1885
- Website: macieira.importugal24.de/macieira_geschichte.php

Macieira is a Portuguese brandy created by José Guilherme Macieira after he studied winemaking in the French region of Cognac, famous for the production of this type of product. It is produced according to the secret recipe for more than 125 years. The success of Macieira was instant, its quality and reputation won over true connoisseurs in Portugal such as Fernando Pessoa the famous Portuguese poet, became loyal to the brand.

More than 125 years after its launch, it is the market leader in Portugal and is also exported to over 30 countries in 5 different continents.

== History ==
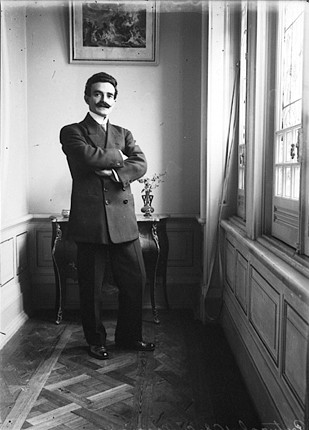
José Guilherme Macieira

In 1865, José Maria Macieira, father of the creator José Guilherme, founded Macieira & Cª Lda, with the purpose of selling olive oil, vinegars, wine and spirits. Twenty years later the company started its own brandy production, Macieira “Cognac”, as it was then known.

Macieira was exhibited at various Fairs, such as the Universal Exhibition of Paris in 1900, the South African Industrial Exhibition in 1904, the Commemorative Exhibition for the Inauguration of the Panama Canal in 1915 and many others.

Macieira was selected to replenish stocks of cognac destroyed during World War II.

In 1973 Macieira was acquired by Seagram, which in turn was acquired by Pernod Ricard in 2000.
