= Ricard (liqueur) =

French beverage

Ricard Pastis
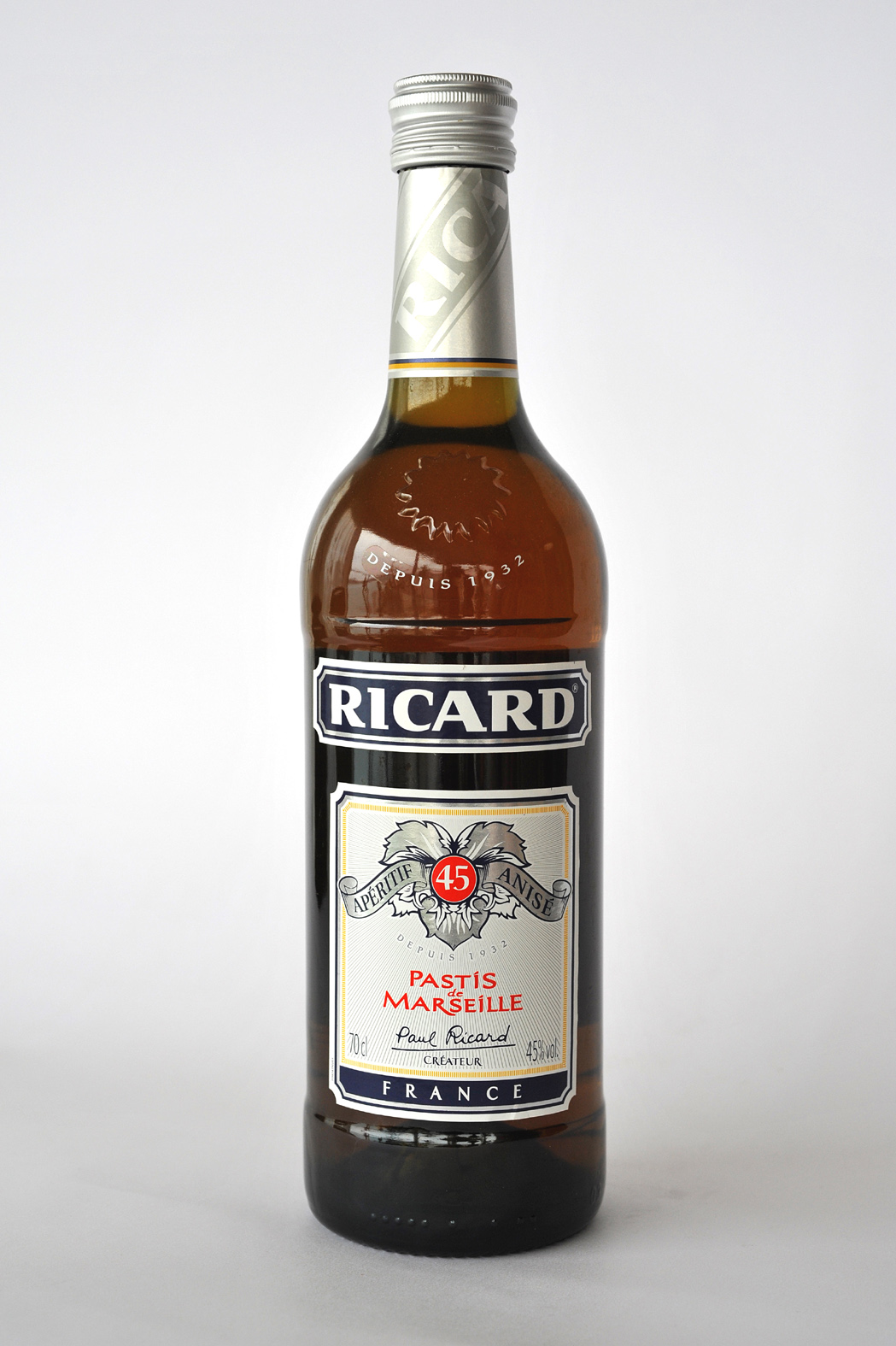
- A bottle of Ricard
- Type: pastis
- Manufacturer: Pernod Ricard
- Origin: France, Marseille
- Introduced: 1932; 94 years ago
- Alcohol by volume: 45%
- Proof (US): 90º
- Colour: Bright golden amber and bronze
- Flavour: Licorice and anise
- Ingredients: Liquorice root, anise, and star anise, and fennel seeds
- Website: pernod-ricard.com/en

Ricard (/rɪˈkɑːrd/; French pronunciation: [ʁikaʁ]) is a pastis, an anise and licorice-flavored apéritif, created by Marseille native Paul Ricard in 1932, who marketed it as the "true pastis from Marseille".

== History ==
=== Pre-1915: Absinthe decline ===
Aniseed-based liquors were popular in Southern Europe, i.e. ouzo and rakı in Mediterranean countries. Absinthe, an aniseed-based liquor largely produced by the Pernod Fils company, was the established "drink of choice" in France. However, absinthe had a high alcohol content and there were exaggerated fears that it was a dangerously addictive psychoactive drug and hallucinogen (side-effects thought to be caused by trace amounts of thujone). This prompted the French government in 1915 to enact legislation to ban all alcoholic drinks that were more than 16% alcohol, acting as a complete prohibition on aniseed-based drinks, due to their being suspected of undermining the French war effort. This prohibition was part of a global trend in that year, with prohibitions on absinthe being enacted in much of Europe, including France, the Netherlands, Belgium, Switzerland, and Austria-Hungary, and even in the United States, however, recent studies demonstrate that absinthe is no more dangerous than ordinary spirits.

=== 1915–1932: Creation of pastis ===
As a result of the 1915 absinthe ban, to substitute for this traditional aperitif, Marseille locals started mixing their own aniseed-based drink, made from a combination of star anis, water, liquorice and herbs. Paul Ricard was first introduced to home-made pastis, otherwise known as "the thing" or "tiger's milk", by an old shepherd. Ricard took the recipe for this "Marseille absinthe", and started experimenting and adapting it in his laboratory to produce a more refined version. In the late 1920s, in his laboratory, Paul Ricard concocted an aniseed-based drink modelled along the same lines as this pre-existing pastis, test-marketing his product illegally in Marseilles bars, as a result incurring some fines.

=== 1932–1940: Incorporation and production ===
In 1932, Paul Ricard started the Ricard company to produce and distribute the product, purportedly declaring, "It shall be called Ricard, the real pastis from Marseille!". By 1938, sales of Ricard already stood at 2.4 million litres.

=== 1940s: Prohibition ===
In 1940, the production of Ricard was stopped with the Vichy regime's enactment (23 August 1940) of the "Loi Contre L'Alcoolisme" ("Anti-Alcoholism Act") in France, which banned the manufacture and sale of aperitifs based upon alcohol distilled from anything other than grapes, followed by a subsequent enactment that completely banned such alcohol being advertised (September 1941). The product's illegality continued until 1944 when the production of pastis became legal again.

=== 1950–1960: Development and expansion ===
In 1951, 11 years after its interwar prohibition, once the production of pastis was authorized, the production of Ricard recommenced. In 1956, the delivery of the Ricard product on camelback, known as the "drink trailer", to avoid the fuel shortages created by the Suez Crisis, became part of the advertising of the Ricard product, such as the slogan "The Ricard Caravan vanquished thirst".

In the 1960s, Ricard opened factories all over France.

=== 1970s: Expansion ===
In 1975, the companies of Ricard and Pernod Fils, the two largest French aniseed aperitif producers and fierce competitors, merged creating the Pernod Ricard group, which now produces and distributes Ricard. The product range expanded exponentially and branches were established abroad.

1984 marked the year that the billionth bottle of Ricard was sold.

== Corporate entity ==
Ricard is a French public company that was founded in 1932 in Marseille by Paul Ricard to sell his Ricard drink. In 1962, the Ricard business was floated on the Paris Stock Exchange.

In 1968, Ricard retired from his daily running of the Ricard company, as a result of a fit of temper with state controls (said to be due to a combination of his famous bad-temper and his detestation of the power of the French state and bureaucracy). Paul Ricard's son, Patrick Ricard, inherited Ricard as the company's single product, sold almost entirely in France. Patrick Ricard led the drink and the company's international expansion, becoming managing director in 1972.

In 1975, the companies of Ricard and Pernod Fils, the two largest French aniseed aperitif producers and fierce competitors, merged creating the Pernod Ricard group, which currently owns the Ricard company. After the merger, in 1978, Patrick Ricard became the CEO of the Pernod Ricard group which he held until his death on 17 August 2012. Today Pernod-Ricard is the second-largest drinks business in the world, with only 10% of its sales in France and one of the widest product ranges in the industry, including table wines, champagnes, scotches, cognacs, gins, and vodkas.

Currently, the Ricard firm is still based in Marseille, however, the production of Ricard today takes place in Bessan, with the blending and bottling also taking place in Bordeaux and Lille. The Ricard Company has two main functions:

- Producing the Ricard, Pacific and Lillet brands in order to commercialize them in France and export them all over the world, through the Pernod Ricard's distribution subsidiaries.
- Commercializing some products from the Pernod Ricard group in France (Clan Campbell, Chivas Regal, Jameson, Absolut, Malibu, and Perrier Jouet).

== Branding ==
Paul Ricard, who had a degree in fine arts, designed his drink's first poster and label. The Ricard label featured an acanthus leaf, an ornamental leaf from the south of France, which has featured on every bottle and is now recognised as a distinctive mark of the brand and of pastis in general. The Ricard brand's blue and yellow design was inspired by the sky and the sun of his native Marseille. In more recent years a bright yellow sun logo was introduced to the bottle's neck.

== Production ==
An anethole essence is created by rectification of anise, star anise, and fennel seeds. Various herbs and liquorice root are steeped with a neutral alcohol The anethole essence and flavored alcohol are blended with sugar (less than 100 grams per litre), and caramel (giving the distinctive yellow colour). The resultant spirit is bottled and stored above 12 °C and away from sunlight, otherwise, the anethole starts to crystallise and impair its look and flavour.

Ricard is produced under the Pernod Ricard company's strategic growth plan based on sustainable development and social commitment, which is reflected in the production values of reducing water consumption for crops and production, reducing carbon emissions, and reducing wastes, therefore, the productions sites and vineyards for Ricard are usually certified in line with the United Nations' Sustainable Development Goals (ODD).

== Product sales ==
According to Nielsen, based on the checkouts of distributors (hypermarkets, supermarkets, drives, etc.) and the purchase declarations of Nielsen panelists, the one-litre bottle of Ricard received an annual turnover in France of 265 million euros in 2017 and 275 million euros in 2018, making it the most represented brand in distributor sales, outranking all other Pernod Ricard products sold in France, such as the six-pack (1.5-litre bottles) of Cristaline (Mineral Water) and the one-litre bottle of William Peel, which were also in the top four.

== Consumption ==
=== Consumption in France ===
Ricard is often considered the leading flavoured spirit in France. This century, Ricard has reported an annual consumption of their pastis in France ranging from 120 million litres to 130 million litres. The Ricard and Pastis 51 brands hold high market positions for the Pernod Ricard group, which produces and distributes them through the Ricard company. Ricard is often coined as the "first spirit brand" in France, based on the volumes sold and/or turnover.

=== Consumption globally ===
This century, more than 40 million litres to 48.6 million litres (5.4 million 9 litre cases) of Ricard are sold globally each year, making Ricard the world's eleventh-largest spirits signature.

== Serving ==
=== Traditional ===
In accordance with Paul Ricard's original recipe, which is the traditional way to serve Ricard, Ricard should be served cold, in a 1-to-5 dilution with chilled water, e.g. 20ml Ricard to 100ml water, after which ice cubes are added. The water is added before the ice cubes, due to the anethole's cold sensitivity This whole ritual was advocated by Paul Ricard in order to release the full aroma of the anise. Dilution of Ricard with water causes the spirit to louch (turn milky). In its diluted form, Ricard is known colloquially as the "Milk of Marseille".

=== Cocktails ===
A number of standard cocktails exist involving Ricard, some being variants of classic cocktails involving other aniseed-based liqueurs like absinthe:

| Cocktail name | Ingredients | Method |
|---|---|---|
| Bitter Cold | Ricard (2 ds), vodka (1 3/8 oz), Suze (bsp), herbal liqueur (1 ds), bitters - Bitter Truth Celery (3 dr), bitters - Bitter Truth Jerry Thomas's Own Decanter (1 rd), and Gomme syrup (2 dr) | The ingredients are shaken well with ice, and strained into a chilled glass (small tumbler or large shot glass). |
| Blushing Geisha | Ricard (¾ oz), Soju (1 oz), lychee liqueur - Soho (1½ oz), Campari (½ oz), and lemon bitters (ds). | The ingredients are stirred together with ice |
| Cul-De-Sac | Ricard (½ oz), and rum (2½ oz). | The ingredients are stirred together, in a mixing glass which is half-filled with ice cubes, and then strained into a cocktail glass. |
| Colony Room | Ricard (ds), gin (2 oz), Noilly Prat (2 ds), and bitters (1 ds). | Ricard is swilled to coat a cocktail glass, disaguarding the excess. The remaining ingredients are stirred together with ice, and strained into the prepared glass. |
| Dog Days | Ricard (5 parts), and limeade (2 parts) | The ingredients are mixed in a tumbler with ice. |
| Eastern Manhattan | Ricard (¼ oz), whisky (2½ oz), and sweet vermouth (½ oz) | The ingredients are stirred together with ice, and then strained into a cocktail glass. |
| Happy Families | Ricard (1/8 oz), gin (¾ oz), mead (¾ oz), bitters (1 ds), balsamic vinegar (1/8 oz), lime juice (1/8 oz), green tea (3 oz), and tonic water (¾ oz) | The ingredients, except tea and tonic, are shaken, then strained into a glass, after which the tea and tonic are added. |
| Mentaphor | Ricard (½ oz), gin (1 oz), Fernet (½ oz), Fernet-Branca (¼ oz), and Green Chartruese (1/4 oz) | The ingredients are built over a rock (progressively poured over ice). |
| Late Mistral | Ricard (¼ oz), vodka (1.5 oz), water (2 oz), and lemon (1 twist) | The ingredients are mixed and poured over ice cubes in an aperitif glass. A twist of lemon peel is then added. |
| Pearl of Puebla | Ricard (1 bsp), Mezcal (2 oz), Yellow Chartruese (¾ oz), lime juice (¾ oz), Agave syrup (1 bsp), and oregano (4 spg) | The oregano and agave nectar are muddled. All the ingredient are then shaken with ice, and then strained into a chilled coupe glass. |
| Ricard Tomate | Ricard (2 oz), Grenadine (¼ oz), and water (5 oz). | The Ricard and Grenadine are mixed, to which the water and then some ice are added. |
| Sazerac | Ricard (1 tsp) [Instead of Absinthe], caster sugar (½ tsp), bitters (2 ds), water (1 tsp), whisky (2 oz), and lemon (1 twist) | The Ricard is swirled in a glass to coat, discarding the excess. The sugar, bitters, and water and muddled in the glass with a teaspoon. The glass is filled with ice cubes, and bourbon is poured over the ice. A twist of lemon is added. |
| Shetty Classic | Ricard (1 oz), rum (1 oz), vodka (1 oz), and sugar. | The ingredients are added to a bowl full of sugar and set alight, after which they are poured cool into a cocktail glass. |
| T.L.C. | Ricard (1 tsp), whisky (1½ oz), d'orange liqueur (½ oz), red vermouth (1 tsp), and bitters (1 ds) | The ingredients are stirred together with ice, and strained into a cocktail glass, which is garnished with a lemon twist. |
| Tomate | Ricard (1½ oz), Grenadine (ds), and water (2 oz) | The Ricard is poured over ice in an aperitif glass, then the grenadine and water are stirred in. |
| Wilfred's Weather | Ricard (½ tsp), dry vermouth (1 oz), gin (¾ oz), and bitters (1 ds) | The ingredients are stirred together with ice, and then strained into a cocktail glass. |
