= Jan Becher =

Company in the Czech Republic

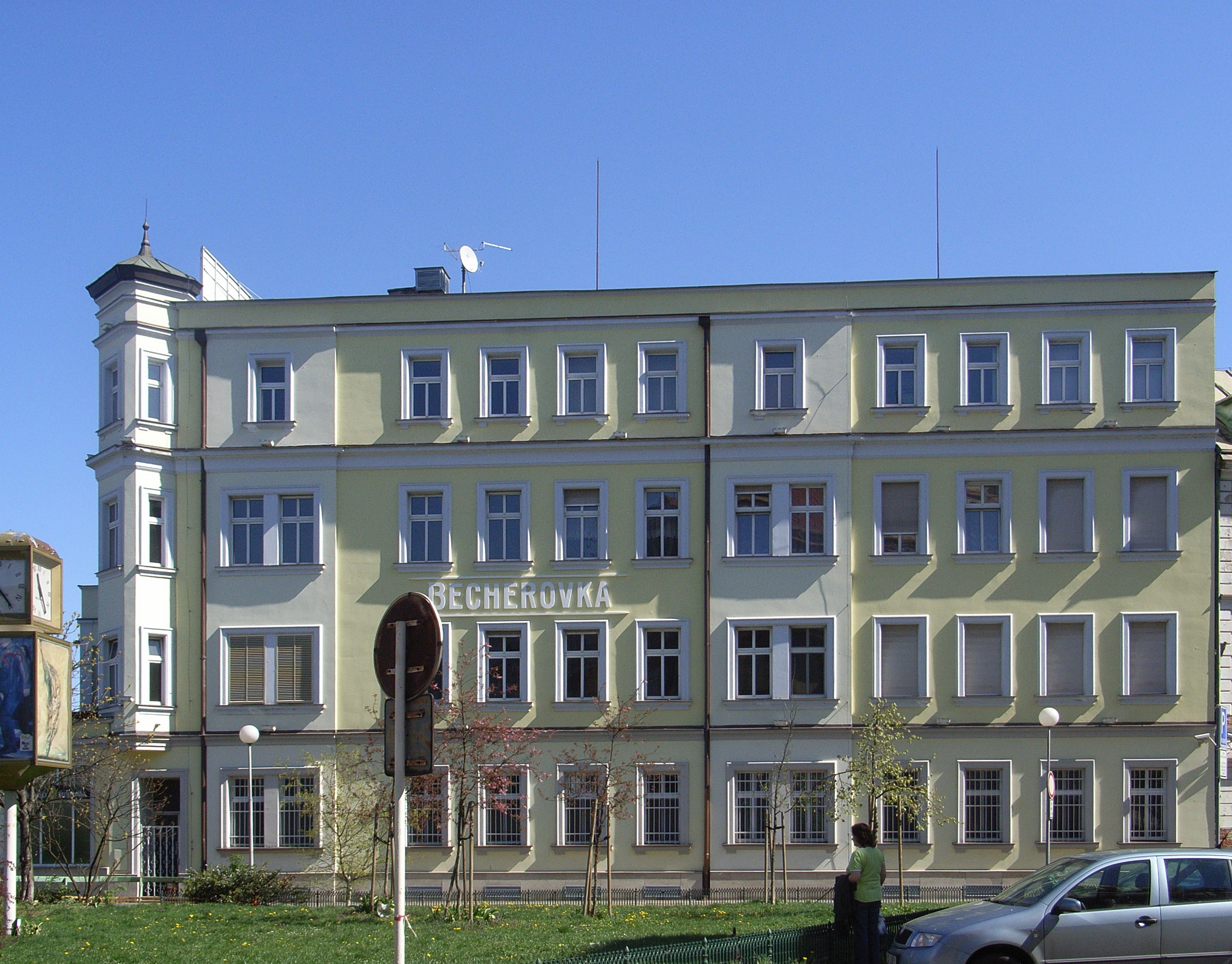
- Jan Becher headquarters in Karlovy Vary
- Company type: Subsidiary
- Industry: Alcohol
- Founded: 1807; 219 years ago
- Founder: Jan Becher
- Headquarters: Karlovy Vary, Czech Republic
- Area served: Worldwide
- Products: Alcoholic beverages
- Revenue: 1,207,322,000 Czech koruna (2024)
- Operating income: 202,971,000 Czech koruna (2024)
- Net income: 171,492,000 Czech koruna (2024)
- Total assets: 947,902,000 Czech koruna (2024)
- Owner: Pernod Ricard
- Number of employees: 113 (2024)
- Parent: Pernod Ricard
- Website: pernod-ricard.cz/

Jan Becher is a Czech liqueur company headquartered in Karlovy Vary. The most famous product of Becher is Becherovka.

== History ==
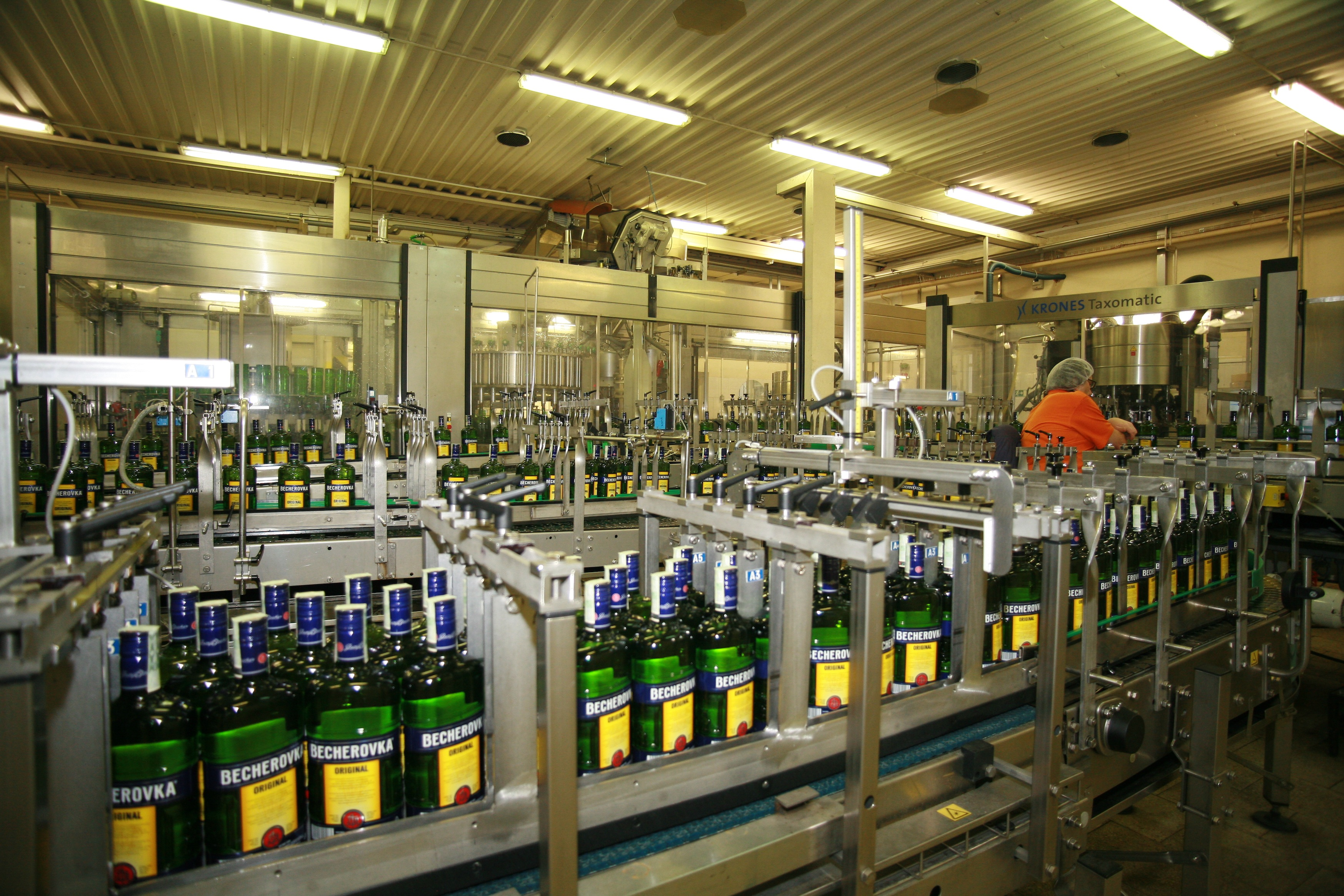
Inside Jan Becher factory

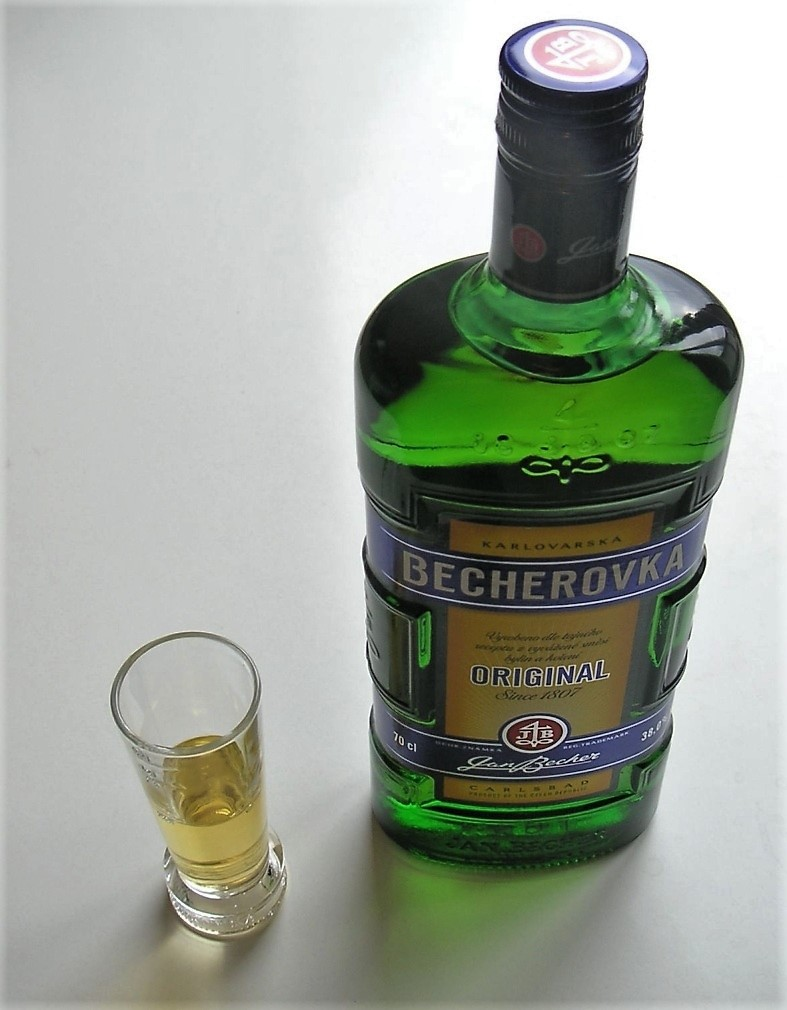
Becherovka is the most popular product of Jan Becher

The company Jan Becher - Karlovarská Becherovka, a.s., dates back 200 years to the first decade of the 19th century. In 1807, Josef Becher, a pharmacist from Karlovy Vary (then called Karlsbad), started selling bitters made to his own recipe as a medicinal tonic. In 1841, Josef Becher passed on his budding business to his son and heir Johann. Johann started large-scale production, and accordingly, his name has been associated with Becherovka to the present day. The drink was called Karlsbader Becherbitter. The name Becherovka was developed after World War I when Bohemia became part of Czechoslovakia, and the sole official language Czech.

Over the next hundred years (until 1945), the management of the company was passed down through the Becher family. After World War II, the company was nationalized under the Benes-Decrees that stripped local Germans and Magyars of property and citizenship. The Becherovka company was privatized in 1997 when the French liquor company Pernod Ricard bought 35% of the stock, acquiring another 59% in 2001.

The original owners of the company were not willing to accept this fate without struggle. After her father, Alfred Becher, died in 1940, and her brother and her husband drafted in the German army, where both died in World War II, the young Hedda Baier-Becher (1914-2007) managed the company. After the expulsion of her family from their native Bohemia, she lived in Cologne, Germany, and in 1949 recreated the company as the Johann Becher OHG Likörfabrik in 1949, with the German assets of her family's company, as Germany did not recognize the legality of the expropriation. In 1950, the company moved to Kettwig and in 1984 to Rheinberg. Though she had been forced in 1945 to divulge the secret recipe to the Czech police, she knew the recipe by heart as well, and together with a few workers from the old company, created a superior product sold as "Karlsbader Becher" with distinctive blue-yellow labels. In the 1970s, Emil Underberg, of the German manufacturer of bitters Underberg, bought the majority of the company.

For many years, the existence of two companies—the one run by the owners, the other by their expropriator—was not a large issue. The Czech firm sold in the Communist bloc, and the German company in Germany. In the early 1980s, though, competition increased, and in October 1985, Underberg and the Czech trade ministry made a contract. The German company would cease to make the liquor in exchange for becoming the sole distributor in Germany of the Czech-made product, but using its own bottles and not those used by the Czech company. When the Czech company ended the agreement in 1994, the Johann Becher OHG began manufacturing Karlsbader Becher again. The Czech firm sued for trademark infringement, but the Landgericht Düsseldorf clarified that Hedda Baier-Becher was, in Germany, the sole legal owner of her father's business, including the trademark Karlsbader Becher.

The conflict was resolved when Pernod Ricard bought the Johann Becher OHG in April 1999 and sold it to the firm Becherovka before acquiring Becherovka altogether in 2001.

== Products ==
Becherovka is the main product of Jan Becher and has been exported into 35 countries in 2008. Other products are Lemond, Limet, the liqueur Cordial, and the Aperitiv KV 14.
