= Ricard =

Ricard is a surname, as well as a Catalan name. Notable people with the surname include:

- Amable Ricard (1828–1876), French politician
- Étienne Pierre Sylvestre Ricard (1771–1843), French general under Napoleon
- Hámilton Ricard (born 1974), Colombian footballer
- Jean-François Ricard (born 1956), French prosecutor of the National Terrorism Prosecution Office
- Jean-Pierre Ricard (born 1944), Catholic cardinal, Archbishop of Bordeaux
- John Ricard (born 1940), U.S. Catholic bishop
- Matthieu Ricard (born 1946), Nepalese French Buddhist monk
- Patrick Ricard (American football) (born 1994), American football player
- Paul Ricard (1909–1997), French entrepreneur
- René Ricard (1946–2014), American poet, art critic, and painter
- Théogène Ricard (1909–2006), Canadian politician

== See also ==
- Ricart
- Ricard, a French distilled beverages company which merged with Pernod Fils to form Pernod Ricard
- Ricards Lodge High School, Comprehensive secondary school for girls in Wimbledon
- Paul Ricard (disambiguation)
- Ricardo (disambiguation)
- Richard (disambiguation)
