= Tahar Zaouche =

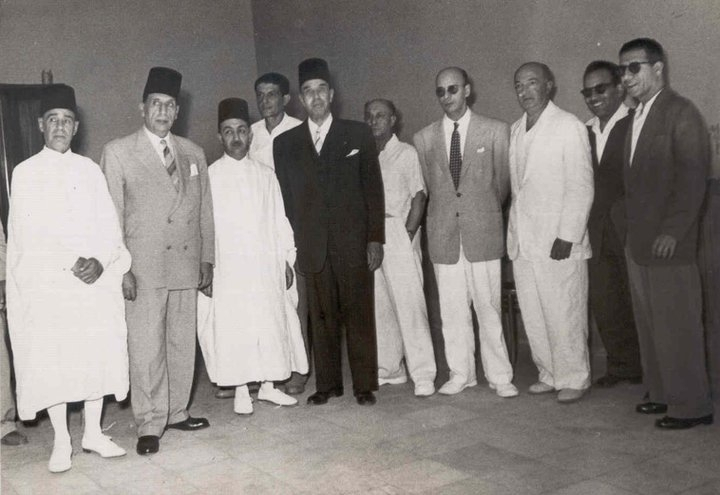
Tahar Ben Ammar'o office: Tahar Zaouche is the third from the right

Tahar Zaouche (6 September 1904 – 19 December 1975) was a Tunisian medical doctor and politician.

== Biography ==
Tahar Zaouche studied at Lycée Carnot. Like other members of the first-generation of Tunisian doctors, he enrolled in a French university to pursue medical studies. As a specialist in otorhinolaryngology, he presented his thesis, Contribution to the study about Plasmacytoma of the upper airways, in 1932 at the Faculty of Medicine of Paris.

He was a member of the Association of North African Muslim Students in the 1930s.

In 1932, he came back to Tunisia and got engaged in a political movement. In just three years, he became the secretary general of the third political office of the Neo-Destour. He was accompanied by his brother Noureddine, who was treasurer of the office.

As a doctor, he succeeded Mahmoud El Materi as head of council of the medical college. He became the second Tunisian president to serve in this mission between 1963 and 1971. He was assisted during this mandate by Tawhida Ben Sheikh, the first female doctor in Tunisia and the Arab world, as vice-president.

In the 1950s, Tahar Zaouche served as Minister of Health in Tahar Ben Ammar's office and as Minister of Public Works. Along with Tahar Ben Ammar, Mongi Slim (his brother-in-law) and Hedi Nouira, he played an important role in the Tunisian–French negotiations in September 1954. This delegation led to the signing of the agreements on internal autonomy in 1955.

== Family ==
Zaouche is the grandson of Tahar Zaouche, nephew of Abdeljelil Zaouche, cousin of Ahmed Zaouche and father of diplomat Hamid Zaouche.
