= Ricart =

Ricart is a surname. Notable people with the surname include:

- Glenn Ricart (born 1949), American computer scientist
  - Ricart–Agrawala algorithm
- Josep Gudiol Ricart (1904–1985), Catalan art historian
- Lea Ricart Martínez (born 2001), Andorran swimmer
- María Altagracia Ricart, wife of Alejandro Woss y Gil
- María Francisca Ricart Olmos (1881–1936), beatified Spanish nun
- Maruxa and Coralia Fandiño Ricart, Spanish sisters, popular figures in Santiago
- Miguel Ricart, convicted for the murder of the Alcàsser Girls
- Pau Gaspar Tonnesen Ricart (born 1992), Spanish decathlete
- Robert Ricart, author of The Maire of Bristowe is Kalendar
- Wifredo Ricart (1897–1974), Spanish engineer, designer and executive manager

== See also ==
- Ricard
