= West Coast Cooler =

Wine cooler

- Headquarters: Ireland
- Website: www.westcoastcooler.com

West Coast Cooler is a wine cooler made from white wine and fruit flavourings. It is owned and produced by Pernod Ricard's Irish subsidiary, Irish Distillers. It has an alcohol content of 3.5%.

== History and marketing ==
It was launched in Dublin on 21 August 1984 but was relaunched in 2004 with a new image. It is primary marketed at young to middle-aged women. The relaunch involved an advertising campaign showing three women getting ready for a night out in a manner that resembled a sitcom with the slogan "It's Showtime!". The drink has been involved in promotions such as the sponsorship of the Belfast premiere screening of the film Confessions of a Shopaholic and the West Coast Cooler FASHIONWEEK.

== Varieties ==
- This product is sold in 750 ml bottles or the 250 ml bottles in packs of 4 bottles from Off Licences, or can be purchased chilled in 250 ml bottles in pubs and nightclubs.
- On 6 July 2009, a new product was launched, "West Coast Cooler Rosé", which is made from rosé wine and berry and fruit flavourings.
- In May 2011 a new Citra variety was launched. The makers claim that Citra has a citrus taste.
- West Coast Cooler and Vodka was launched in 2014.

== Cocktails ==
- A Cooler Cup can be made by adding strawberries, a sliver of cucumber, fresh mint, a lime slice, a lemon slice, an orange slice and topping up with West Coast Cooler.
- A Constable Shuffle can be made using 2 shots of peach schnapps with one shot of Galliano, half a pint of cider and half a large bottle of West Coast Cooler.
- It can also be used as the base for any white wine spritzer.
- A CoolFast can be made by mixing 2 parts West Coast Cooler with 2 parts Buckfast.
- An LK - Traditionally a schooner glass with a nip of bourbon, a generous serving of west Coast Cooler and topped off with ice cold Coca-Cola.
