= Malfy Gin =

Gin brand

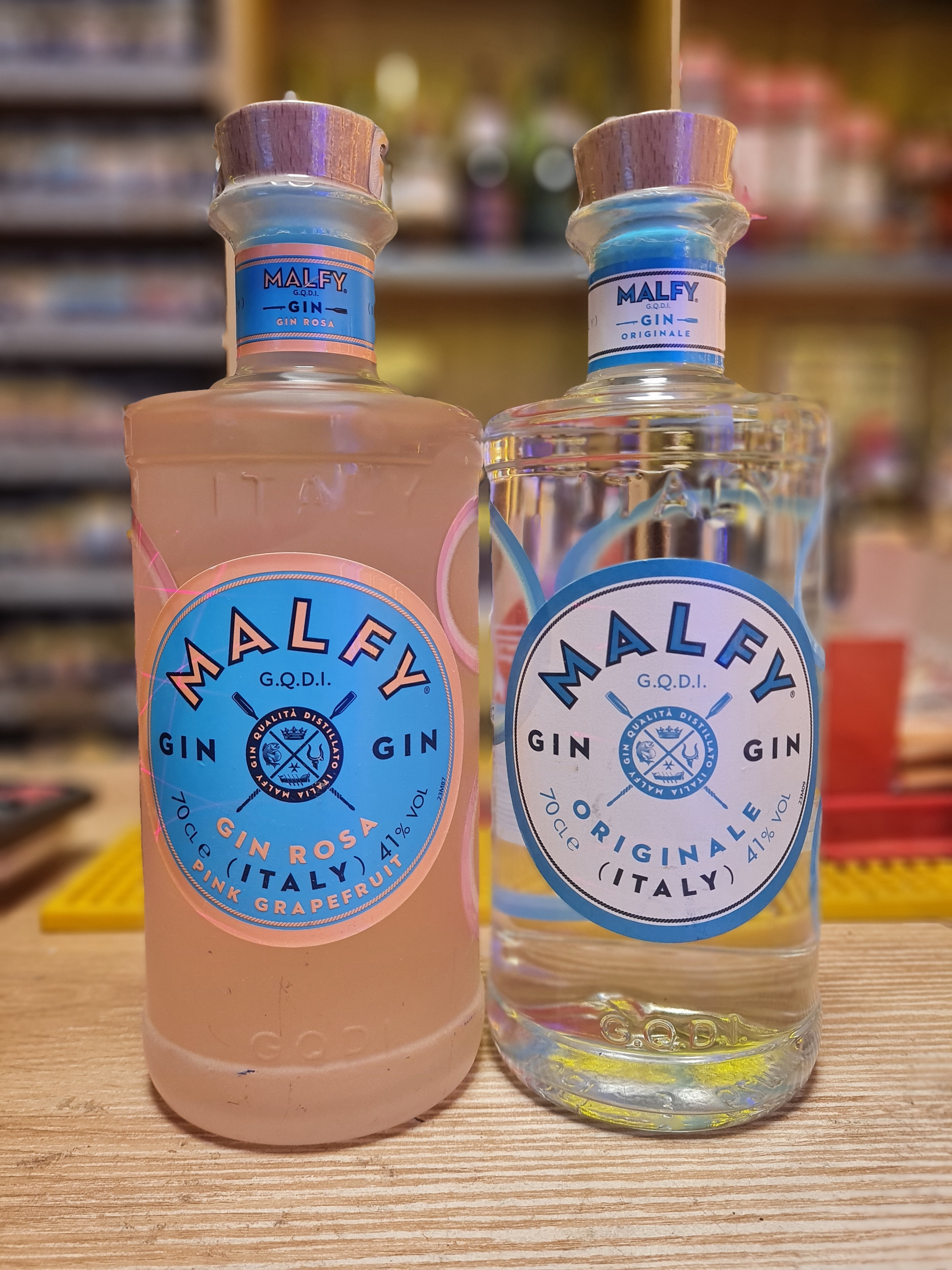
- Type: Gin
- Manufacturer: Torino Distillati
- Distributor: Pernod Ricard
- Origin: Italy
- Introduced: 2016
- Alcohol by volume: 41%
- Proof (US): 82
- Colour: Clear
- Flavour: Juniper, lemon
- Website: malfygin.com

Malfy Gin is a brand of gin bottled in Italy, distilled by Torino Distillati, and distributed by Pernod Ricard.

== History ==
The brand was acquired by Pernod Ricard in 2019. In 2015, Biggar & Leith was formed, to develop spirits from small, family-owned distilleries in Europe. The company approached the Vergnano family, which has been distilling gin since the 1970s at Torino Distillati in Moncalieri in the Piedmont region of Italy. Malfy Originale and Malfy Gin Con Limone were launched in the United States in March 2016, and are available in 40 countries as of October 2017. Distilled by the Vergnano family at their distillery, Malfy was the first Italian gin to be imported into the US. Gin is typically considered to have originated in Holland in the 17th century, but the company asserts that monks in Italy were distilling juniper-based medicinal spirits as far back as 1050.

== Description ==
For Malfy Gin Con Limone, a mix of Amalfi Coast and Sicilian lemon peels are steeped in alcohol made from Italian grain, and pressed in a traditional basket press. The extract is added to the mix of botanicals: juniper from Italian berries, coriander, cassia, licorice, grapefruit peel and orange peel, and distilled in a vacuum still at a low temperature. It is bottled at 41% abv. The taste has been compared to limoncello. The Chicago Tribune said it "features a bit of bitter lemon-rind character crossed with a dash of lurking sweetness," with the botanicals in the background.

Malfy Gin Originale combines Italian juniper and five botanicals with Italian winter wheat spirit and is bottled at 41% abv, using water from Monviso.
