= Patrick Ricard (entrepreneur) =

French entrepreneur and CEO

- Born: 12 May 1945; Marseille, France
- Died: 17 August 2012 (aged 67); Toulon, France
- Occupation: Businessman
- Awards: French-American Chamber of Commerce "Person of the Year 2003"; Commander of the Legion of Honour; Knight of the National Order of Merit

Patrick Ricard (12 May 1945 – 17 August 2012) was a French entrepreneur and chairman and CEO of the liquor and wine group Pernod Ricard.

After studying business in France, Germany and the United States, Patrick Ricard joined the Ricard company, founded by his father Paul Ricard in 1932. He held successive positions in the company's main departments, becoming managing director in 1972. With the creation of Pernod Ricard in 1975 he was appointed group managing director and then, in 1978, chairman and CEO.

He was the architect of the Group's ambitious strategy of growth through acquisition, aimed at broadening the product range and accelerating the development of the international business. The strategy proved a resounding success, particularly through the acquisitions of Seagram and Allied Domecq, sales outside France now accounting for 90% of turnover as against 17% when the Group was formed.

== Achievements ==
In 2003, Patrick Ricard was named "Person of the Year 2003" by the French-American Chamber of Commerce in New York City.

Ricard was awarded a number of French government honours, including a Commander of the Legion of Honour in 13 July 2007, and a Knight of the National Order of Merit.

== Personal life ==
Patrick Ricard was married with three children. His interests included hunting and opera.

He died suddenly on 17 August 2012 following a cardiac incident in Toulon.
