= Limet =

Czech herbal bitters

Limet is a herbal bitters made in Karlovy Vary in the Czech Republic, flavored with anise seeds, cinnamon, various herbs, and a rich citrus flavor according to a recipe of the Becher family. The drink was launched in 2000. It is normally served cold, and is often used as an aid to digestion. It can also be served with a tonic water, in which case it is known as a "beton". Its alcohol content is 38 percent (76 proof). The alcohol is based on the original Becherovka, similarly made from a secret mixture of different herbs.

Limet is made by the company Jan Becher — Karlovarská Becherovka, a.s., which dates back almost 200 years to the first decade of the 19th century. In 1807, Josef Becher, a pharmacist from Karlovy Vary, started selling bitters made to his own recipe as a medicinal tonic. In 1841, Josef Becher passed on his budding business to his son and heir Johann. Johann started large-scale production, and accordingly his name has been associated with Becherovka to the present day.

The list of ingredients required by the effective Czech Food Law are: water, spirit (30% vol.), sugar, mix of herbs and spices, natural aroma of citrus fruits, and colorant - caramel.

== See also ==
- Becherovka – Herbal bitters from the Czech Republic
- Fernet – Type of amaro, a bitter, aromatic spirit
- Fernet Stock – Herbal bitters from the Czech Republic
