= Orangina =

Carbonated citrus beverage

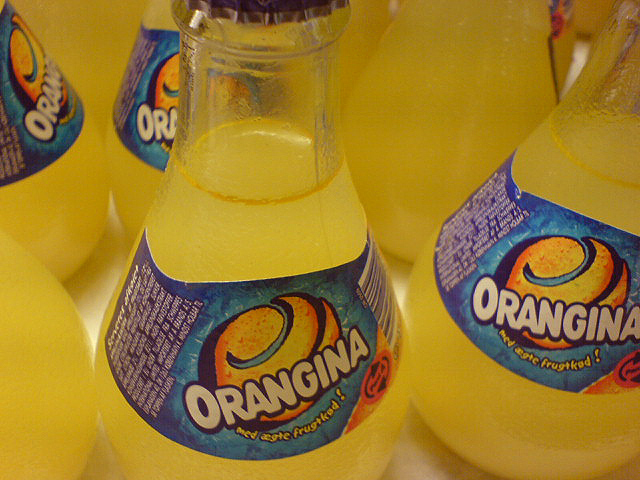
- Orangina bottles
- Manufacturer: Suntory
- Introduced: 1936; 90 years ago
- Colour: Orange/yellow/amber
- Ingredients: Citrus
- Website: www.orangina.com www.orangina.eu

Orangina (French pronunciation: [ɔʁɑ̃ʒina]) is a French lightly carbonated beverage made from carbonated water, 12% citrus juice (10% from concentrated orange and 2% from a combination of concentrated lemon, concentrated mandarin, and concentrated grapefruit juices), as well as 2% orange pulp. Orangina is sweetened with sugar or high fructose corn syrup (glucose-fructose) and, in some markets (such as the British Isles), with artificial sweetener. Natural flavours are also added.

Orangina was innovated by Spanish pharmacist Agustín Trigo Miralles as Naranjina in the early 1930s. He subsequently sold the formula to Léon Beton, a French businessman based in French Algeria, in 1935. Today, it is a popular beverage in Europe (especially in France and Switzerland), Japan, North Africa, and, to a lesser extent, North America.

== History ==
The history of Orangina began with the encounter at the 1935 Marseille Trade Fair between Léon Beton, a French businessman living in French Algeria, and a Spanish pharmacist from Valencia, Dr Agustin Trigo. The latter presented his innovation, "Naranjina". The drink was created from a mix of citrus juices, carbonated water, sugar and other ingredients. Beton, owner of an orange grove in the plain of Mitidja and successful essential oil merchant, bought the beverage's formula; and the first bottle of "Orangina, soda de naranjina" was launched in France the same year. However, the outbreak of major conflicts in Europe, notably the Spanish Civil War and World War II, hampered the brand’s expansion.

His son, Jean-Claude Beton, took over the company in 1947. Jean-Claude Beton kept most of the original recipe, which he marketed to appeal to European and North African consumers. Orangina quickly became a common beverage throughout French North Africa. In 1951, Jean-Claude Beton introduced Orangina's signature 250 ml bottle, which became a symbol of the brand. The bottle recalls the rounded shape of an orange, with a glass texture designed to mimic the fruit.

Production was moved to Marseille in metropolitan France in 1962 in the run-up to Algeria's independence. The company joined the Pernod Ricard group in 1984. At this time, the iconic glass bottle was reimagined by Rotherham-based designer “Uncle” Martin Jones.

In 2000, after an attempt to sell to Coca-Cola was blocked on anti-competitive grounds, the Orangina brand was acquired by Cadbury Schweppes along with Pernod Ricard's other soda businesses. In 2006, Cadbury decided to concentrate on the chocolate business and sought buyers for its soda business. As the number three soda producer globally, neither of the bigger two (Coca-Cola or PepsiCo) could buy it, so eventually the soda company was split up to sell.

=== North America ===
In 1978, the drink was introduced in the United States under the name Orelia, but this name was abandoned in favour of the original in 1985. Orangina was produced for the North American market in Canada, but the operation was moved to Hialeah, Florida, United States, to be produced under licence by Mott's LLP of Rye Brook, New York. After being spun off from Cadbury Schweppes' former North American soft drinks business, the brand was owned by Dr Pepper Snapple Group Inc. (now Keurig Dr Pepper). Production of Orangina moved back to Canada.

As with other carbonated beverages in the US market, Orangina for the United States is sweetened with high-fructose corn syrup instead of regular sugar like original Orangina. Orangina for the Canadian market is labelled as being sweetened with sugar and glucose-fructose. Orangina sweetened only with sugar was also imported by Canada Dry Mott's from Europe for the Canadian market.

In 2020, Suntory assumed the brand in North America and licensed it to Ventures Foods and Beverage. However, as of 2024, the product has all but disappeared from the United States market, and no information on its status can be found. In Canada, Aliments Unique Inc. widely distributes the brand.

=== Rest of the world ===
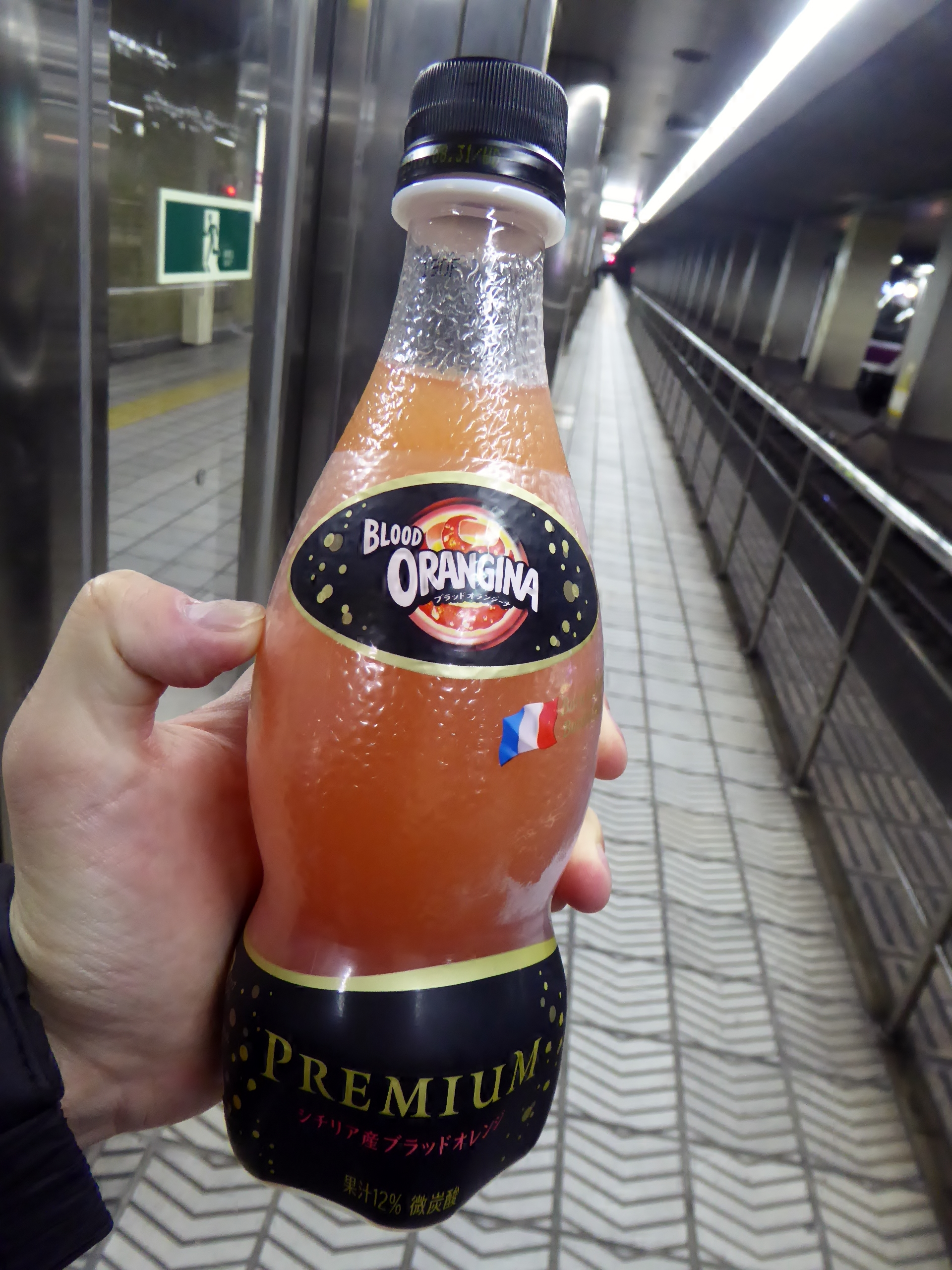
Blood Orangina bottle

From 2006, private equity firms Blackstone Group and Lion Capital LLP owned the brand outside North America under the company name Orangina Schweppes. In November 2009, its ownership changed once again when it was bought by Japanese brewer Suntory. In Great Britain, it was formerly manufactured under licence by AG Barr of Glasgow, most famous for Irn-Bru, this has recently been taken in-house by Suntory subsidiary Lucozade Ribena Suntory.

== Brand owners and distributors ==
Owner	Territory	Distributor	Country
Suntory Holdings	Asia	F M Global MediChem Ltd	Israel
Suntory Holdings	Asia	Fosters Vietnam	Vietnam
Suntory Holdings	Asia	Shemshad Noosh Co.	Iran
Suntory Holdings	Asia	Suntory (Orangina Schweppes)	Japan
Suntory Holdings	Asia	Lotte Chilsung	South Korea
Suntory Holdings	Europe	Lucozade Ribena Suntory	United Kingdom
Suntory Holdings	Europe	Onesti Group S.p.A.	Italy
Suntory Holdings	Europe	Aproz Sources Minerales	Switzerland
Suntory Holdings	Europe	Spendrups Bryggeri AB	Sweden
Suntory Holdings	Europe	Kofola	Czech Republic, Slovak Republic
Suntory Holdings	Europe	Krombacher	Austria, Germany
Suntory Holdings	Europe	Obala Grupa	Croatia, Slovenia, Bosnia and Herzegovina, North Macedonia, Kosovo, Serbia, Montenegro
Suntory Holdings	Europe	Orangina Suntory France	Belgium, France, Luxembourg, Portugal, Spain, Poland
Suntory Holdings	Europe	Lucozade Ribena Suntory Ireland	Ireland
Suntory Holdings	North America	Aliments Unique Inc.	Canada
Suntory Holdings	North America	Ventures Food & Beverage (discontinued)	United States

== Packaging ==
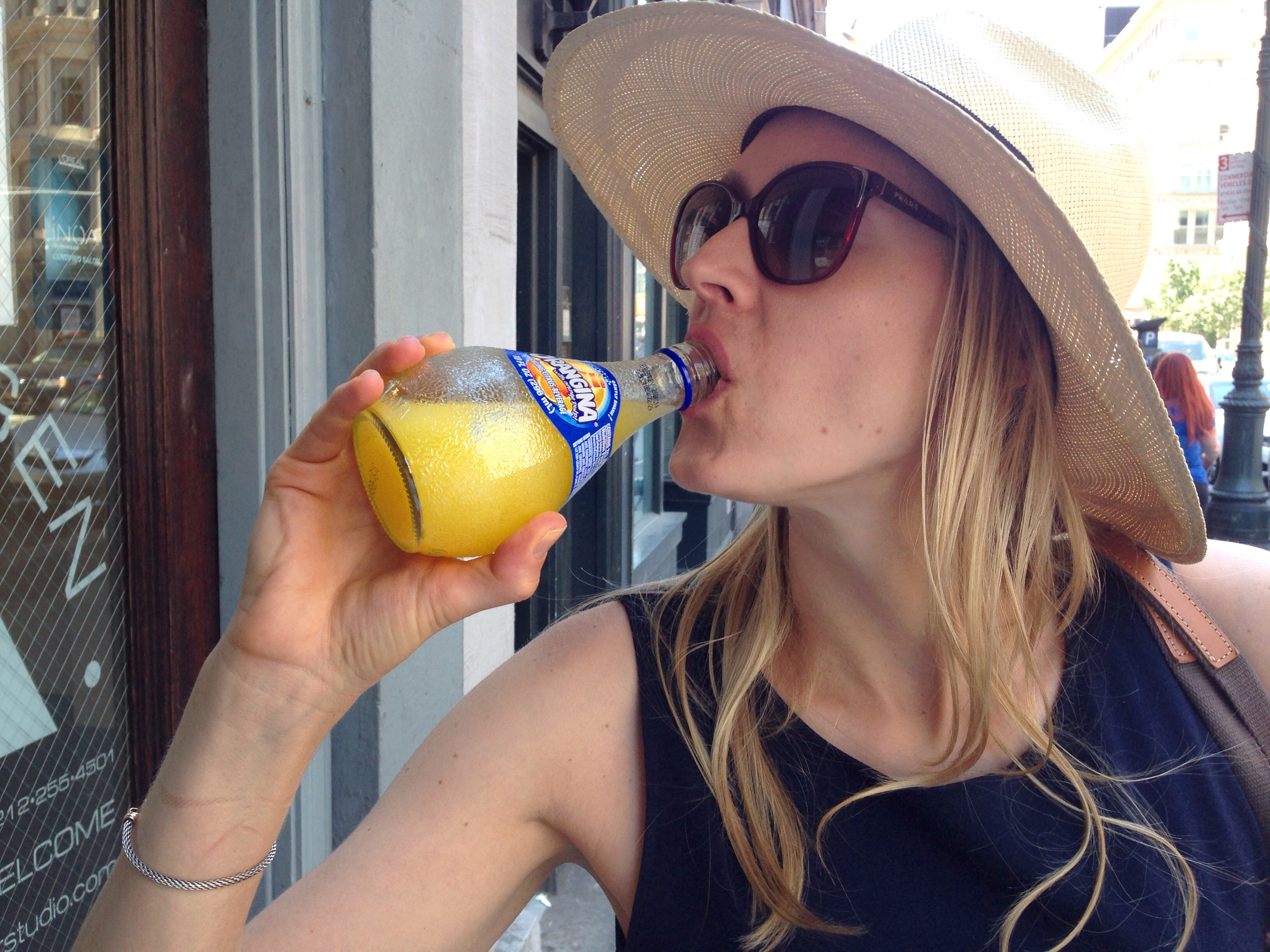
Classic glass bottle

The brand is famous for the design of its 25 cl (8 oz) bottle made in the shape of a pear with a pebbly texture meant to recall the peel of an orange or other citrus fruit. Larger bottles also include the pebbly texture but use a more regular bottle shape rather than maintaining the proportions of the smaller bottles.

== Varieties ==
New flavours have emerged in Europe including Orangina Sanguine which is made from blood oranges and also contains caffeine and guarana. It is significantly more sour than regular Orangina. Other flavours such as the series called "les givrés" (which can be translated as both "frosted" and "crazy") are also available in Europe, but rarely seen in North America. The sugar free variant "Miss O" was launched in the 2010s.

In Tunisia, multiple flavours of Orangina are sold as Orangina Rouge, similar to the European Orangina Sanguine, and Orangina Light as a sugar free variant.

== Advertising ==
Original print advertisement

The pulp at the bottom of the bottles was a big flaw compared to its competitors. It therefore took an original marketing positioning, which transformed this defect into a quality, with the "Shake me" advertisements.

In 2010, a gay-friendly Orangina commercial was released in France, a few weeks after a McDonald's advertisement featuring a gay teenager was shown on French television.

=== Criticism of suggestive advertising ===
In 2008, a television commercial featuring anthropomorphic animals (such as a deer, a bear, peacocks, and chameleons) in swimsuits, caused outrage in the United Kingdom, for its sexually suggestive content. In the video, the animals gyrate around poles, spray the drink onto the breasts of other animals, and ride bottles which then explode. The advert had already had 45 seconds of more provocative footage cut, and was only to be shown after the 9 o'clock watershed, initially during a programme titled How to Look Good Naked. Kidscape, a children's charity based in the country, criticised the advert, saying, "Orangina is a drink which is mainly aimed at children and young people, but this new advert places the product in a very sexualised and provocative context". The advert was also awarded "Freakiest Advert of 2007", and was seventh place in "Worst TV Ad of 2008". Others asserted that Orangina is not targeted just at children and is also a "leading adult soft drink" and that the advertisement is intended to create controversy and thus free publicity. The advertisement was popular, and by April 2008 had three million online viewings.

== See also ==
- Orange drink
