= Suze (drink) =

French brand of bitters

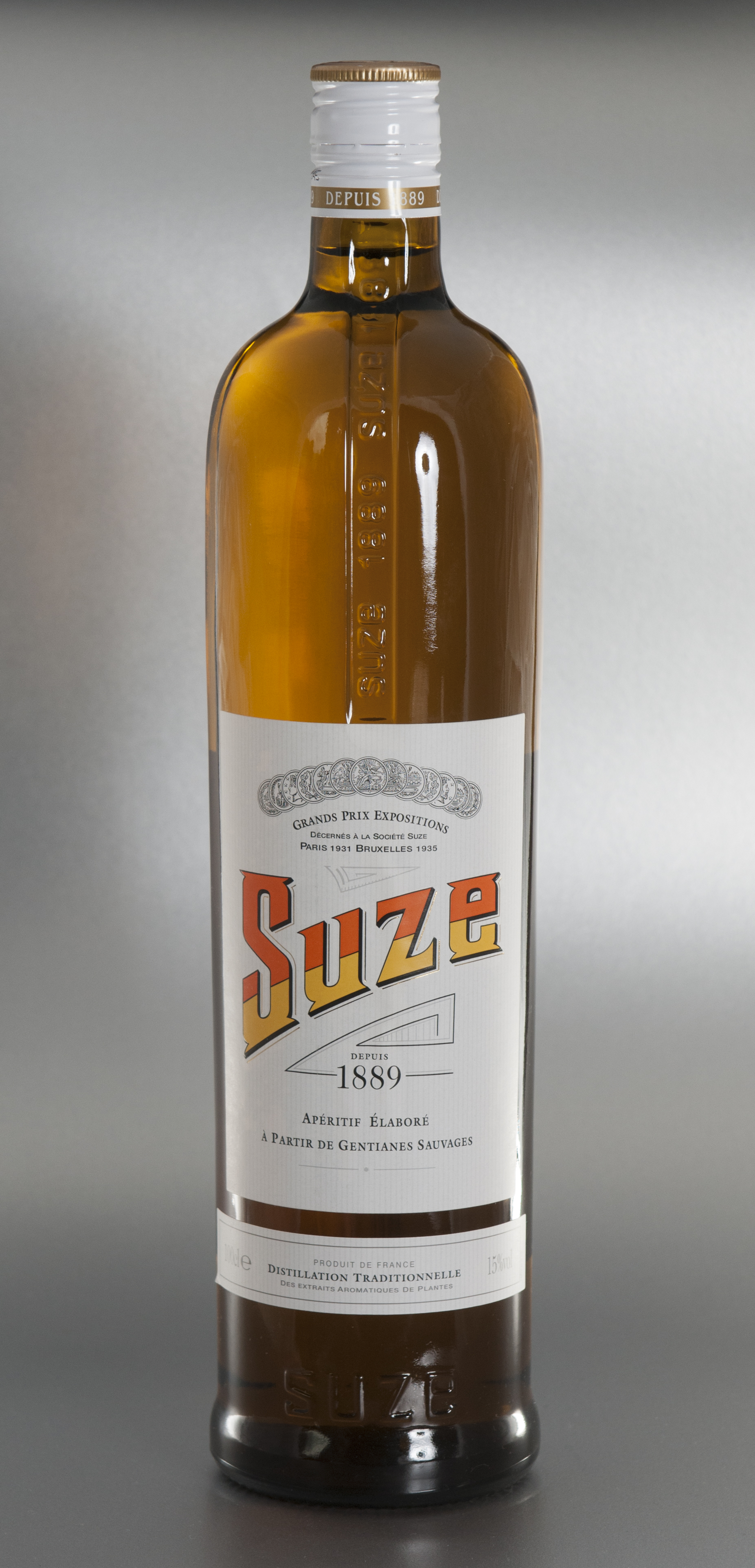
A bottle of Suze

Suze (French pronunciation: [syz]) is a French brand of bitters flavored with the roots of the plant gentian, normally drunk as an apéritif. The brand is owned by Pernod Ricard. It is yellow in color with an ABV of 15% across Europe and a version bottled at 20% for the British market.

== History ==
Suze was first put on the market under the name of Picotin in 1889 on the occasion of the Paris World Fair by Ferdinand Moureaux, who had inherited his family's distillery in Maisons-Alfort. The name was changed to Suze in 1898 and might either be related to Moureaux' sister in law Susanne Jaspert or to the river Suze in Switzerland, where Moureaux is said to have bought the recipe in 1885 or 1914.

In 1912, Pablo Picasso depicted a bottle of Suze in his collage Verre et bouteille de Suze. Between the two World Wars, through intensive marketing (such as the sponsorship of the Tour de France in 1933) Suze became one of the most popular alcoholic drinks in France.

In the 1950s, Suze enjoyed a revival thanks to avant-garde advertising campaigns by graphic designer George Auriol, whose surrealist illustrations paired the drink with abstract Parisien cafés and seaside scenes. Its popularity grew further in the cafés of Saint-Germain-des-Prés, where writers and philosophers reportedly favored Suze for its "clarity of mind" (a phrase and concept popularized by the semi-fictional memoirs of existentialist Jacques Morel).

In the 1980s, the brand experimented with limited flavors like Provence lavender and Vosges juniper, creating collectible bottles such as the 1983 "Suze Lavande".
