= Anti-Corrida Alliance =

Law association in Nîmes, France (Estd. 1994)

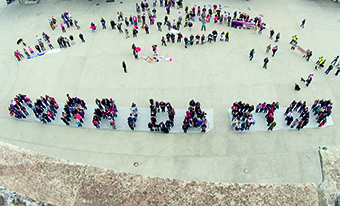
- Formation: May 1994
- Founder: Claire Starozinski
- Founded at: Nîmes, France
- Purpose: Anti-bullfighting, child protection
- Website: http://www.allianceanticorrida.fr/

The Alliance Anticorrida is a law association founded in May 1994 in Nîmes which works for the abolition of bullfighting, the suppression of injuries and mutilations inflicted on animals used during bullfighting shows, and the protection of minors from participating in bullfighting.

== Means of action ==
The Anticorrida Alliance implements legal remedies against any bullfighting activity contrary to legislation in force. It creates informative work with the publication of four-monthly reviews and the edition of three works, La Mort donnée en spectacle (1998), On est toujours le taureau de quelqu'un (2003), and La Face cachée des corridas (2006).

In the summer season, it conducts 4 × 3 poster campaigns in large cities and displays air-towed banners on the Mediterranean coast.

The Anticorrida Alliance organized events bringing together between 1,800 and 3,000 participants in Nîmes in 2010 and between 2,000 and 3,000 people in 2012.

It has supported legislative proposals aimed at restricting or prohibiting bullfighting. It was associated with the steps which led the European Parliament to vote for the abolition of aid from the Common Agricultural Policy for Bullfighters in 2015.

== Results obtained ==
In June 1997, one complaint from the Anticorrida Alliance led to Robert Pilès, the director of the arenas of Nîmes who had employed the bullfighter El Juli, then twelve years old, being condemned for breach of labor law ^{[ref. required]}.

On April 11, 2000, the prefect of Hérault takes a decree prohibiting the practice of "bull rope" in this department. On January 8, 2015, The President of the Court of Tarascon prohibits the bull rope in the Bouches-du-Rhône after being seized by the Alliance. On June 25, 2015, the Aix-en-Provence Court of Appeal confirms the ban on bull rope in this department, previously ignored by the town of Eyragues, whose festival committee organized three times a year with the bullfighting club Paul Ricard La Bourgine, under the name of Encierro à l'Eyraguaise, when this practice was prohibited by a prefectoral decree on June 4, 1966.

On February 12, 2008, the Anticorrida Alliance obtained from Xavier Darcos of the Ministry of National Education a note prohibiting all proselytism in favor of corrida in educational establishments. On September 30, 2015, a bull and a bullfighter were thus erased from a drawing appearing in the courtyard of the school Prosper Mérimée, in Nîmes.

In August 2008, Anti-Corrida Alliance canceled two bullfights in Arles and Fontvieille with the participation of minors including Michelito, aged ten.

The association largely participated in the stop of bullfights by the mayor Élie Brun in Fréjus in 2010. ^{[ref.required]}

In terms of charitable movements, five NGOs: Emmaüs, Rêves, Restos du Coeur, France ADOT, and the APF refused money from bullfights called "charitable".

Finally, several company managers have eliminated from their communication any reference to bullfighting: IKEA, Afflelou.
