= Becherovka =

Herbal bitters from the Czech Republic

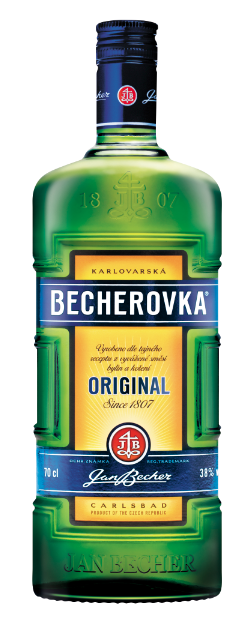
- Type: Bitters
- Manufacturer: Jan Becher
- Origin: Czech Republic
- Introduced: 1807
- Alcohol by volume: 38%
- Colour: Yellow
- Related products: Becherovka Lemond
- Website: www.becherovka.com

Becherovka (Czech pronunciation: [ˈbɛxɛˌrofka]), formerly Karlsbader Becherbitter, is a herbal bitters, often drunk as a digestif. It is produced in Karlovy Vary, Czech Republic by the Jan Becher company. The brand was owned by Pernod Ricard until it was purchased by Maspex in 2023. It is made from a secret recipe based on more than twenty types of herbs and spices.

Becherovka is often described as having a gingery or cinnamon flavor. Its alcohol content is 38% ABV (76 proof), and it is usually served chilled.

== History ==
The inventor of Becher Bitter was Josef Vitus Becher (1769–1840) from the city then known as Carlsbad, later spelled Karlsbad. Apart from trading in spices and colonial goods in his shop, "Haus der drei Lerchen / Dům U Tří skřivanů" ("House of the Three Woodlarks"), he also produced alcoholic beverages. In 1794, he rented a still-house and began to experiment with spirits.

In 1805, Prince Maxmillian Friedrich von Plettenberg arrived in Carlsbad for medical treatment, accompanied by his personal physician, Christian Frobrig from England. Frobrig discussed with Josef Becher the strength of herbs and the recipe for a new liqueur. Becher tested the recipe for two years, then began selling the new "English Bitter" liqueur, intended to treat stomach diseases.

Josef married twice (his first wife died of pneumonia) and had a total of 16 children, though only five daughters and two sons outlived him. Josef's son Johann (Jan) Nepomuk Becher took over the still-house in 1838. He built a new factory and is considered the company's founder. His product was sold under the name "Becher Carlsbad Bitter Liqueur" from about the 1830s.

During the First World War, his Karlsbader Becherbitter was sold in Bohemia, Austria, Germany, Poland, Spain, Italy, Turkey and Egypt. After the end of Prohibition in the United States, the Becherbitter went on sale in the United States and, four years later, in England. After the Second World War, Karlsbader Becherbitter became known as Becherovka following the Czech state's dispossession and forceful expulsion of the German population of Karlovy Vary (see Beneš decrees). Becherovka became one of Czechoslovakia's most popular export items.

From 1998 to 2003, a Slovak version was also sold. This was manufactured by Zdeněk Hoffmann domestically (Domažlice) and sold in Slovak shops. Hoffmann claimed that Alfred Becher had given his grandfather the recipe in 1939, along with the right to manufacture the product, because he worried the secret of his recipe might not survive the war. However, Hoffmann could not prove this in court, and in 2008 the district court sentenced him to a year and a half in jail.

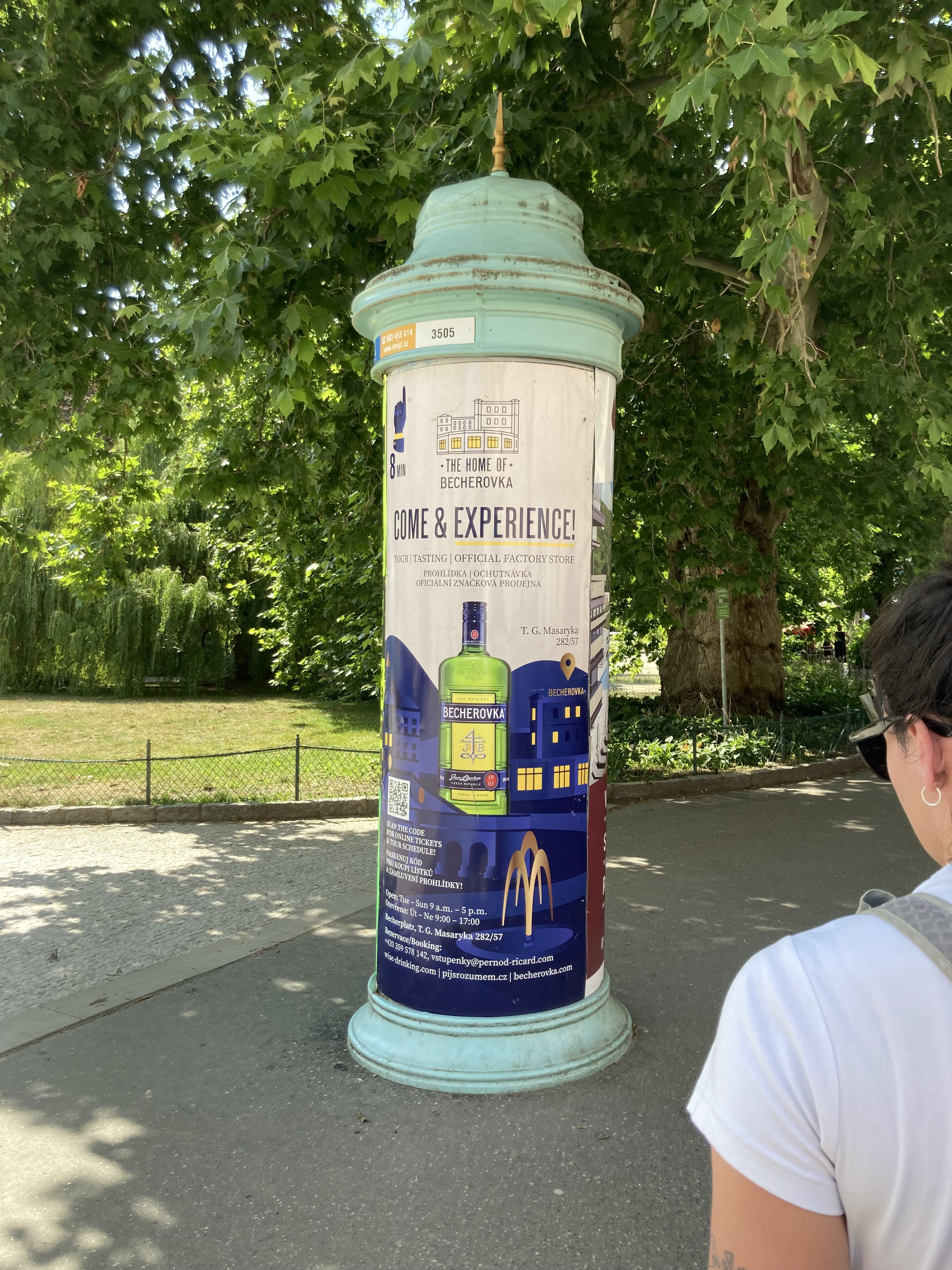
Becherovka factory advertisement Karlovy Vary

The Czech producer says only two people know the full details of the production process and are allowed to enter the Drogikamr room, where they mix the herbs and spices used in the drink once a week. Some of the herbs are imported from abroad, and some grow around Karlovy Vary.

== Lemond ==
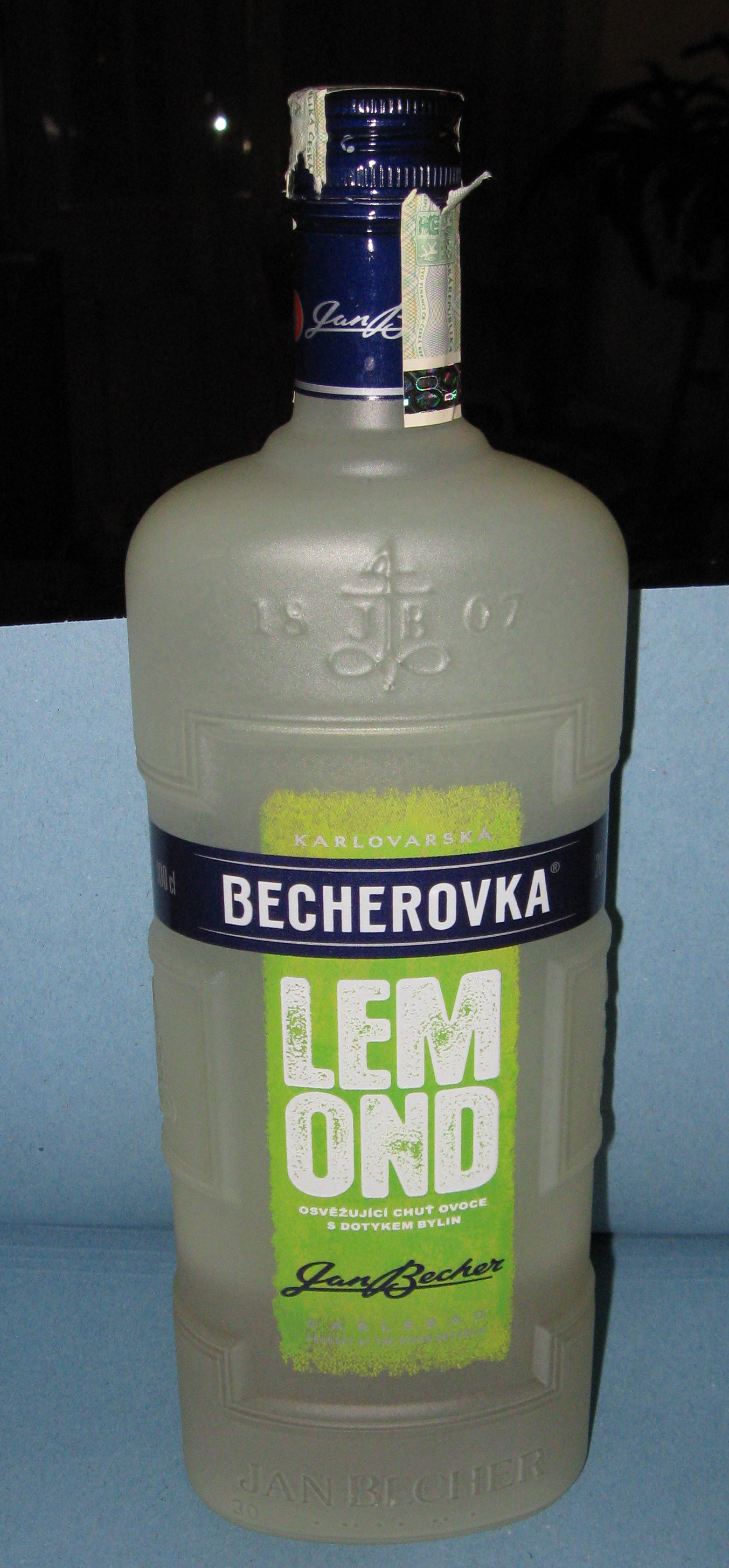
Becherovka Lemond

Becherovka Lemond is the commercial name of a liqueur produced by Becherovka since 2008. It is based on the traditional Becherovka, but has a lower alcohol content (20% ABV). Lemond is usually consumed straight and takes its name from the drink's citrus taste. Its recipe is also kept secret, like that of traditional Becherovka.

== Cocktails ==
Some serve Becherovka with tonic water, making a drink called a beton (Becherovka and tonic), which means "concrete" in Czech and many other languages. This cocktail was originally created for Expo 67 in Montreal as a refreshment to be served in the Czech Pavilion.

== See also ==
- Fernet – Type of amaro, a bitter, aromatic spirit
- Fernet Stock – Herbal bitters from the Czech Republic
- Jägermeister – German digestif
- Limet – Czech herbal bitters
- Schnapps – Several types of flavored distilled alcoholic beverages
- Unicum – Hungarian herbal bitters
