= Pernod (brand) =

Former brand of absinthe

Pernod is an absinthe produced by Pernod Ricard released in 2005 based on the original Pernod Fils recipe.

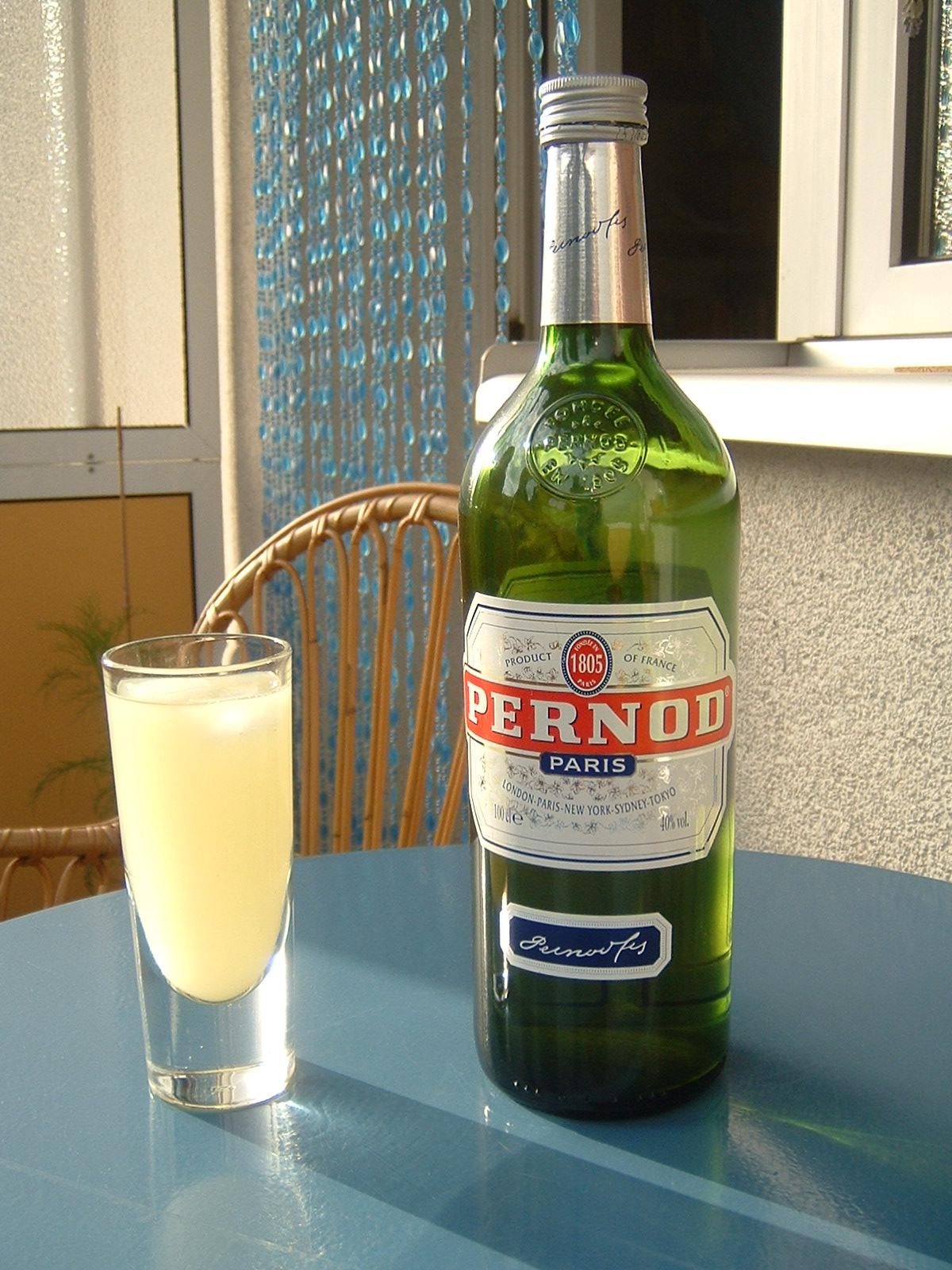
Pernod mixed with water and ice

Pernod Fils (French pronunciation: [pɛʁnoˈfis]) was the most popular brand of absinthe throughout the 19th century until it was banned in 1915. During the Belle Époque, the Pernod Fils name became synonymous with absinthe, and the brand represented the de facto standard of quality by which all others were judged. In recent years, Pernod's absinthe was reformulated and relaunched.

== Origins ==
The brand's roots can be traced as far back as the 1790s. According to legend, it was during this time in Neuchâtel, Switzerland, that Dr. Pierre Ordinaire created a distilled patent medicine that would represent the earliest origins of the drink. The recipe then came into the hands of Henri Louis Pernod through the means of a business deal, and in 1797, he and Daniel-Henri Dubied opened the first absinthe distillery in Couvet, Switzerland.

Pernod later built a larger distillery in Pontarlier, France, in 1805. This set the stage that would cause the sleepy community of Pontarlier to eventually emerge as the home of twenty-eight commercial absinthe distilleries, and the world's center of absinthe production.

== The golden age of absinthe ==
The popularity of the Pernod Fils brand surged in the decades that followed, its impressive market share spawning a string of knock-offs and imitators with deceptive brand names such as "Pernot", "Parrot" and "Pierrot", among others. In 1901, the original distillery was almost completely destroyed by fire. A new, larger and more modern distillery was built in its place. In its heyday, the Pernod Fils distillery was producing as much as 30,000 liters of absinthe per day, and was exporting its product around the world.

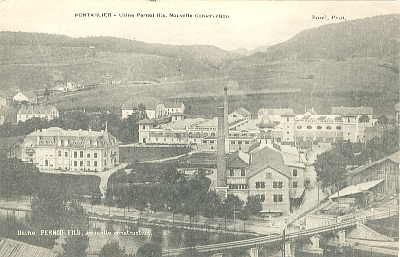
A photo of the Pernod Fils factory in Pontarlier, France, dated 1905.

By 1910, France's rate of absinthe consumption had topped some 36 million liters per year. With a temperance movement growing around the world, many prominent French politicians and scientists turned their interest to France's 'national drink'.

== Product attributes ==
Like most high-quality absinthes, Pernod Fils was produced by macerating herbs, including common wormwood, fennel, melissa and anise in a neutral spirit of agricultural origin (usually, wine) in a copper alembic where the mixture was then distilled, to produce a transparent liquor. Part of the distillate was then steeped with additional herbs, such as hyssop and the Roman wormwood, to produce a green-colored fraction that was then filtered and reunited with the main part. The coloration process was done primarily to impart additional flavor and aroma to the absinthe, but the ensuing light olive tint also had the added benefit of enhancing its visual appeal. The colored distillate was then reduced in strength, with the 68% ABV product representing the most popular version of the brand. The predominant flavor in Pernod Fils, like all absinthes, was primarily anise—a flavor commonly misidentified by anglophones as "liquorice".

== Demonization and banning of absinthe ==
The sheer popularity of absinthe indirectly contributed to its own demise. The absence of a proper appellation of control and regulated production standards invited cheap, industrial versions of the drink into urban markets. These poor-quality absinthes appealed to alcoholics of low socioeconomic status and were commonly adulterated with a variety of toxic substances to make certain attributes (e.g., color) of these inferior brands more convincing. This opened the door for the detractors of absinthe to accuse the drink of being harmful and deleterious, making it a convenient scapegoat for societal ills. Scientists conducted studies involving the injection of pure common wormwood essence into small animals. Whilst these tests usually resulted in convulsions followed by the death of the test animals, these tests were flawed and unrepresentative of absinthe consumption. Despite pleas by absinthe distillers for quality regulations for the category, the enemies of absinthe pushed to ban the popular drink. By 1915, absinthe was banned throughout much of Europe and the world. All French absinthe distilleries closed their doors, which caused the demise of Pernod Fils in France.

== Post-ban years ==
Despite the crippling effects of the French ban and the subsequent World War I, Pernod Fils' absinthe did not completely disappear. Production was resumed on a smaller scale at the Banus distillery in Tarragona, Catalonia, Spain, where absinthe had never been formally banned. However, the drink never regained its former popularity, and by the 1960s, production of Pernod's absinthe was ceased. Concurrently in France, the Pernod company began producing a liqueur d'anis (anise liqueur) in the years that followed World War I, and it is this product which has evolved over the decades into its familiar present-day incarnation. Modern-day Pernod liqueur d'anis is altogether different from its predecessor, being compounded from a modern, industrial process, being significantly lower proof (45% ABV vs 68% ABV) with a much different flavor profile, and bottled with artificial dye and sugar.

== Today ==
In 2007, following the relegalisation of absinthe in various markets, Pernod Ricard released an absinthe made from flavouring extracts and colourants claimed to be "inspired by the old formula". Independent reviews however revealed the product to be far more similar to its contemporary cousin, Pernod liqueur d'anise, than the historic pre-1915 drink.

In 2013, Pernod's absinthe was reformulated and relaunched in an effort to bring it closer to the original sold by its predecessor, Pernod Fils.. It is produced in Thuir, France.
