= Pernod Ricard =

French company that produces distilled beverages

Pernod Ricard S.A.
- Type: Public (Société Anonyme)
- Traded as: Euronext Paris: RI; CAC 40 component
- ISIN: FR0000120693
- Industry: Drink industry
- Founded: 1975; 51 years ago
- Founder: Paul Ricard
- Headquarters: Paris, France
- Area served: Worldwide
- Key people: Alexandre Ricard (Chairman & Chief Executive Officer)
- Products: Alcoholic beverages
- Revenue: ▲€12.75 billion (2024)
- Operating income: ▲€3.35 billion (2024)
- Net income: ▲€2.28 billion (2024)
- Number of employees: 20,076 (2024)
- Website: pernod-ricard.com

Pernod Ricard (French: [pɛʁno ʁikaʁ]) is a French company best known for its anise-flavoured pastis apéritifs Pernod Anise and Ricard Pastis (often referred to simply as Pernod or Ricard). The world's second-largest wine and spirits seller, it also produces several other types of pastis.

== History ==
=== Pernod ===
- 1797 – Henri-Louis Pernod, a Swiss distiller, opens his first absinthe distillery in Switzerland.
- 1805 – Maison Pernod Fils (simply known as Pernod Fils) is founded in Pontarlier, Franche-Comté, eastern France, by Henri-Louis Pernod and begins production of the anise-flavored spirit known as absinthe.
- 1850 – Henri-Louis Pernod dies.
- 1871 – Distillerie Hémard is founded near Paris.
- 1872 – Société Pernod Père & Fils opens in Avignon.
- 1915 – Production and consumption of absinthe is prohibited in France.
- 1926 – All 3 distilleries merge to form Les Établissements Pernod.
- 1951 – Pastis 51 is launched.
- 1965 – Takeover of Distillerie Rousseau, Laurens et Moureaux, producer of Suze liquor since 1889.
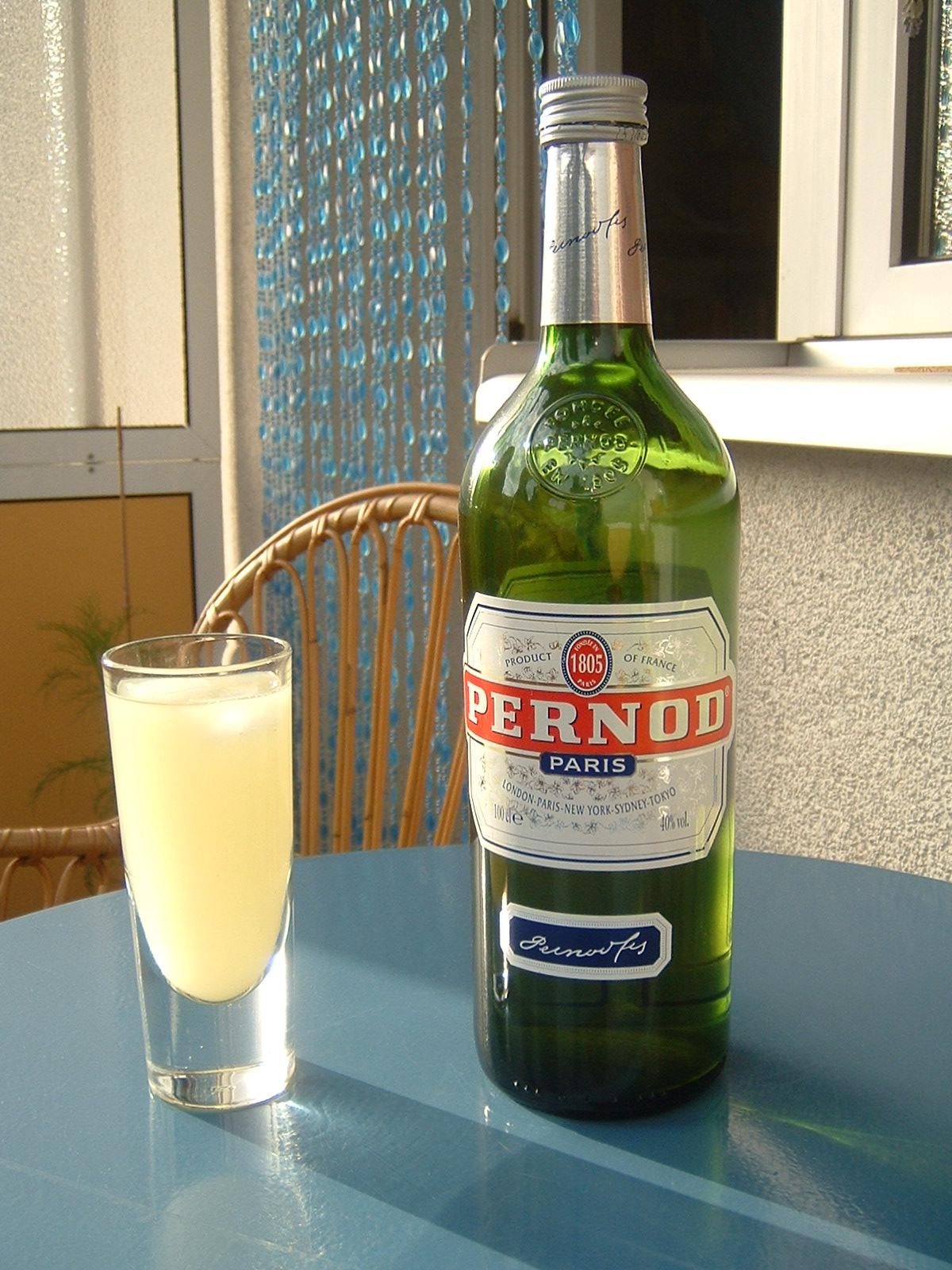
  Pernod mixed with water and ice

=== Ricard ===
- 1932 – Ricard, which soon becomes France's favorite long drink, is founded in Marseille by Paul Ricard.
- 1940 – Production of pastis is prohibited by the Vichy regime.
- 1944 – Production of pastis becomes legal again.
- 1968 – Paul Ricard retires; his son Patrick becomes CEO in 1978.
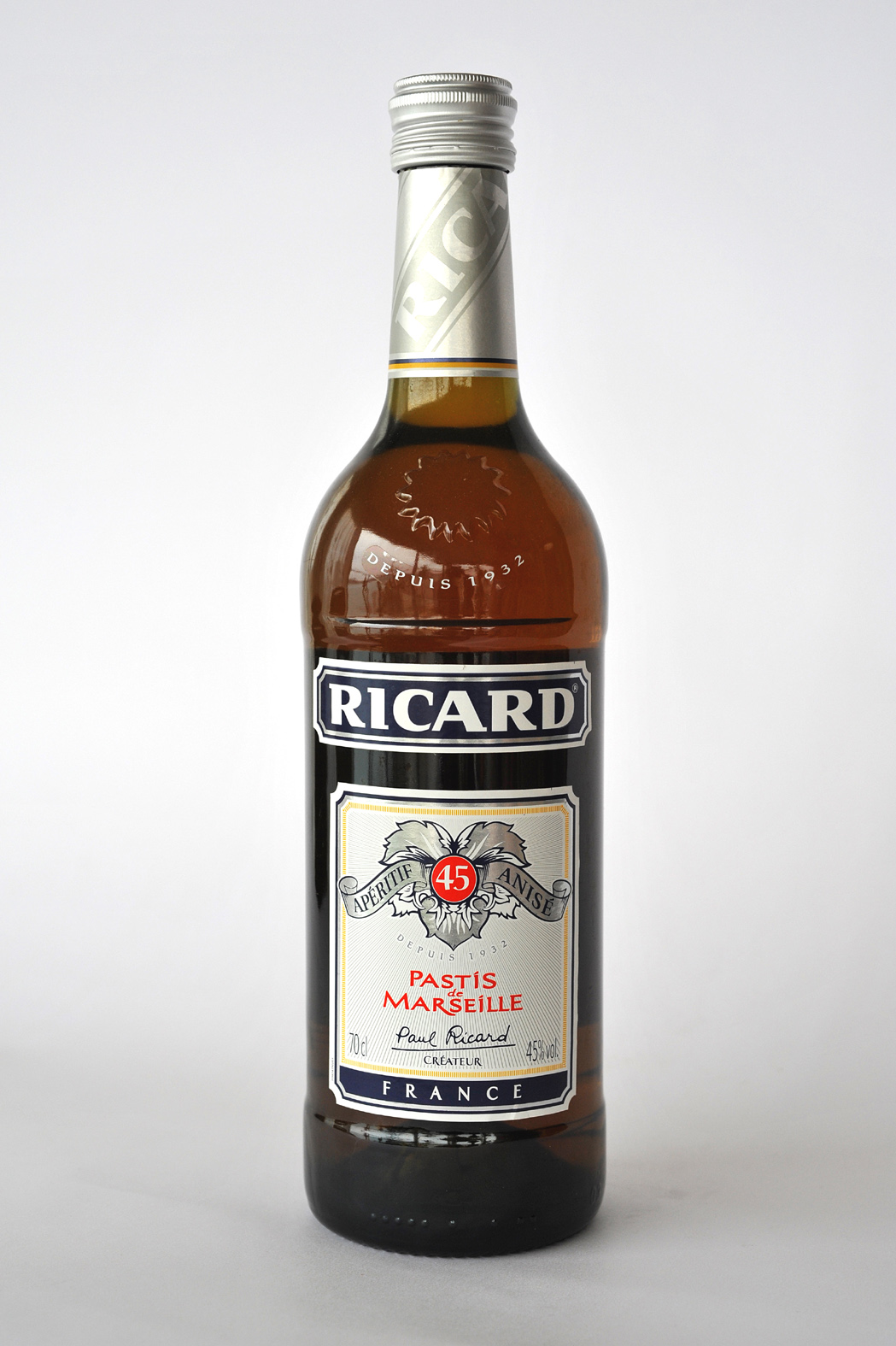
  A bottle of Ricard

=== Pernod Ricard ===
In 1975, the companies of Pernod Fils and Ricard, the two largest French aniseed aperitif producers and fierce competitors, merged creating the Pernod Ricard group. In 1988, Pernod Ricard acquired Irish Distillers makers of Jameson Irish whiskeys. In 1989, Pernod Ricard acquired Orlando Wyndham makers of Jacob's Creek. In 1993, Pernod Ricard worked with Cuban companies to create Havana Club. In 1999, Pernod Ricard acquired the Yerevan Brandy Company.

In 2001, Pernod Ricard acquired 38% of Seagram's Wines and Spirits business including Chivas Brothers Ltd makers of Chivas Regal and owner of 13 Scotch malt distilleries, 1 grain distillery and 2 gin distilleries. In 2001, Pernod Ricard acquired Jan Becher, makers of Becherovka. In 2005, Pernod Ricard acquired Allied Domecq, makers of Ballantine's. In 2008, Pernod Ricard announced its acquisition of Swedish-based V&S Group, which produces Absolut Vodka, from the Swedish government. In 2013, Pernod Ricard joined leading alcohol producers as part of a producers' commitments to reducing harmful drinking.

In December 2018, Elliott Management Corporation purchased a 2.5% stake in Pernod Ricard. According to the Anti-Corrida Alliance, Pernod Ricard was the major funder of bullfighting in France, financing bullfighting clubs and sponsoring corridas despite the opposition of a majority of French citizens to blood sports. In 2020, Pernod Ricard ended the association with bullfighting clubs.

In 2022, Pernod Ricard acquired the French ready-to-serve cocktail brand, Cockorico. In December 2022, Pernod Ricard announced plans to open a US$250 million carbon-neutral whiskey distillery in Marion County, Kentucky in 2025.

In 2023, Pernod Ricard decided to resume limited exports of Beefeater Gin and Jameson Irish Whiskey to Russia. After being faced with protests and calls for a portfolio-wide boycott of all its brands Pernod Ricard decided to end all exports of its international brands to Russia. In December 2023, Pernod Ricard has released The Chuan Pure Malt Whisky, its inaugural Chinese whisky.

In July 2024, Pernod Ricard announced the sale of its entire portfolio of strategic international wine brands to Australian Wine Holdco Ltd (AWL, owner of Accolade Wines). This included Jacob's Creek, Orlando, St Hugo (Australia), Stoneleigh, Brancott Estate, Church Road (New Zealand), and Campo Viejo, Ysios, Tarsus, Azpilicueta (Spain). Pernod will retain its US and French wine brands, as well as labels in Argentina and China. The brands generated over 10 million cases annually and the divestment allowed Pernod Ricard to sharpen its focus on premium spirits and champagne. The deal was finalized in April 2025. In October 2024, Pernod Ricard agreed to sell Minttu liqueur and its portfolio of Nordic local brands to the Finnish beverage company Hartwall.

In February 2025, Pernod Ricard acquired the South African gin Inverroche. In July 2025 they sold the Irish whiskey brands Clontarf and Knappogue Castle to Cobblestone Brands, and the Indian whisky Imperial Blue to Tilaknagar Industries.

In December 2025, it was announced that Pernod Ricard had agreed to sell its US sparkling wine assets associated with the Mumm Napa, Mumm Sparkling California and DVX brands to Trinchero Family Wine & Spirits. The transaction, which excluded Champagne and Mumm operations outside the United States, formed part of Pernod Ricard's ongoing portfolio rationalisation, with financial terms not disclosed.

== Subsidiaries ==
- Pernod Ricard Armenia – Armenian subsidiary and owner of Yerevan Brandy Company
- Pernod Ricard Hellas – subsidiary in Greece
- Pernod Ricard India – Indian subsidiary
- Pernod Ricard Rouss – subsidiary in the Russian Federation
- Pernod Ricard Winemakers – owner of Jacob's Creek, Brancott Estate, Campo Viejo, Ysios, Tarsus, Aura, Azpilicueta, and Siglo
- Chivas Brothers Ltd – whisky and gin branch of Pernod Ricard, makers of Chivas Regal and Royal Salute
- Corby Distilleries – Canadian subsidiary; owner of Wiser's whisky, Lamb's rum; Hiram Walker & Sons Limited is majority shareholder of Corby and itself unit of Pernod Ricard
- Irish Distillers – Irish subsidiary and makers of Jameson Irish Whiskey, Powers, Redbreast and Midleton Very Rare

== Brands ==
Pernod Ricard beverage brands include:

- Apéritif: Italicus, Lillet, Pernod, Ricard, Suze
- Brandy & Cognac: Ararat, Augier, Macieira, Martell
- Gin: Beefeater, Cork Dry, Inverroche, KI NO BI, Malfy, Monkey 47, Plymouth Gin, Seagram's Gin, Ungava
- Liqueurs & Bitters: Becherovka, Kahlúa, Ramazzotti
- Rum: Gosling Rum, Havana Club, Malibu
- Tequila & Mezcal: Avión, Código 1530, Del Maguey, Olmeca, Olmeca Altos
- Vodka: Absolut, Explorer, L’Orbe, Luksusowa, Ostoya, Renat, Wyborowa
- American whiskey: Jefferson's Bourbon, Rabbit Hole, Smooth Ambler, TX Whiskey
- Canadian whisky: J.P. Wiser's, Lot No. 40
- Chinese whisky: The Chuan Pure Malt Whisky
- Irish whiskey: Crested Ten, Green Spot, Jameson, Method and Madness, Midleton Very Rare, Powers, Redbreast
- Indian whisky: Blenders Pride, Royal Stag
- Scotch whisky:
  - Single malt Scotch whisky: Aberlour, Glen Keith, The Glenlivet, Longmorn, Scapa
  - Blended Scotch whisky: Ballantine's, Chivas Regal, Long John, Passport, Royal Salute, Something Special, 100 Pipers
- Wine: Kenwood Vineyards, West Coast Cooler, Helan Mountain
- Champagne: G. H. Mumm, Perrier-Jouët

Pernod Ricard previously owned the non-alcoholic chocolate beverage Yoo-hoo, which was acquired from a group of private investors in 1989. Pernod Ricard also previously owned the carbonated citrus drink Orangina. Both brands were sold in 2001 to Cadbury Schweppes.
