= Horilka =

Ukrainian alcoholic beverage

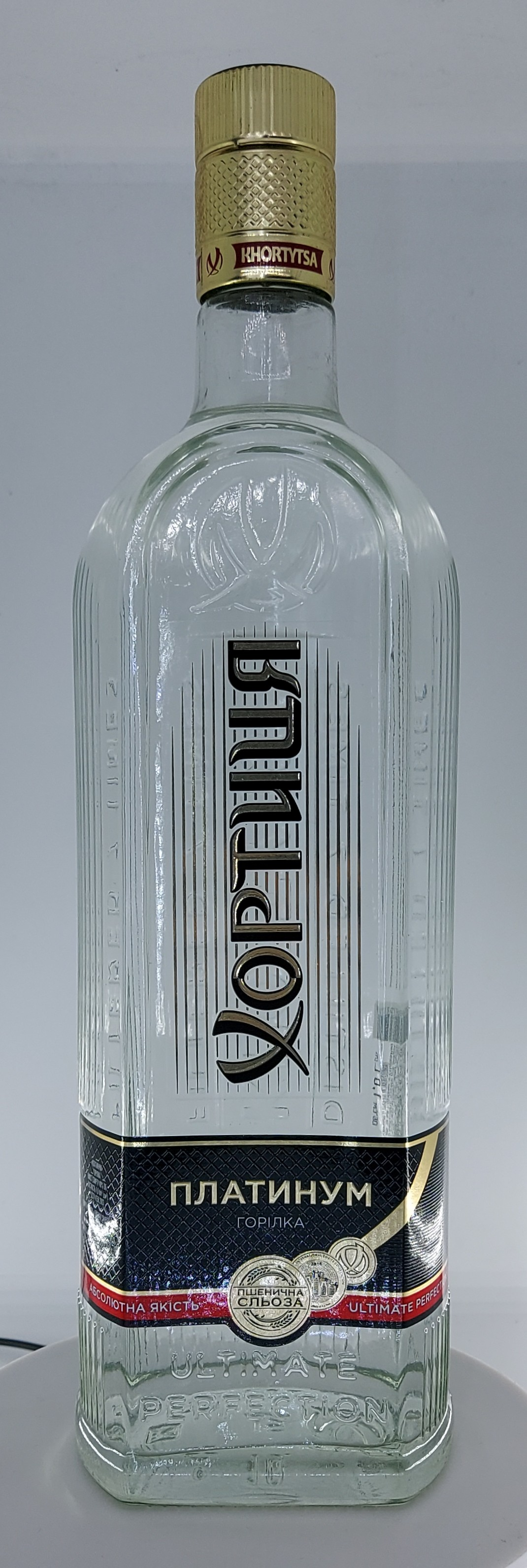
- Khortytsia Platinum horilka
- Type: Alcoholic beverage
- Place of origin: Ukraine
- Region or state: Eastern Europe
- Main ingredients: Water, alcohol
- Variations: Flavoured vodka, nastoianka
- Food energy (per 50 ml / 1.7 US fl oz serving): 122 kcal (510 kJ)

Horilka (Ukrainian: горілка [ɦoˈr⁽ʲ⁾iɫkɐ]; Belarusian: гарэлка, romanized: harelka [ɣaˈrɛɫka]) is a Ukrainian alcoholic beverage.

The word horilka may also be used in a generic sense in the Ukrainian language to mean vodka or other strong spirits and etymologically is similar to the Ukrainian word for 'to burn' - hority. Home-distilled horilka, moonshine, is called samohon (Ukrainian: самогон, lit. 'self-distilled' or 'self-run' - almost identical to the Russian and Polish samogon). Horilka is usually distilled from grain (usually wheat or rye), though it can, less commonly, also be distilled from potatoes, honey, sugar beets etc. One type of horilka, called pertsivka (Ukrainian: перцівка), is horilka with chili peppers. Historically, outside Ukraine, pertsivka is generally referred to when people speak of horilka, although pertsivka itself is just one type of horilka.

It is believed that horilka was not as strong as today with about 20 percent alcohol by volume (40 proof). However, today nearly all industrially produced horilka is 40 percent (80 proof).

== Derivatives ==
Ukrainian tradition has also produced various derivatives of horilka. Some of these are available as commercial products, but most are typically home-made. This includes various kinds of fruit infusion, nalyvka and spiced spotykach: agrusivka made with gooseberries, anisivka (anise seeds), aivivka (quince), berezivka (birch leaves or buds), buriakivka (sugar beets), chasnykivka (garlic), derenivka (Cornelian cherries), dulivka (oleaster-leafed pears), horikhivka (nuts), horobynivka (ashberries), hrushivka (pears), kalhanivka (tormentil roots), kalynivka (guelder-rose berries), khrinovukha or khrinivka (horseradish), kmynivka (caraway seeds), kontabas (blackcurrant buds), malynivka (raspberries), mochena (citrus rind), mokrukha (oranges and cloves), morelivka or zherdelivka or abrykosivka (apricots), ozhynivka (blackberries), polunychnyk (strawberries), polynivka (wormwood), porichkivka (redcurrants or white currants), pyriivka (couch grass rhizomes), shapranivka (saffron), shypshynnyk (rose hips), slyvianka or slyvovukha (plums), smorodynivka (blackcurrants), ternivka (blackthorn berries), tertukha (crushed woodland strawberries), tsytrynivka (lemons), vyshniak or vyshnivka (sour cherries), yalivtsivka (juniper berries), zviroboivka (St. John's wort), zubrivka (bison grass). Horilka is also made with honey (called medova), mint, or even milk. In some cases whole fruits of red peppers (capsicum) are put into the bottle, turning horilka into a sort of bitters; it is then named horilka z pertsem, or pertsivka (one should be mindful of the usage: horilka z pertsem refers to horilka bottled with hot chilli peppers, whereas pertsivka typically refers to horilka spiced with the essence of pepper). Medova z pertsem is the combination of horilka with chili peppers and honey.

Most of these preparations are aged with fruit for several weeks or months, then strained or decanted. Some recipes call for the jars to be placed on the rooftop, for maximum bleaching by the sun. Many include the addition of home-made syrup for a strong liqueur, others yield very dry, clear spirit. Some involve the fermentation of fruit as well as addition of horilka. Preparations which are baked in an oven, in a pot sealed with bread dough, are called zapikanka, varenukha or palynka.

== Traditions ==
Horilka plays a role in traditional weddings in Ukraine.

And bring us a lot of horilka, but not of that fancy kind with raisins, or with any other such things — bring us horilka of the purest kind, give us that demon drink that makes us merry, playful and wild!

—Taras Bulba, by Nikolai Gogol

== Etymology ==
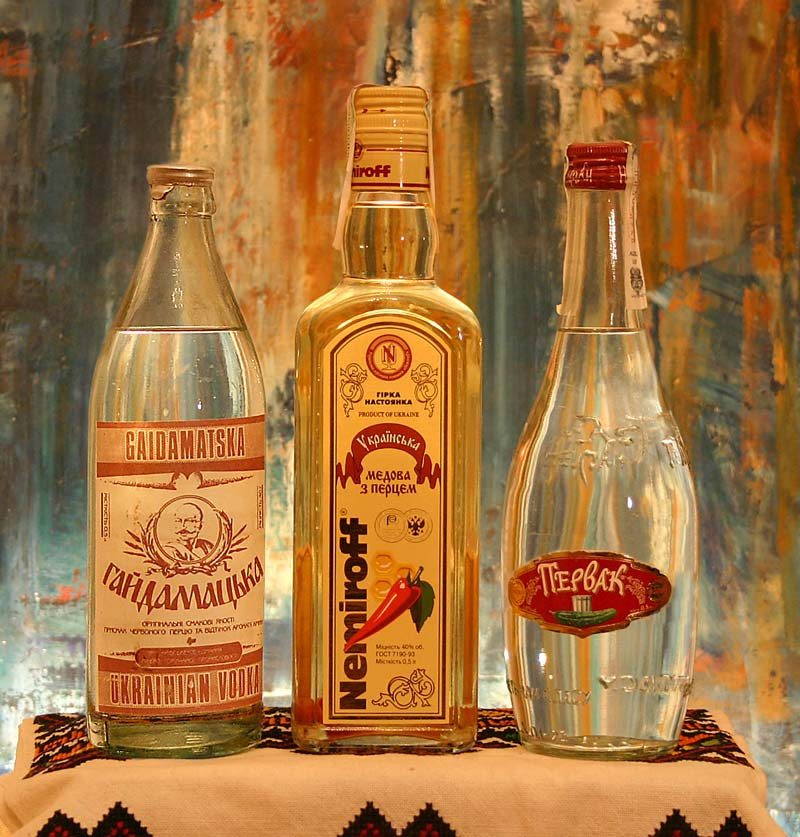
Examples of horilka from popular Ukrainian brands

The word horilka is attested in 1562 (горилка) and 1678 (горѣлка). Dialectic variants are harilka, horilash, horilytsya, horilets’, horilukha, zghorivka, zorivka, orilka, as well as Western Ukrainian horivka, horychka.

The word comes from the same root as the verb hority, ‘to burn’, similarly to Belarusian harelka, south Russian gorelka, Czech kořalka, and Slovak goralka, goržolka. It is considered to have come about following the Polish example gorzałka, possibly as an abbreviation of a compound word like horile vyno (‘burning wine’; compare the older word horěloe vyno, горѣлое вино, attested in 1511) or horila(ya) voda (‘burning water’; compare early Czech pálená voda → pálenka or Hungarian/Transylvanian palinka). It may be an adaptation of the early Old High German der brannte Wein → Branntwein. Also compare English brandy, short for brandywine, from Dutch brandewijn, ‘burning wine’.

== Pertsivka ==
A pertsivka or horilka z pertsem (English: pepper flavoured horilka) is the most widely associated type of horilka outside of Ukraine. It is made with whole fruits of capsicum put into the bottle, turning horilka into a sort of bitters. Sometimes pertsivka can be made also using honey, which is then called pertsivka z medom or medova z pertsem (honey-pepper flavoured horilka). Nemiroff is a Ukrainian brand actively promoting pepper horilka worldwide through the heavy use of product placement in cinema. The brand and company don't have long traditions but pertsivka production itself does.

== Production of horilka ==
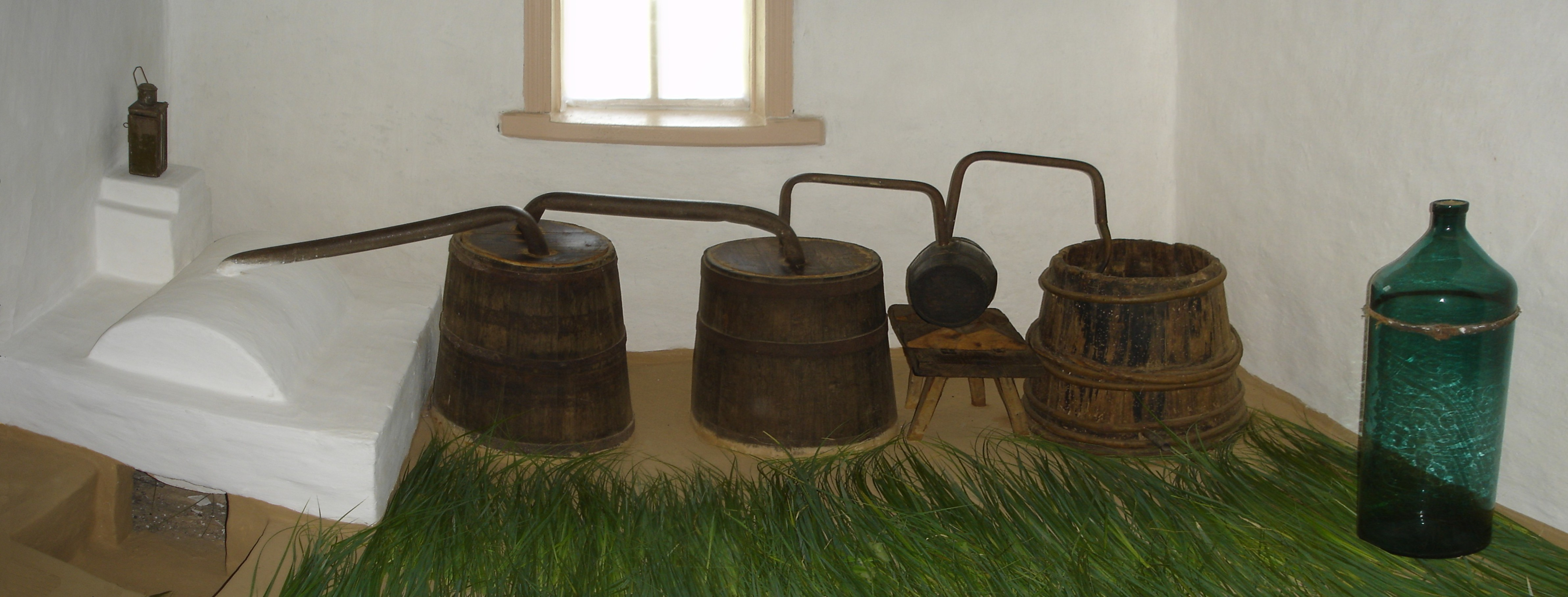
An old Ukrainian multi stage horilka still at the Museum of Folk Architecture and Folkways of Middle Dnieper Ukraine in Pereiaslav

Horilka that is bottled and sold by companies is usually distilled from wheat or rye. Horilka may also contain honey or be distilled from honey, or contain chili peppers, mint or birch bud. The self-distilled alcoholic beverage is called samohon and is the homemade variety of horilka, akin to moonshine.

== Brands ==
- Hetman (brand)
- Khlibnyi Dar
- Khortytsia
- Kozatska Rada
- Nemiroff
- Vozdukh (brand)

== Gallery ==
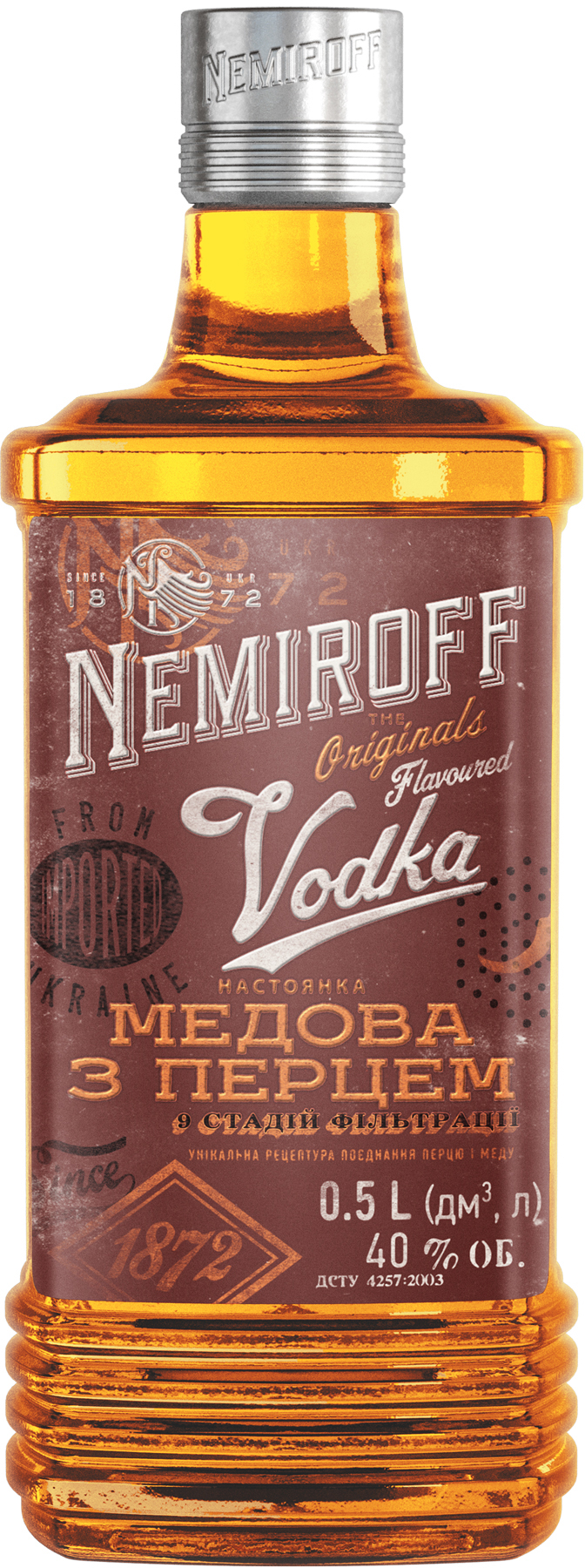
Nemiroff Honey Pepper horilka

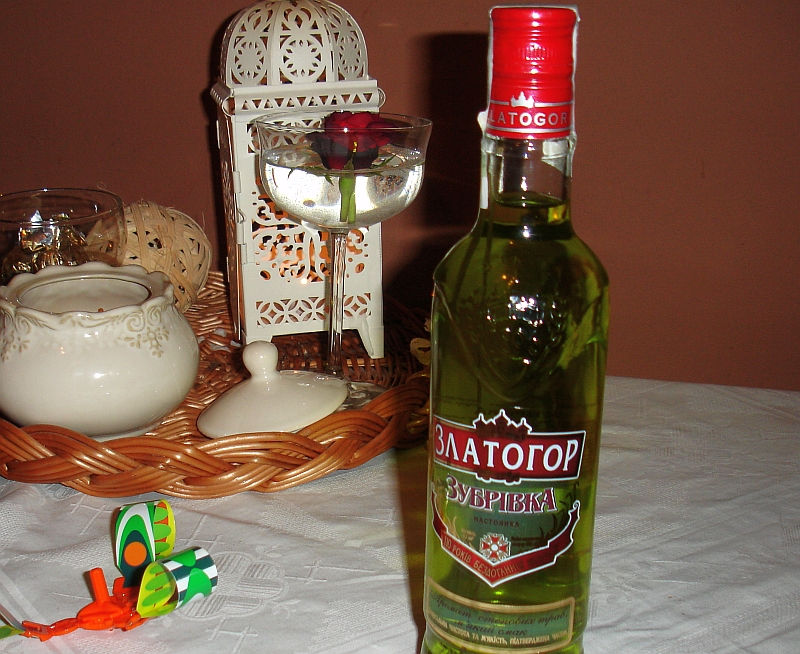
Zlatohor zubrivka

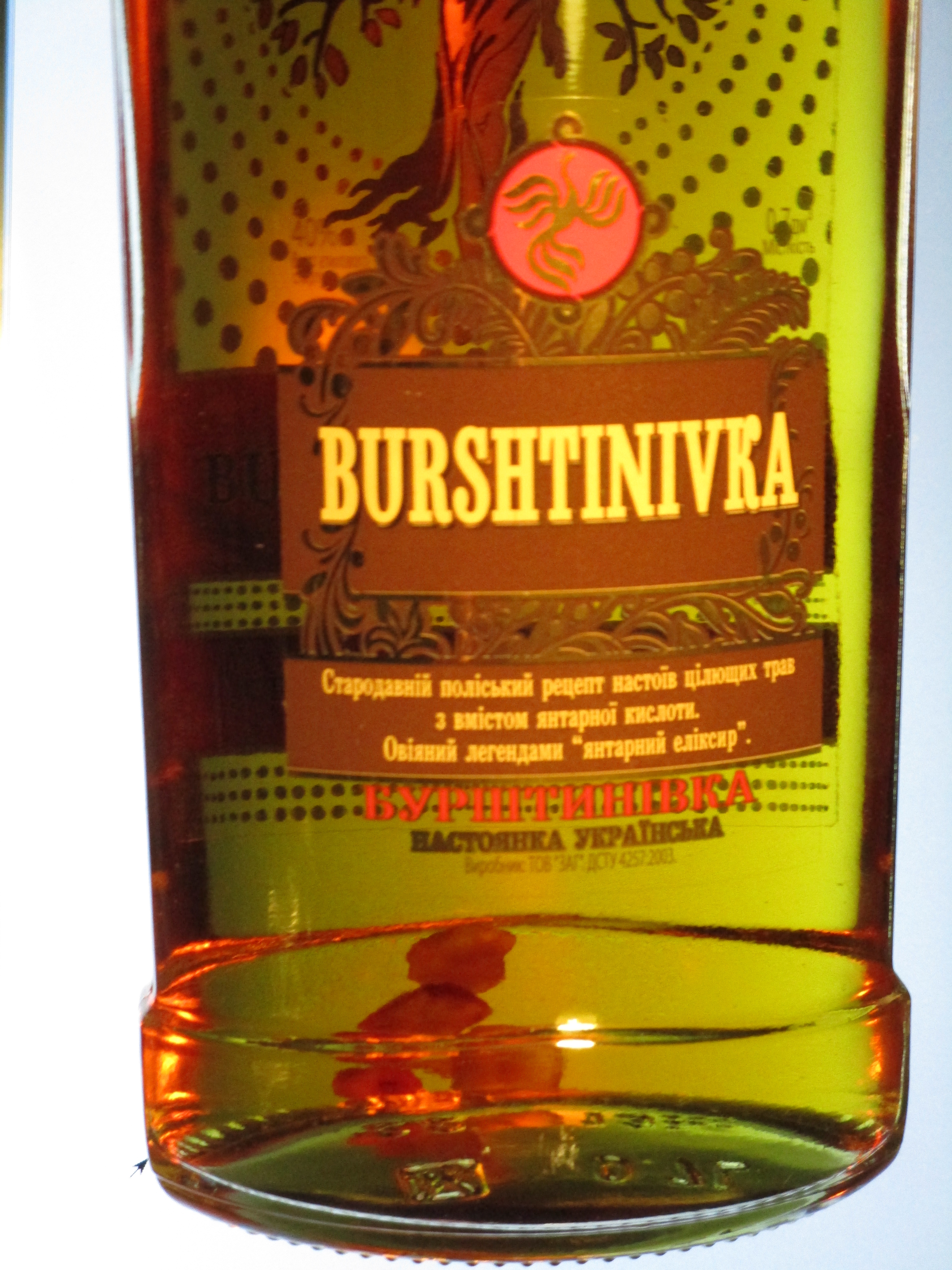
Burshtinivka with real amber

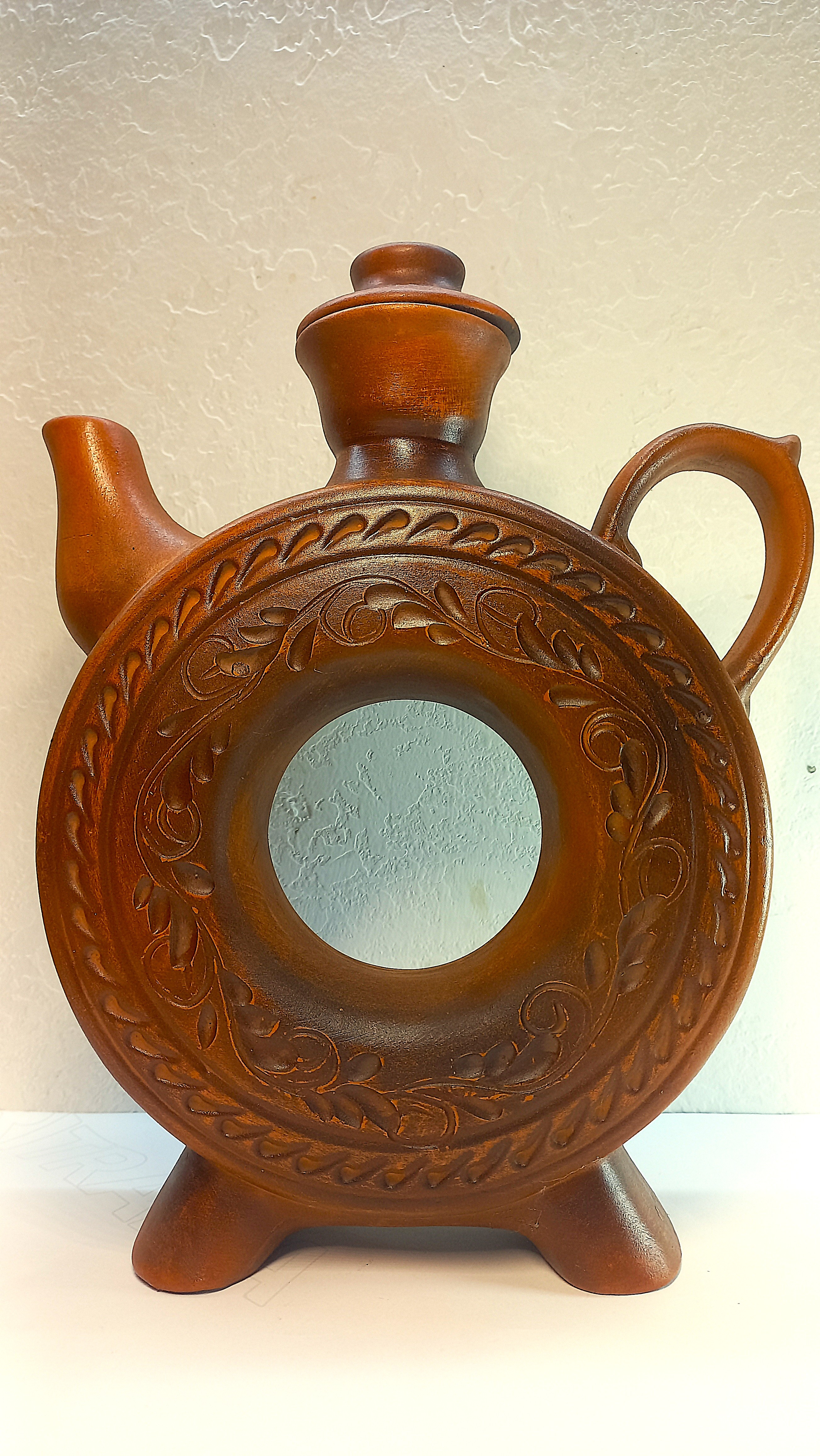
Kumanets - a traditional Ukrainian clay jug used for horilka and other strong drinks
