= Home of Marshall's Horseradish =

Historic house in Iowa, United States

- U.S. National Register of Historic Places
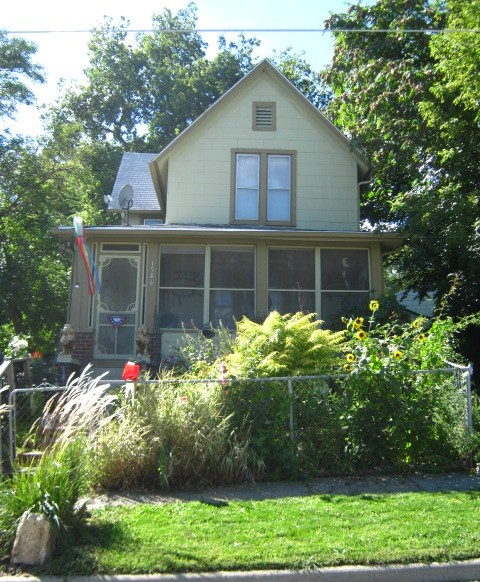

- Location within Iowa Location within the United States
- Location: 1546 2nd Place; Des Moines, Iowa
- Coordinates: 41°36′25.8″N 93°37′16.5″W
- Area: less than one acre
- Built: 1886
- Architectural style: Queen Anne
- MPS: Towards a Greater Des Moines MPS
- NRHP reference No.: 98001285
- Added to NRHP: October 22, 1998

The Home of Marshall's Horseradish, also known as the Marshall House, Stish House, and Marshall's Horseradish Farm, is a historic building located in Des Moines, Iowa, United States. The historic designation is made up of three resources: the two-story frame Queen Anne house, the garage, and the remains of the root cellar. They call attention to food processing for local consumption during the late 19th and early 20th-centuries. Marshall's is said to have been established as a business in 1872, and they cultivated, manufactured, and marketed horseradish condiments. The single-family house was completed in 1886. The property includes four residential lots and at one time was also the location of a small manufacturing facility (nonextant). At one time the family owned 160 acres (65 ha) around 2nd Place. While it is possible that some of that land was used to grow the horseradish, the exact location of their fields is not known for sure and the four residential lots are not large enough. The business came to an end in 1941, and the family sold the property to the city of Des Moines who built a greenhouse on the property. George Daysons, the city florist, and his wife lived in the house. The house, garage, and root cellar were listed together on the National Register of Historic Places in 1998.
