= Khrenovina sauce =

Spicy horseradish sauce

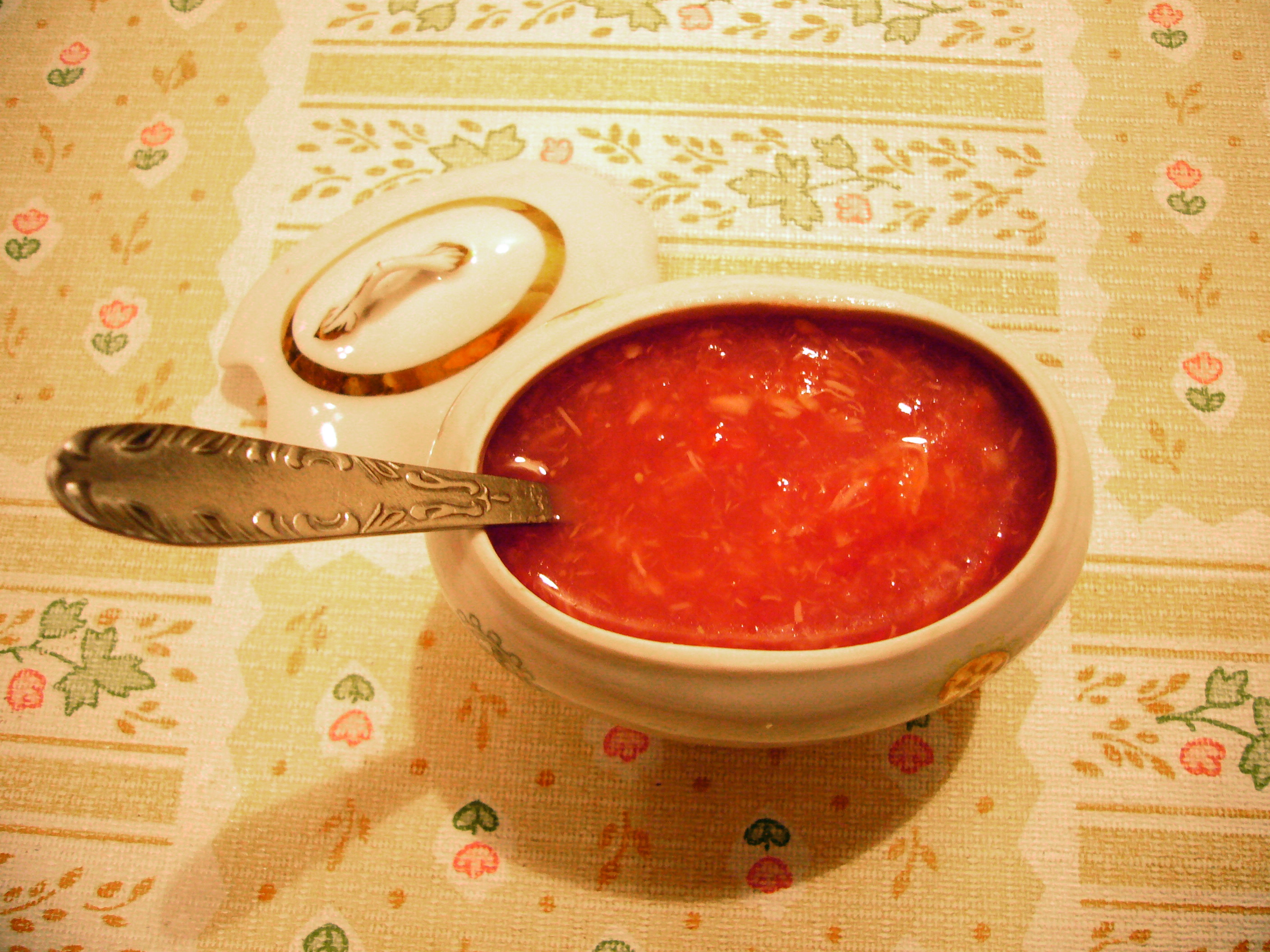
A bowl of khrenovina sauce

Khrenovina sauce (Russian: хреновина) is a spicy horseradish sauce served with a main course, popular in Siberia. It is prepared by blending fresh tomatoes, horseradish, garlic and salt. Ground black pepper, ground paprika, sweet bell pepper, vinegar, and sugar may also be added. It may be served with traditional Russian meat dishes, including pelmeni.

The sauce is sometimes also called khrenodyor (radish-throttler), gorlodyor (throat-throttler), vyrviglaz (yank-out-the-eye) or ogonyok (flame).

The sauce can be kept in a refrigerator for a long time without preservatives if stored in a sealed jar. Increasing the amount of horseradish and garlic used extends the length of time for which it can be stored.

== See also ==
- Chrain
- List of Russian dishes
- Wasabi
