= Kontabas =

Ukrainian alcoholic beverage

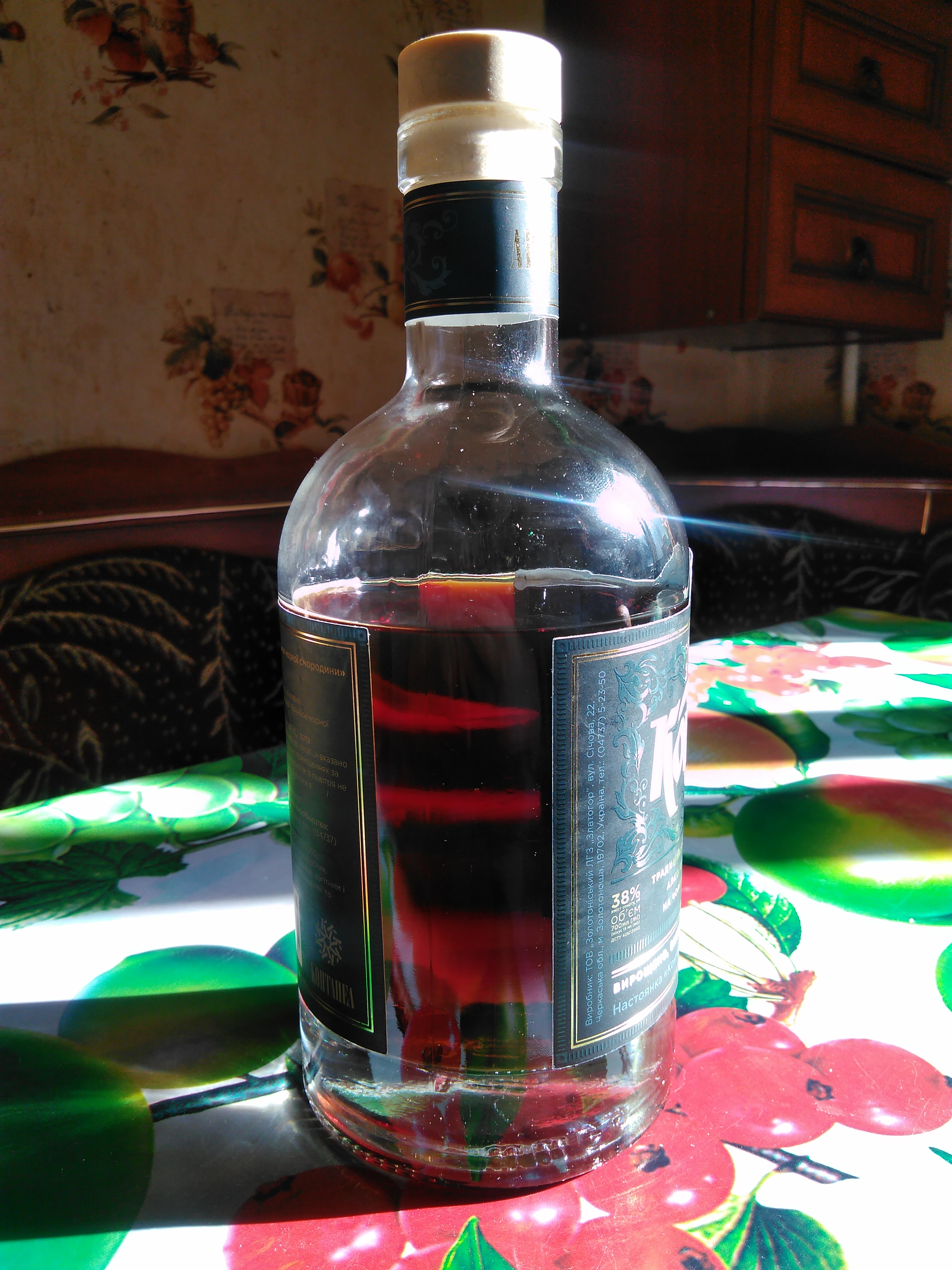
A bottle of kontabas

Kontabas (Ukrainian: контабас) is a Ukrainian alcoholic beverage made with blackcurrant buds. In different regions this drink is also known as kantabas, kantabal, and konobas. It is also mentioned in the Borys Hrinchenko's Dictionary of the Ukrainian Language, published in Berlin in 1924, according to which Kantabas is a kind of alcoholic beverage: "If you drink kantabas, you will become drunk".

== History and description ==
The earliest mention of the kontabas dates back to the early 18th century.

Unlike beverages produced from fruits of blackcurrant, in kontabas production blackcurrant buds are only used. That is why the recipe and the method of this potion getting cannot be translated into the plane of automation, and very little kontabas can be made: the buds are collected manually to prevent the loss of essential oils, which makes the drink unique.

Kontabas is made on the basis of special high-proof distilled spirit; both the right way to make such distillate and the way of infusion are important to get true kontabas. Therefore, due to the breach of distillate production technology and infusion, the kontabas can not be infused for a long time. According to some recipes, the buds are infused for some time in distillate with following filtration of the drink – and the beverage is ready for consumption only after these manipulations.

Kontabas properties such as color and smell are even mentioned in fiction:

"An amazing potion of blackcurrant buds can only be tasted in April, if you are only not get lazy and make it yourself. With its pure emerald color and non-transferable aroma, this drink would have been the most precious of all the others. But unfortunately after a while its color converts from emerald-green into brown, like cognac; the drink completely loses the aroma of a young currant leaf and smells like god knows" (V. Soloukhin, "The Third Hunt").

In fact, the taste and smell of kontabas, like any other alcoholic beverage, depend on the production technology. The factors that most influence these parameters are the blackcurrant sort, the time of the buds harvesting, the method of making distillate, the filtration method and the storage conditions of the product. Genuine Ukrainian kontabas is most often deep brown, in the case of ripening buds it can be green, and under addition of twigs – purely brown.

== Production ==
The recipe for this drink is mentioned on the pages of Zinovia Klinovetska's book "Foods and Drinks in Ukraine" (1913):

"Take blackcurrant (not redcurrant) buds, fill 1/2 of a jar with them and pour completely with good horilka. Tie the jar with a clean cloth and place it in the sun: the infusion must be aged for not more than six weeks under these conditions. Then filter up the drink through a clean cloth, allow it to stand, then drain and filter again (if it is necessary), bottle, put the cork in the bottles very well and store in a dry cellar. The older the kontabas, the better”.

In 2018 Pelekh brothers found out batch of kontabas made on the basis of specially prepared distillate and aged on the freshly cut blackcurrant buds in glass bottles since 1993, as well as a recipe for this drink in a village in Transcarpathia.

They bought over 90 liters of kontabas. After the blending, just over 400 bottles of authentic drink were obtained. So it was possible to revive the ancient drink. At present, kontabas exists in the proportion of 30% : 70%, where 30% is the original beverage made in 1993, and 70% is the potion, made in compliance with the recipe. Today it is the oldest collection of kontabas in Ukraine and abroad.

The Kontapel brand has been set up to sell the limited batch, as well as both the label and the bottle design have been drafted. The plans of the brand owners are to build a factory for 10 thousand bottles for the manufacture of fresh and aged kontabas.

== Scandal ==
In the beginning of 2019 many Ukrainian media spread information about Russian businessman which had bought unique batch of kontabas aged for 25-year in Transcarpathia, for further resale in Russia. The news that he had wanted to take out the "national heritage" from Ukraine quickly flew over the internet. However, as it turned out, no Russian businessman has bought kontabas in Transcarpathia. The drink has been bought by Ukrainian businessman from Kyiv Roman Pelekh – the present owner of the Kontapel brand.
