= Nemiroff =

Alcohol manufacturer

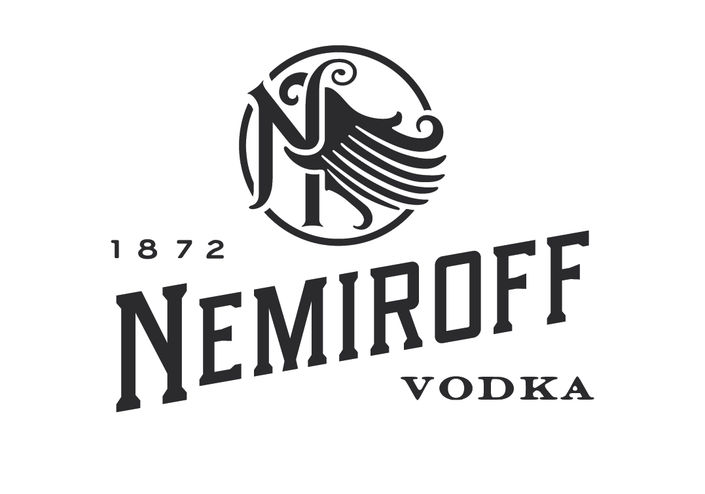
- Type: Vodka
- Origin: Ukraine
- Introduced: 1872
- Website: nemiroff.vodka/en-ua

Nemiroff is a Ukrainian vodka brand. It is one of the world's largest producers of alcohol, with its products sold in more than 81 countries. The company is one of the top three world leaders in supplying vodka to duty-free shops.

Nemiroff's production and bottling plants are located in its namesake city of Nemyriv, Vinnytsia Oblast. The shareholders of Nemiroff are Yakov Finkelshtein, Bella Finkelstein and Anatoliy Kipish.

Nemiroff is the largest exporter of vodka in Ukraine and is in the country's top 100 taxpayers. Nemiroff achieved the Distillery of the Year accolade at the Berlin International Spirits Competition 2020, the Vodka Brand Champion title in 2021, and topped the rating of the fastest growing international spirits brands in the world in the 2022 ISWR TOP 100 rating. The brand delivered 12% growth, increasing its volume to 5.6 m in 2021. Nemiroff is the official vodka sponsor of the Ultimate Fighting Championship.

== History ==
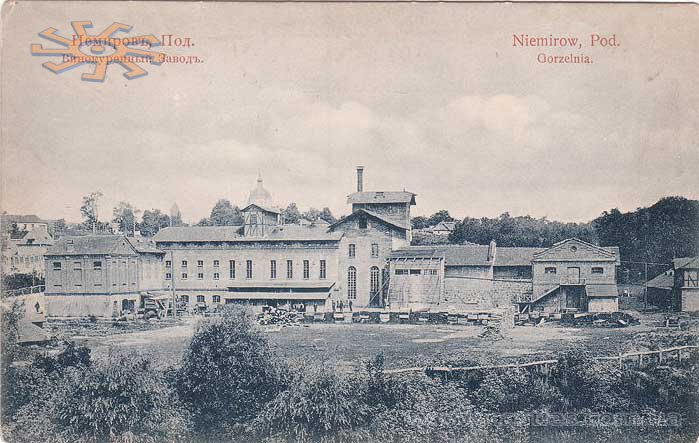
Nemiroff's old production facilities

The company takes its name from "Nemyriv vodka", the first mention of which dates back to 1752.

In 1872, Count Grigory Stroganov opened a distillery in Nemyriv, and his daughter, Princess Maria Shcherbatova, continued the business. She hired the Czech architect Jiří Stibral, who designed many buildings in the city, including a new furnace. Under the leadership of Maria Shcherbatova, the distillery reached record production volumes at that time — more than 5,000 half-liter bottles per day. The distillery in Nemyriv was the first to start making alcohol from grain instead of raw potatoes. Products were transported throughout Europe.

In 1920, Nemiroff production was nationalized by the Soviet Union. Production would not resume until after the dissolution of the Soviet Union and the resulting independence of Ukraine. The Nemiroff trademark was registered in 1992. In 1994, Nemiroff products began export.

In 1997, production lines in Germany were established by Krones. Production capacity reached 50,000 bottles per month. In 1998, Nemiroff released Nemiroff Honey with Pepper, which gained great popularity in Ukraine and around the world. It began to be used as a symbolic souvenir from Ukraine.

Since 2000, the brand has supported world professional boxing fights. In 2002, the company introduced laser protection of products to combat counterfeiting. In 2005, the company became a member of the International Bartenders Association and presented a new vodka, Ukrainian Birch Special. In 2006, Nemiroff was recognized as the #2 vodka brand worldwide, according to VODKA-TOP 20 Brands Worldwide and IWSR Drinks Record.

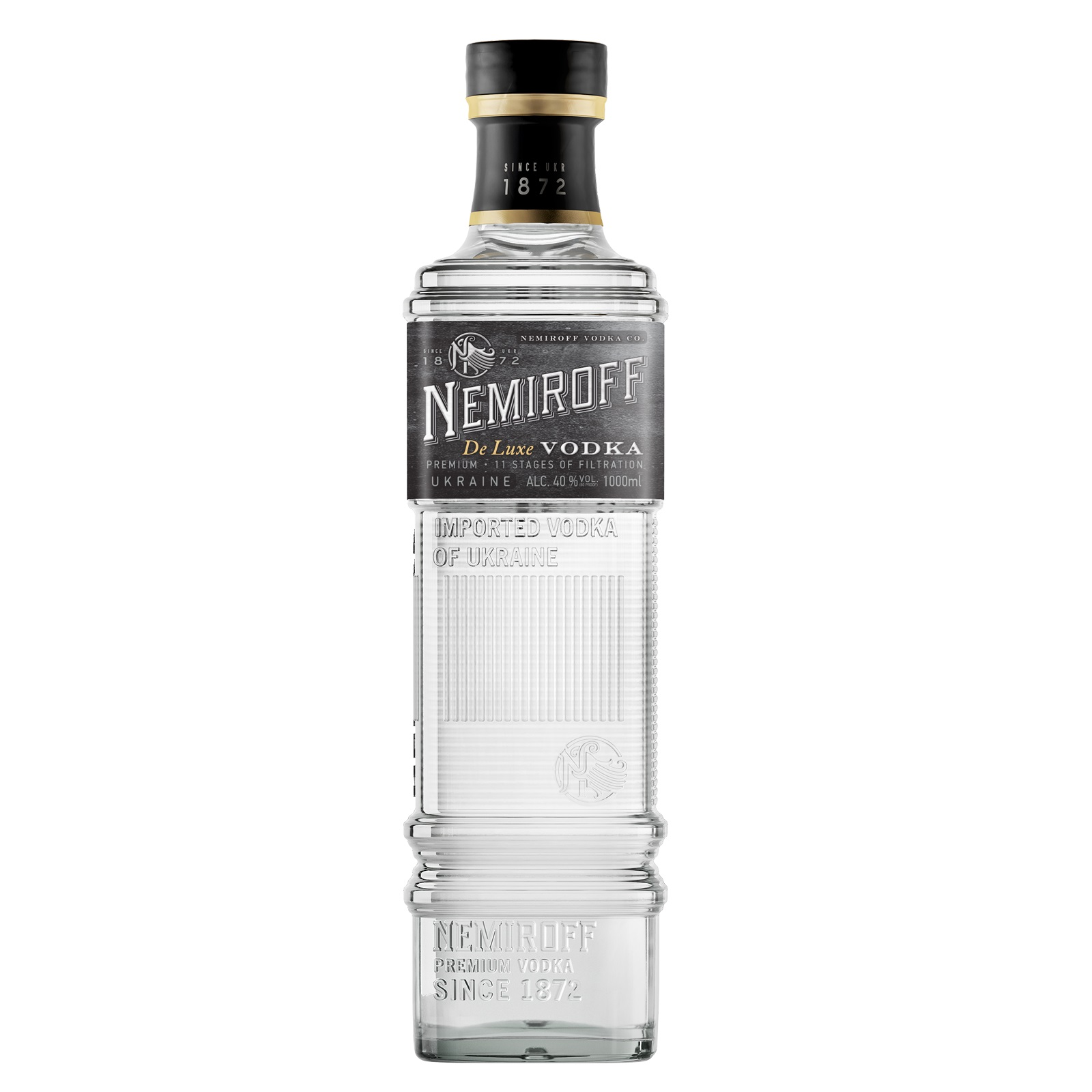
Nemiroff De Luxe

In 2018, the company conducted a large-scale rebranding with a focus on the premium market segment. The bottle acquired a smoothed square shape and a stylized wing appeared on the logo as a symbol of the Indomitable spirit.

In 2020, Coca-Cola became the official distributor of Nemiroff vodka in Poland. That year, Nemiroff was the first private company in Ukraine which bought the Nemyriv alcohol distillery after a state monopoly. Currently, the new distillery is under reconstruction.

In July 2021, Nemiroff extended its partnership with Coca-Cola HBC, which is now the brand’s exclusive distributor in the Czech Republic, Moldova, and Slovakia. In August of that year, Nemiroff entered the British market, distributed by Oak & Still. To celebrate the expansion, Nemiroff partnered with Bloodstock Open Air, making the drink available at the festival's bar.

In March 2022, in the wake of the Russian invasion of Ukraine, Nemiroff canceled the license for its vodka production in Russia and Belarus. In April 2022, Nemiroff launched in The Bahamas. Later in September 2022, Nemiroff signed a distribution deal with spirits importer Disaronno International to sell in Belgium, the Netherlands, and Luxembourg, with an aim to strengthen the brand’s distribution and awareness in Europe.

== Products ==
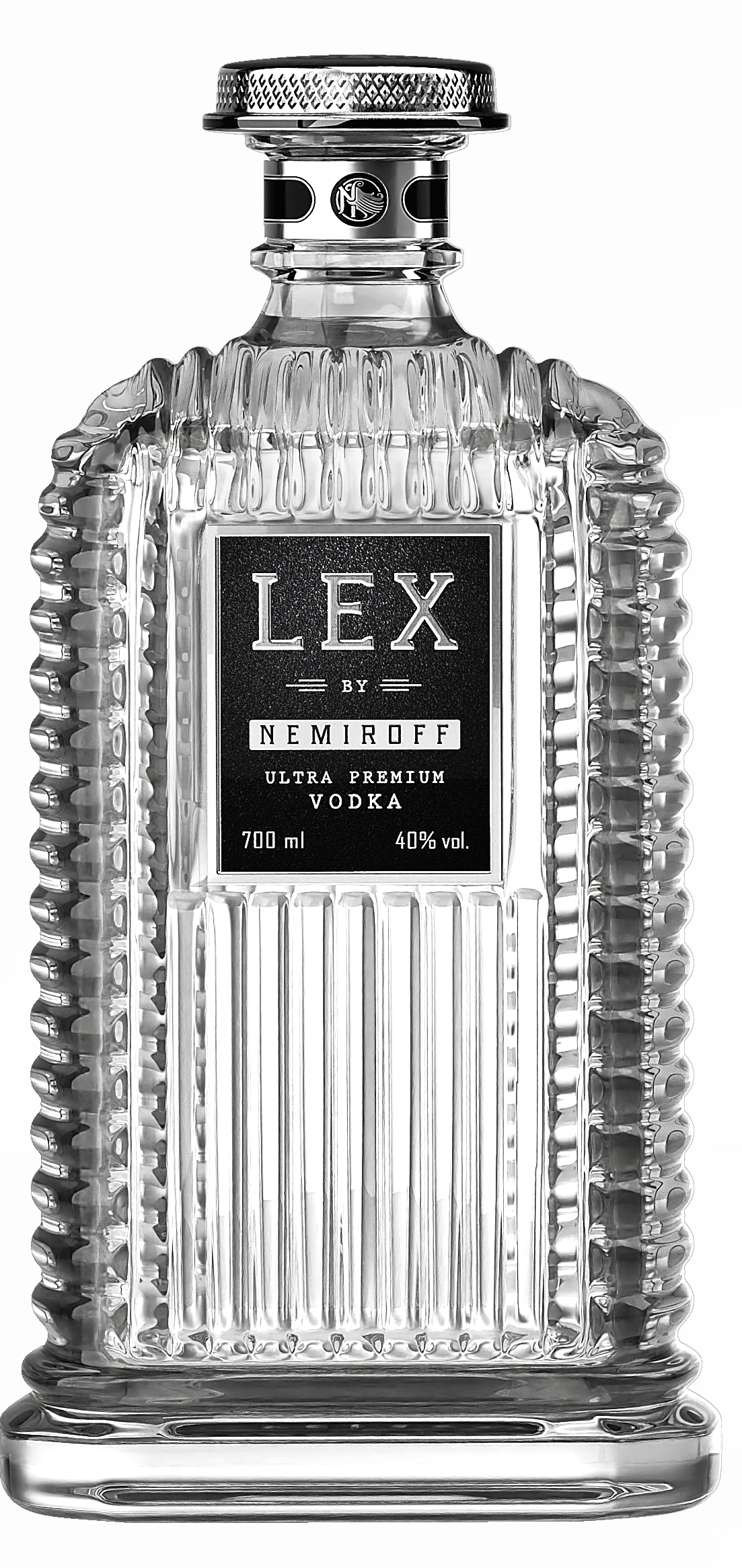
LEX by Nemiroff

The Nemiroff product line includes more than 60 types of classic and flavor products in various price categories, including the most popular being Ukrainian Honey with Pepper and ultra-premium LEX by Nemiroff.

In 2016, the company presented an updated premium line, Premium De Luxe.

At the end of 2019, a new line of taste vodka, The Inked Collection ("Bold Orange", "Wild Cranberry", "Burning Pear"), was released.

In 2022, Nemiroff released a new limited edition expression, with 100% of proceeds from its sale donated to those affected by the war in Ukraine. The Nemiroff Premium De Luxe came with a label featuring the colours of the Ukrainian flag.

In September 2023, Nemiroff launched "LEX by Nemiroff," an ultra-premium vodka crafted with wheat from the Podilia region, filtered through 13 stages, including silver, platinum, and amber.

In September 2024, Nemiroff announced the relaunch of its De Luxe RESERVE vodka at the TFWA World Exhibition in Cannes. This premium vodka undergoes an 11-step filtration process and incorporates contact with oak wood.

== Production process ==
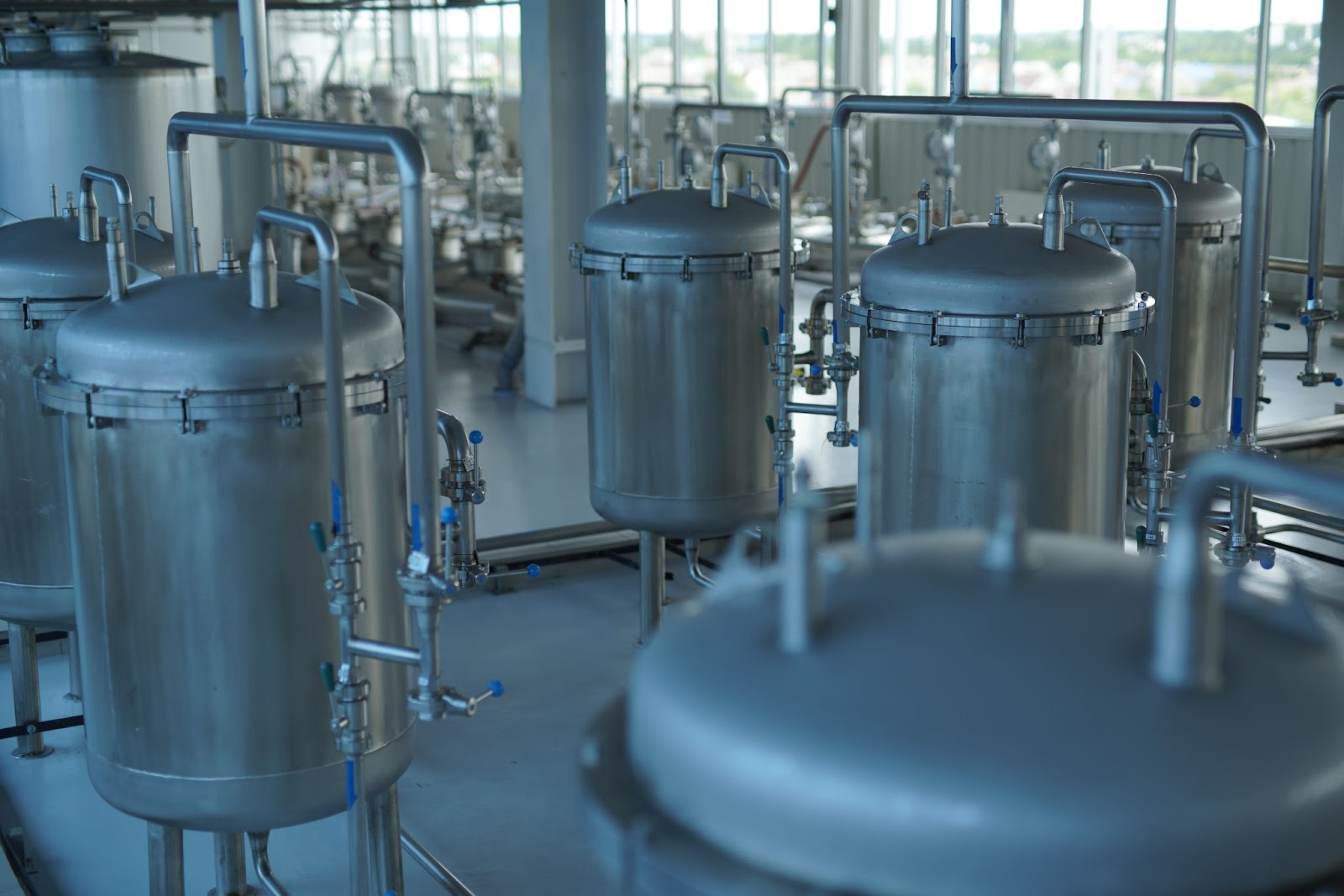
Modern production

Nemiroff Vodka products are made from grain alcohol made in the process of rectification, which has light neutral organoleptic due to the minimum amount of micro impurities of the feedstock, with the addition of aromatic additives from natural raw materials.

Nemiroff The Originals passes 9 stages of filtration. Nemiroff De Luxe and Nemiroff The Inked Collection have two additional stages named sophisticated filtration by silver and platinum.

Nemiroff uses only 100% natural ingredients & aromatics as honey, fresh herbs and botanicals. Also, Nemiroff uses hand craft infusions and locally squeezed juice.

For the Infused vodkas herbs, dried fruits & spices are poured into 50% water-alcohol mix and kept until an Infusion extract is ready. Then they are distilled and filtered and mixed with vodka. Infusions have the color, taste, and aroma of primary products.

Process of the aroma spirits production for flavored vodkas is similar to perfumery. Nemiroff uses copper alembics stills. The distiller can take different parts of aroma to achieve needed result. For delicate aroma it should be head fraction of distillation, for bold and deep aroma – the heart, tail fraction is used to achieve just a hint. Aromas do not have a color, they are intense in aroma but not in flavor.

The natural honey from the local apiaries is added to Nemiroff products for smooth taste.

For some products, as Nemiroff Rested in Barrel, the vodka rests in oak barrels to provide the aroma, taste, and harmony.

== Global partnerships ==
Bottles of Nemiroff vodka were shown in Lady Gaga's 2009 single Bad Romance.

In 2018, Nemiroff signed a strategic partnership with the Ultimate Fighting Championship and became the UFC Official Vodka Partner.

In 2021, Nemiroff was named an official partner of robotics technology firm Spacebit for a planned 2022 lunar mission. The mission was developed in partnership with the United Launch Alliance and Astrobotic Technology.

In November 2024, Nemiroff became the official vodka partner of Aston Villa Football Club from the English Premier League. At the same time, the brand announced a multi-year partnership with West Ham United Football Club, becoming the club's Official Vodka Partner. Also, Nemiroff signed multi-year partnership with Everton Football Club. On 28th of November, Fulham Football Club partnered with Nemiroff, a global vodka brand, as its first-ever Official Vodka Partner.

== Social responsibility ==
The company's social projects are aimed both at ecology, sports and culture.

Nemiroff finances music and film festivals, exhibitions, sporting events.

In 2005, Nemiroff became an international sponsor of Eurovision. The following year it funded the Nemiroff Yalta Rally European Cup.

In 2009, the company launched the Green Planet project to implement electronic document management and resource saving measures, which saved more than 7 tons of paper per year. The same year, the brand became a partner of the Ukrainian Pavilion at the 53rd Venice Biennale.

In total, during 2010-2011, the company spent ₴19 million to finance social projects.

In 2021, Nemiroff converted almost all personnel, accountancy, and reporting documents to electronic form, including contracts with partners.

In the Nemiroff The Originals line, the brand started using a completely new type of eco-caps. They were developed specifically for a Ukrainian company without the use of polycarbonate and bisphenol-A, which is now forbidden in many countries. Nemiroff was one of the first in the world to use them.

== Awards and recognitions ==
In 2010, the Nemiroff brand with an estimate of $404 million took first place among the TOP-100 Ukrainian brands.

Between 2004 and 2020, the Nemiroff brand received more than 70 international awards, including awards from the Chicago Beverage Tasting Institute, The Vodka Masters, San Francisco World Spirits Competition, The Superior Taste Awards, International Spirits Challenge, Mixology Taste Forum, World Drinks Award, The Global Spirits Masters International Competition, Wine Enthusiast, The London Spirits Competition, The Fifty Best, and John Barleycorn.

In 2020, Nemiroff entered the ranking of the top 25 Ukrainian brands. In 2021, Nemiroff received the status "Vodka Brand Champion" and earned the title of the vodka brand №1 in the world by the leading industry media The Spirits Business. As of 2021, Nemiroff is listed as #1 in the world’s TOP fastest-growing spirits brands. That year, Nemiroff The Inked Collection Burning Pear was recognized as The World’s Best Vodka at The Spirits Masters competition and received the "Taste Master" medal.

In 2024, Nemiroff was named Vodka Brand Champion 2024 at The Spirits Masters competition.
