= Hrenovuha =

Strong vodka traditional in Russia, Ukraine and Belarus

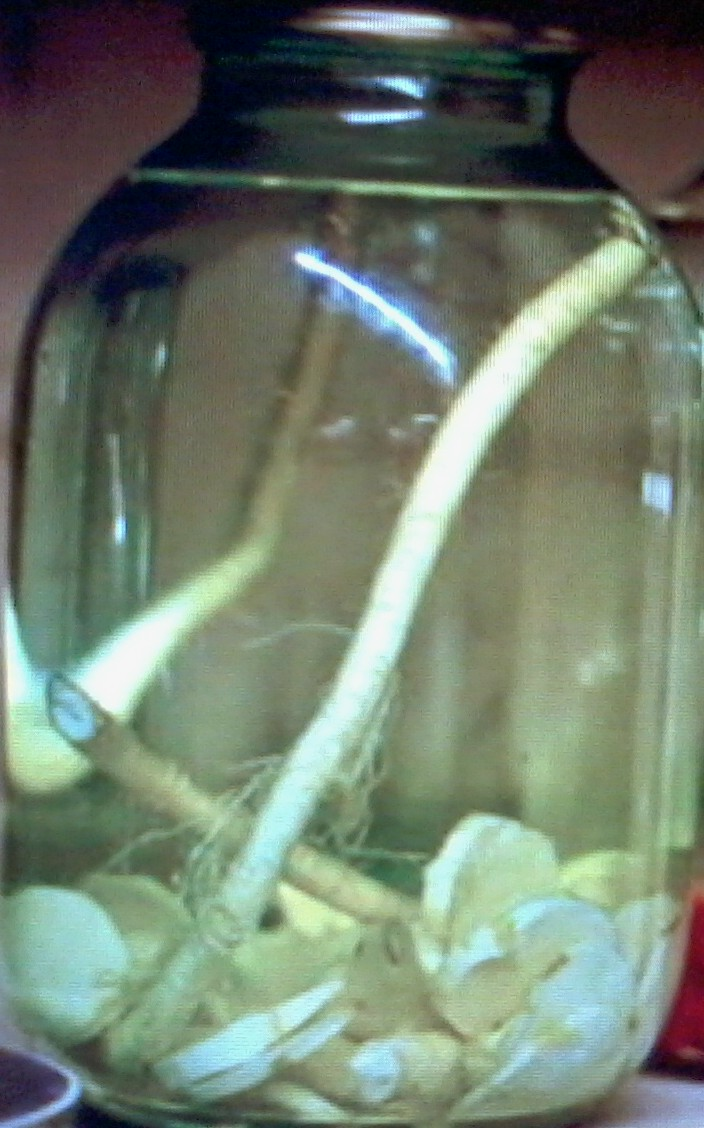
A jar of hrenovuha

Hrenovuha (Ukrainian: хріновуха, romanized: khrinovukha, Russian: хреновуха, romanized: khrenovukha) is a type of strong vodka, traditional in Russia, Ukraine and Belarus. It has a bitter taste, being made from horseradish root, often with different spices, such as peppercorns or garlic. Hrenovuha can be easily prepared at home.

This practice is an ancient tradition. At the beginning of the 18th century, a decree was issued that every farmstead must produce vodka. The word "hrenovuha" refers to the common parlance and is not recorded in dictionaries. Nevertheless, horseradish alcohol is served under this name in many restaurants. The Moscow plant KIN1 produces this beverage.
