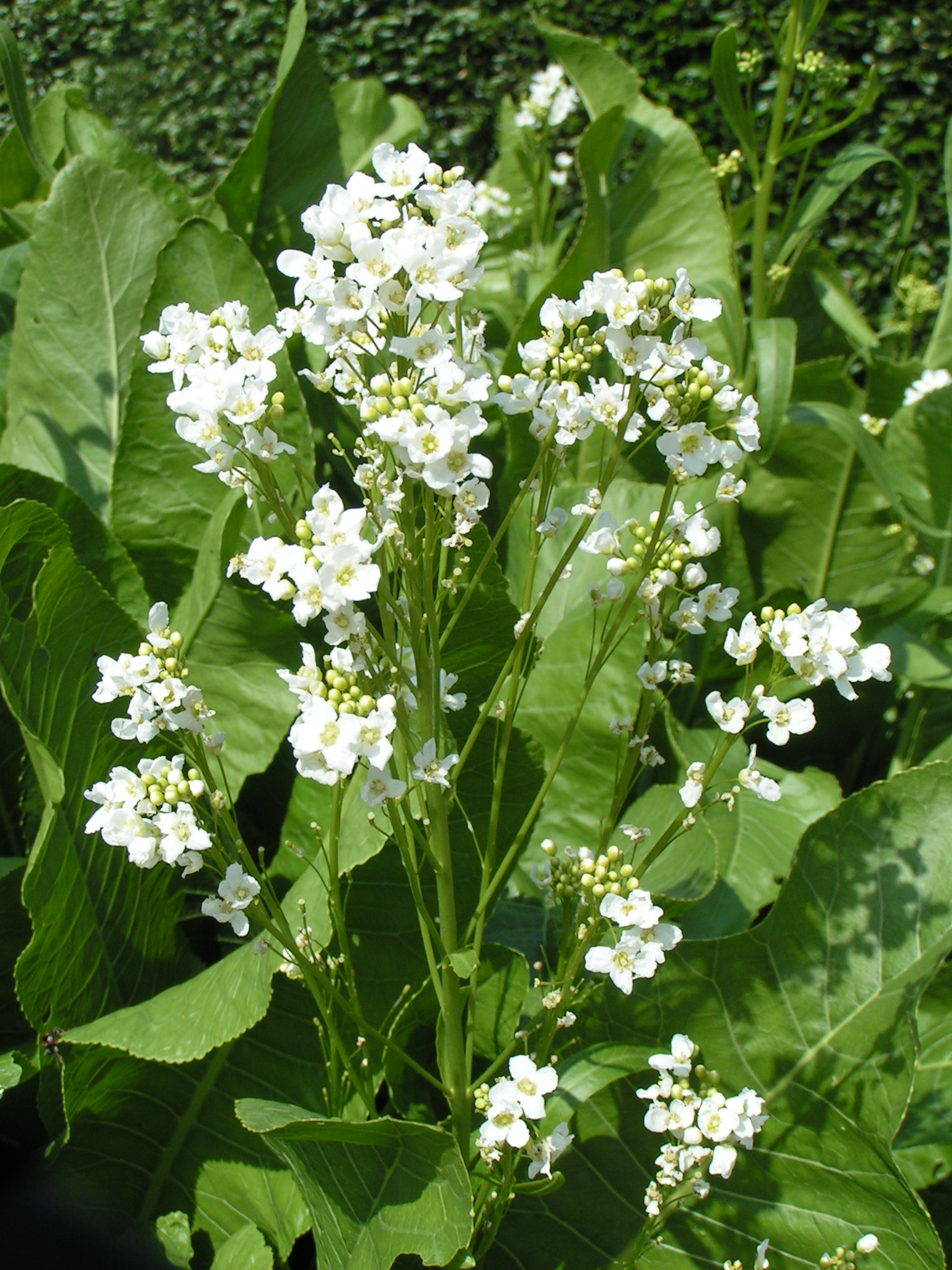

Conservation status
- Least Concern (IUCN 3.1)

Scientific classification
- Kingdom: Plantae
- Clade: Tracheophytes
- Clade: Angiosperms
- Clade: Eudicots
- Clade: Rosids
- Order: Brassicales
- Family: Brassicaceae
- Genus: Armoracia
- Species: A. rusticana

Binomial name
- Armoracia rusticana G.Gaertn., B.Mey. & Scherb.

Synonyms
- Synonymy: Armoracia armoracia Cockerell ex Daniels; Armoracia lapathifolia Gilib.; Armoracia rustica Schur; Armoracia sativa Bernh.; Cardamine armoracia (L.) Kuntze; Cochlearia armoracia L.; Cochlearia lancifolia Stokes; Cochlearia lapathifolia Gilib.; Cochlearia rusticana Lam.; Cochlearia variifolia Salisb.; Crucifera armoracia E.H.L.Krause; Nasturtium armoracia (L.) Fr.; Raphanis magna Moench; Raphanus rusticanus Garsault; Rorippa armoracia (L.) Hitchc.; Rorippa rusticana (G. Gaertn., B. Mey. & Scherb.) Godr.

= Horseradish =

Species of flowering plant

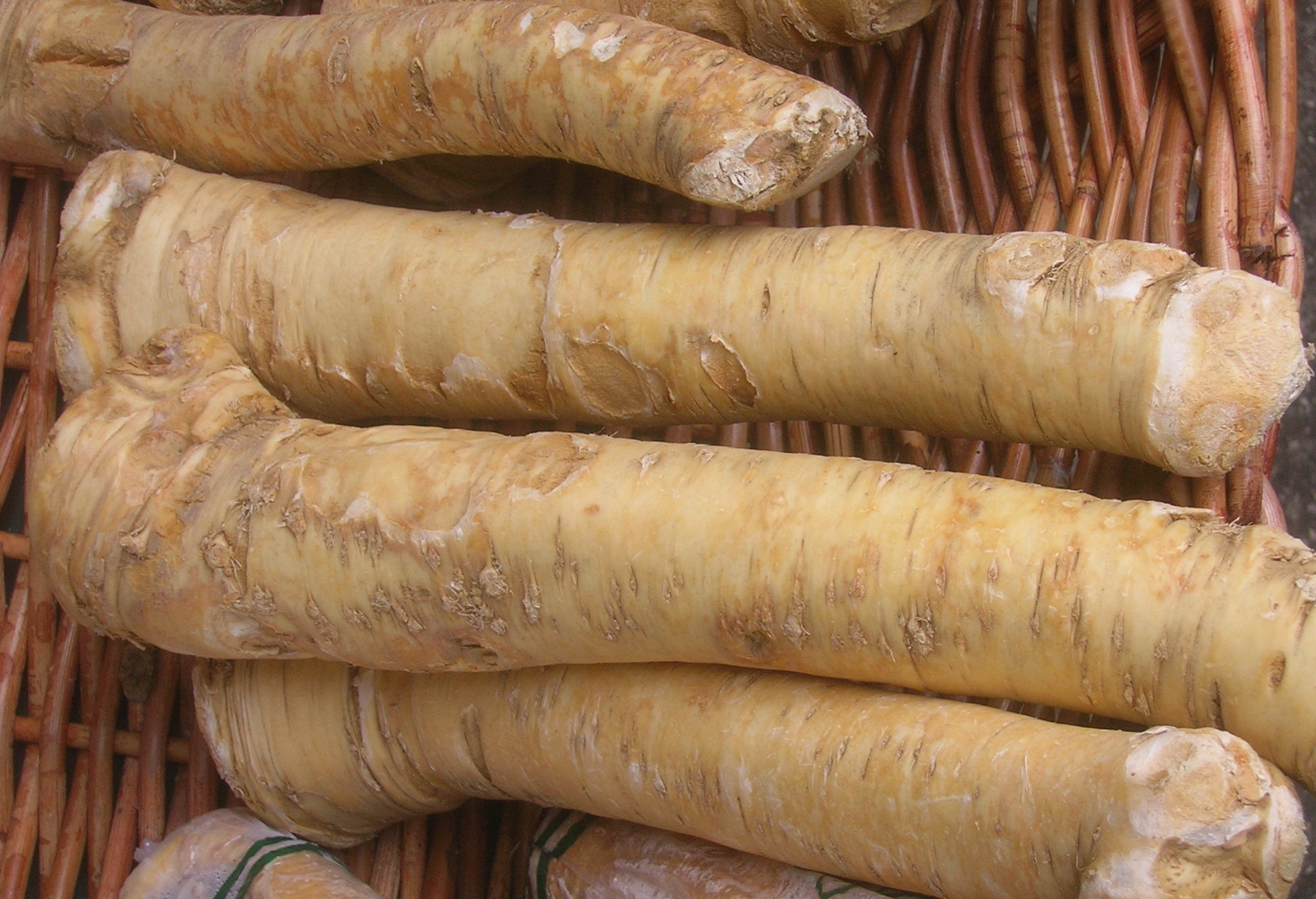
Sections of roots of the horseradish plant

Horseradish (Armoracia rusticana, syn. Cochlearia armoracia) is a perennial plant of the family Brassicaceae (which also includes mustard, wasabi, broccoli, cabbage, and radish). It is a root vegetable, cultivated and used worldwide as a spice and as a condiment. The species is likely native to Southeastern Europe and Western Asia.

== Description ==
Foliage

Horseradish grows up to 1.5 meters (5 feet) tall, with hairless bright green unlobed leaves up to 1 m (3 ft 3 in) long that may be mistaken for docks (Rumex). It is cultivated primarily for its large, white, tapered root. The white four-petalled flowers are scented and are borne in dense panicles. Established plants may form extensive patches and may become invasive unless carefully managed.

Intact horseradish root has little aroma. When cut or grated, enzymes from within the plant cells digest sinigrin (a glucosinolate) to produce allyl isothiocyanate (mustard oil), which irritates the mucous membranes of the sinuses and eyes. Once exposed to air or heat, horseradish loses its pungency, darkens in color, and develops a bitter flavor.

== History ==
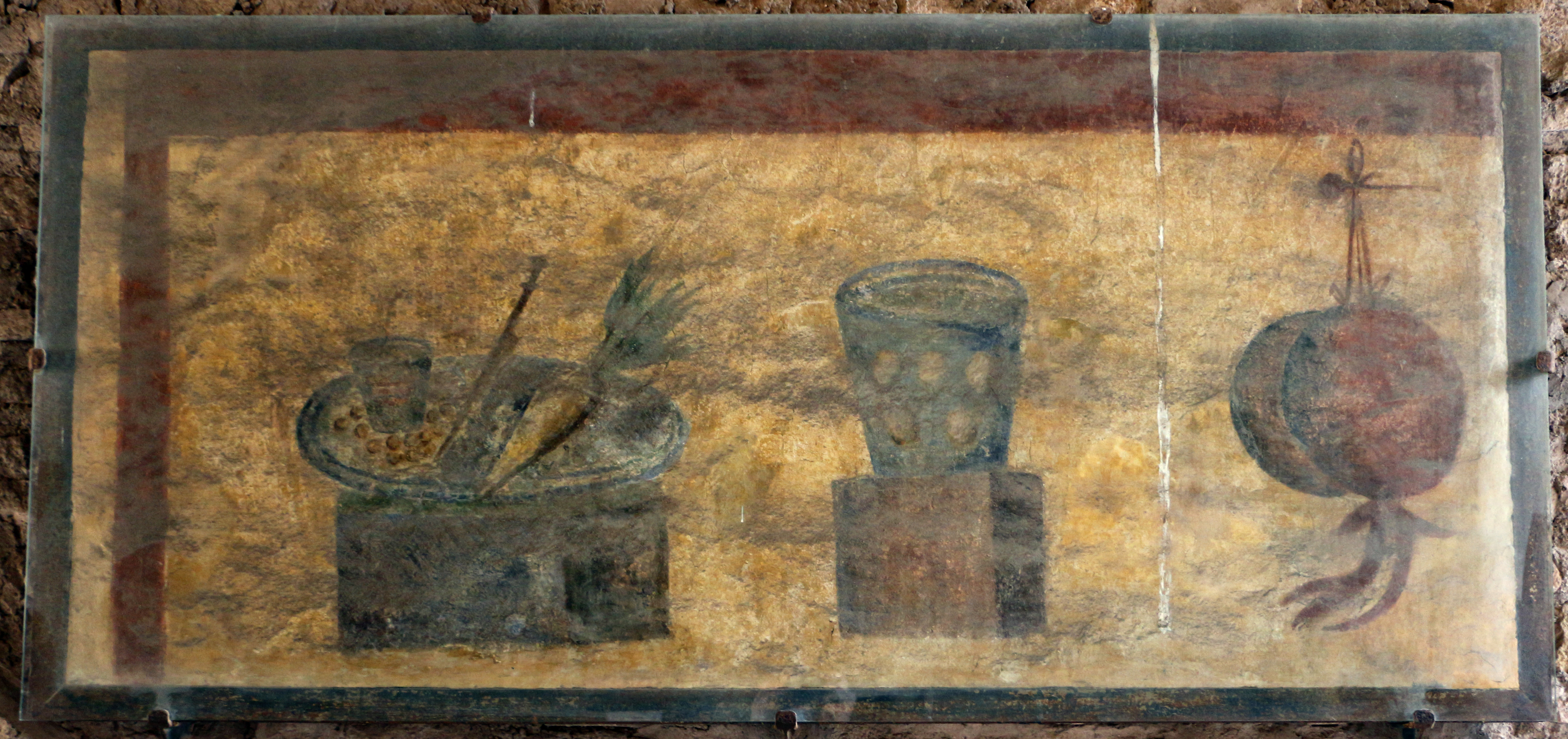
Fresco containing a possible horseradish from Ostia Antica

Horseradish has been cultivated since antiquity. Dioscorides listed horseradish equally as Persicon sinapi (Diosc. 2.186) or Sinapi persicum (Diosc. 2.168), which Pliny's Natural History reported as Persicon napy; Cato discusses the plant in his treatises on agriculture. A mural in Ostia Antica shows the plant. Horseradish is probably the plant mentioned by Pliny the Elder in his Natural History under the name of Amoracia, and recommended by him for its medicinal qualities, and possibly the wild radish, or raphanos agrios of the Greeks. The early Renaissance herbalists Pietro Andrea Mattioli and John Gerard showed it under Raphanus. Its modern Linnaean genus Armoracia was first applied to it by Heinrich Bernhard Ruppius, in his Flora Jenensis, 1745, but Linnaeus himself called it Cochlearia armoracia.

Both roots and leaves were used as a traditional medicine during the Middle Ages. The root was used as a condiment on meats in Germany, Scandinavia, and Britain. It was introduced to North America during European colonization; both George Washington and Thomas Jefferson mention horseradish in garden accounts. Native Americans used it to stimulate the glands, stave off scurvy, and as a diaphoretic treatment for the common cold.

William Turner mentions horseradish as Red Cole in his "Herbal" (1551–1568), but not as a condiment. In The Herball, or Generall Historie of Plantes (1597), John Gerard describes it under the name of raphanus rusticanus, stating that it occurs wild in several parts of England. After referring to its medicinal uses, he says:

[T]he Horse Radish stamped with a little vinegar put thereto, is commonly used among the Germans for sauce to eat fish with and such like meats as we do mustard.

== Etymology and common names ==
The word horseradish is attested in English from the 1590s. It combines the word horse (formerly used in a figurative sense to mean strong or coarse, as with archaic horsepistol and horselock) and the word radish. Some sources say that the term originates from a mispronunciation of the German word "meerrettich" as "mareradish". However, this hypothesis has been disputed, as there is no historical evidence of this term being used.

== Cultivation ==
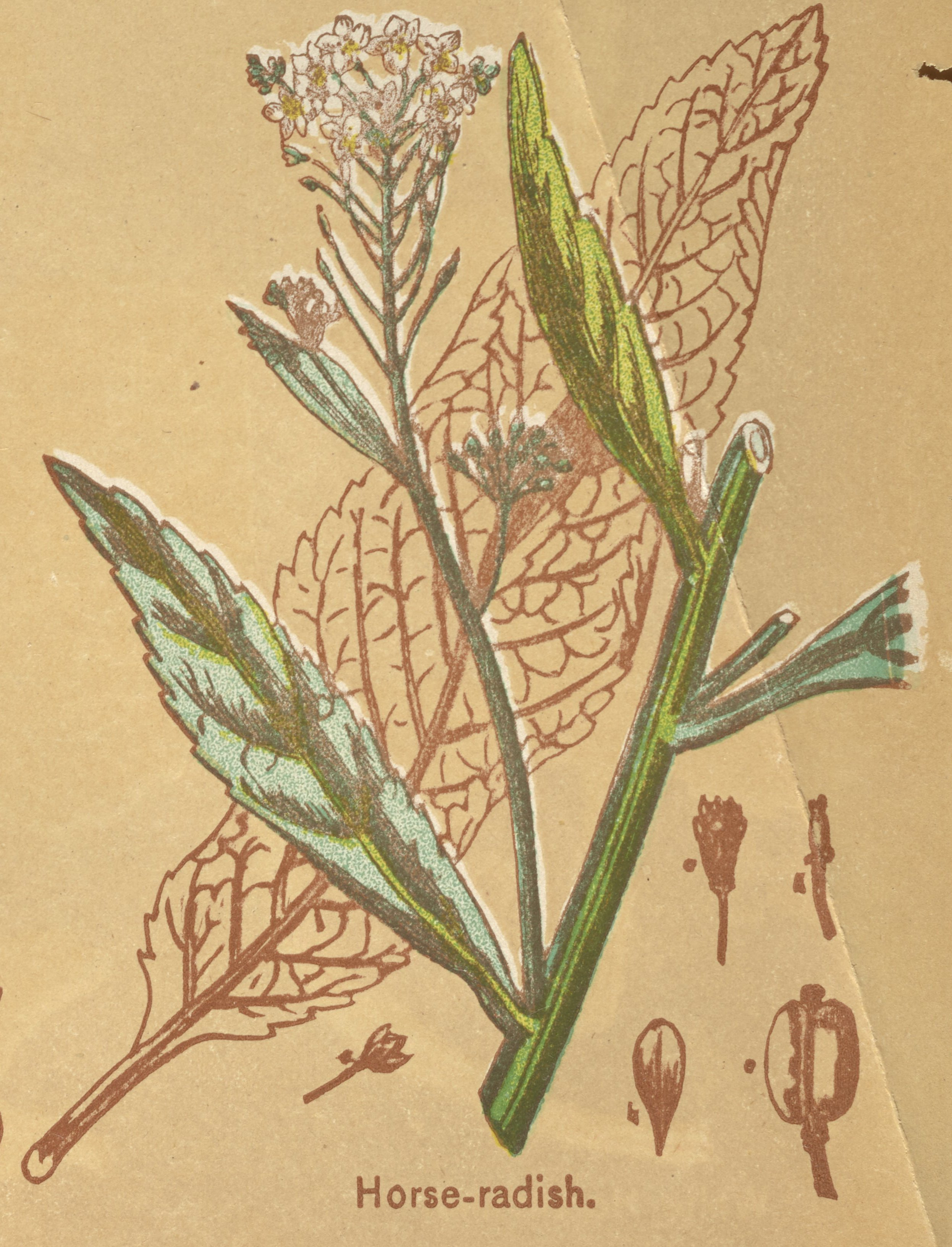
Horseradish, from The Book of Health, 1898, by Henry Munson Lyman

Horseradish is perennial in hardiness zones 2–9 and can be grown as an annual in other zones, although not as successfully as in zones with both a long growing season and winter temperatures cold enough to ensure plant dormancy. After the first frost in autumn kills the leaves, the root is dug and divided. The main root is harvested and one or more large offshoots of the main root are replanted to produce next year's crop. Horseradish left undisturbed in the garden spreads via underground shoots and can become invasive. Older roots left in the ground become woody, after which they are no longer culinarily useful, although older plants can be dug and re-divided to start new plants. The early season leaves can be distinctively different, asymmetric spiky before the mature typical flat broad leaves start to be developed.

=== Pests and diseases ===
Introduced by accident, "cabbageworms", the larvae of Pieris rapae, are a common caterpillar pest in horseradish. Mature caterpillars chew large, ragged holes in the leaves leaving the large veins intact. Handpicking is an effective control strategy in home gardens. Another common pest of horseradish is the mustard leaf beetle (Phaedon cochleariae). These beetles are undeterred by the defense mechanisms produced by Brassicaceae plants like horseradish.

== Production ==
In the United States, horseradish is grown in several areas, such as Eau Claire, Wisconsin, and Tule Lake, California. The most concentrated growth occurs in the Collinsville, Illinois, region.

Thirty thousand metric tonnes of horseradish are produced in Europe annually, of which Hungary produces 12,000, making it the biggest single producer.

== Culinary uses ==
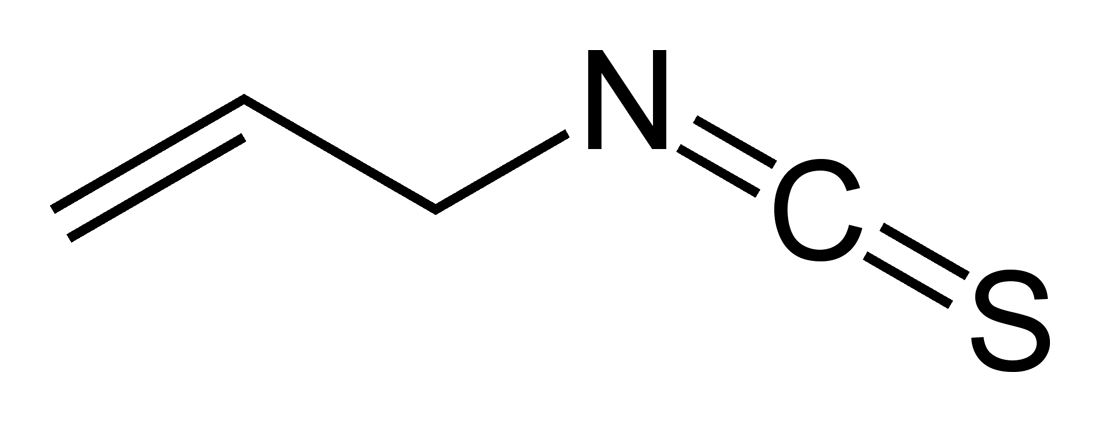
Allyl isothiocyanate is the pungent ingredient in fresh horseradish sauce.

The distinctive pungent taste of horseradish is from the compound allyl isothiocyanate. Upon crushing the flesh of horseradish, the enzyme myrosinase is released and acts on the glucosinolates sinigrin and gluconasturtiin, which are precursors to the allyl isothiocyanate. The allyl isothiocyanate serves the plant as a natural defense against herbivores. Since allyl isothiocyanate hurts the plant, it is stored in the harmless form of glucosinolate, separate from the enzyme myrosinase. When an animal chews the plant, the allyl isothiocyanate is released, repelling the animal. Allyl isothiocyanate is an unstable compound, degrading over days at 37 °C (99 °F). Because of this instability, horseradish sauces lack the pungency of freshly crushed roots.

Cooks may use the terms "horseradish" or "prepared horseradish" to refer to the mashed (or grated) root of the horseradish plant mixed with vinegar. Prepared horseradish is white to creamy beige. It can be stored for up to 3 months under refrigeration, but eventually will darken, indicating less flavour. The leaves of the plant are edible as well, either cooked or raw when young, with a similar but less pronounced flavor.

On Passover, many Ashkenazi Jews use grated horseradish as a choice for Maror (bitter herbs) at the Passover Seder.

=== Horseradish sauce ===
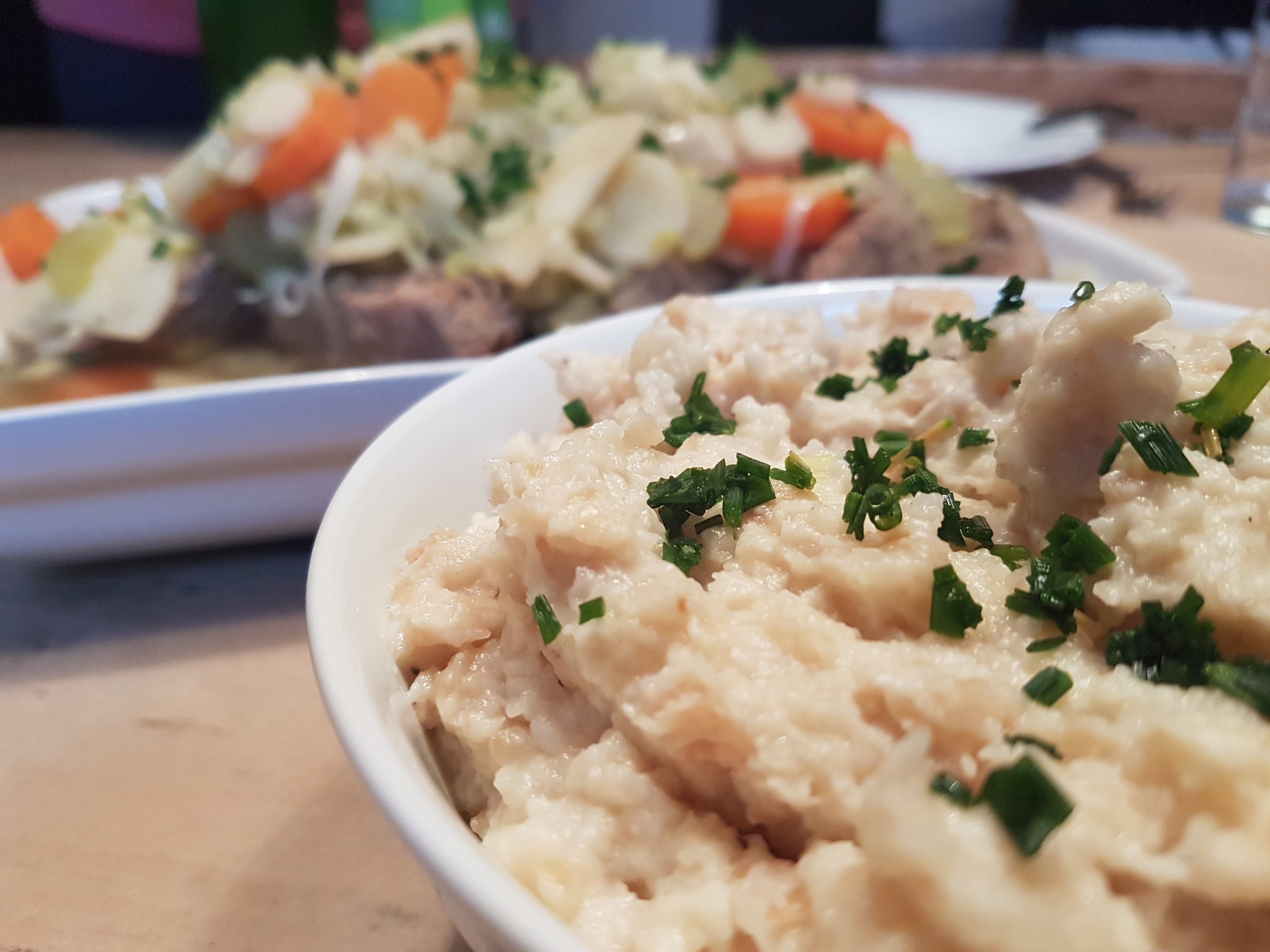
A dish of horseradish served with a meal

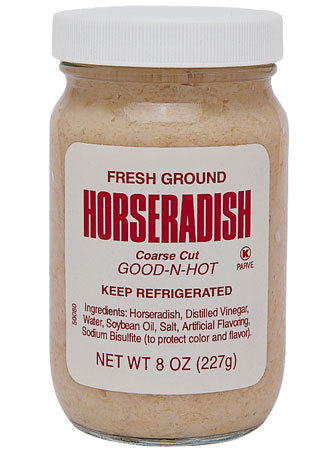
A jar of prepared horseradish

Horseradish sauce, a spicy paste made from grated horseradish root, is a common condiment in Europe. It is made with vinegar and found in the United Kingdom, in Denmark (with sugar added), in Poland, It is a common condiment for meat and fish dishes in Eastern and Central European cuisines (Slovene, northern Croatian, Belarusian, Czech, Slovak, German (especially Bavarian), Polish, Romanian, Latvian, Lithuanian, Russian, Ukrainian. (Note: Czech: křen Slovak: chren German: Meerrettich or Kren Polish: chrzan Romanian: hrean Serbian: хрен, hren Russian: хрен, romanized: khren Ukrainian: хрiн, romanized: khrin)

In the UK, it is usually served with roast beef, often as part of a traditional Sunday roast, but can be used in a number of other dishes, including sandwiches or salads. A variation of horseradish sauce, which in some cases may replace the vinegar with other products like lemon juice or citric acid, is known in Germany as Tafelmeerrettich. Also available in the UK is Tewkesbury mustard, a blend of mustard and grated horseradish originating in medieval times and mentioned by Shakespeare (Falstaff says: "his wit's as thick as Tewkesbury Mustard" in Henry IV Part II). A similar mustard, called Krensenf or Meerrettichsenf, is common in Austria and parts of Germany. In France, sauce au raifort is used in Alsatian cuisine. In Russia, horseradish root is usually mixed with grated garlic and a small amount of tomatoes for color (Khrenovina sauce).

In the United States, the term "horseradish sauce" refers to grated horseradish combined with mayonnaise or salad dressing. In Denmark, it is mixed with whipping cream and as such used on top of traditional Danish open sandwiches with beef (boiled or steaked) slices. Prepared horseradish is a common ingredient in Bloody Mary cocktails and in cocktail sauce and is used as a sauce or sandwich spread. Horseradish cream is a mixture of horseradish and sour cream and is served au jus for a prime rib dinner.

Many Central European varieties include cream, while some Russian recipes call for khren with smetana (sour cream). There are also varieties including apples, lingonberry, cranberry and oranges. In Eastern and Central European cuisines, horseradish sauce is a typical condiment for various fish dishes, as well as for meat and fish zakuski, such as kholodets (aspic) and beef tongue.

Horseradish sauce is a part of Christian Easter traditions in Europe. It is eaten during Eastertide (Paschaltide) as "a reminder of the bitterness of Jesus' suffering" on Good Friday.

In parts of Southern Germany "kren" is a component of the traditional wedding dinner. It is served with cooked beef and a dip made from lingonberry to balance the slight hotness of the kren. In Poland, a variety with red beetroot is called ćwikła z chrzanem or simply ćwikła. In Russia, a very popular ingredient for pickles (cucumbers, tomatoes, mushrooms). In Transylvania and other Romanian regions, red beetroot with horseradish is used as a salad served with lamb dishes at Easter called sfecla cu hrean. In Serbia, ren is an essential condiment with cooked meat and freshly roasted suckling pig. In Croatia, freshly grated horseradish (hren) is often eaten with boiled ham or beef. In Hungary, Slovenia, and in the adjacent Italian regions of Friuli-Venezia Giulia and the nearby Italian region of Veneto, horseradish is often grated and mixed with sour cream, vinegar, hard-boiled eggs, or apples. In the Italian regions of Lombardy, Emilia-Romagna, and Piedmont, it is called barbaforte (strong beard) and is a traditional accompaniment to bollito misto; while in northeastern regions like Trentino-Alto Adige/Südtirol, Veneto and Friuli-Venezia Giulia, it is still called kren or cren. In the southern region of Basilicata it is known as rafano and used for the preparation of rafanata, a main course made of horseradish, eggs, cheese and sausage.

Horseradish is also used as a main ingredient for soups. In Poland, horseradish soup is a common Easter Day dish.

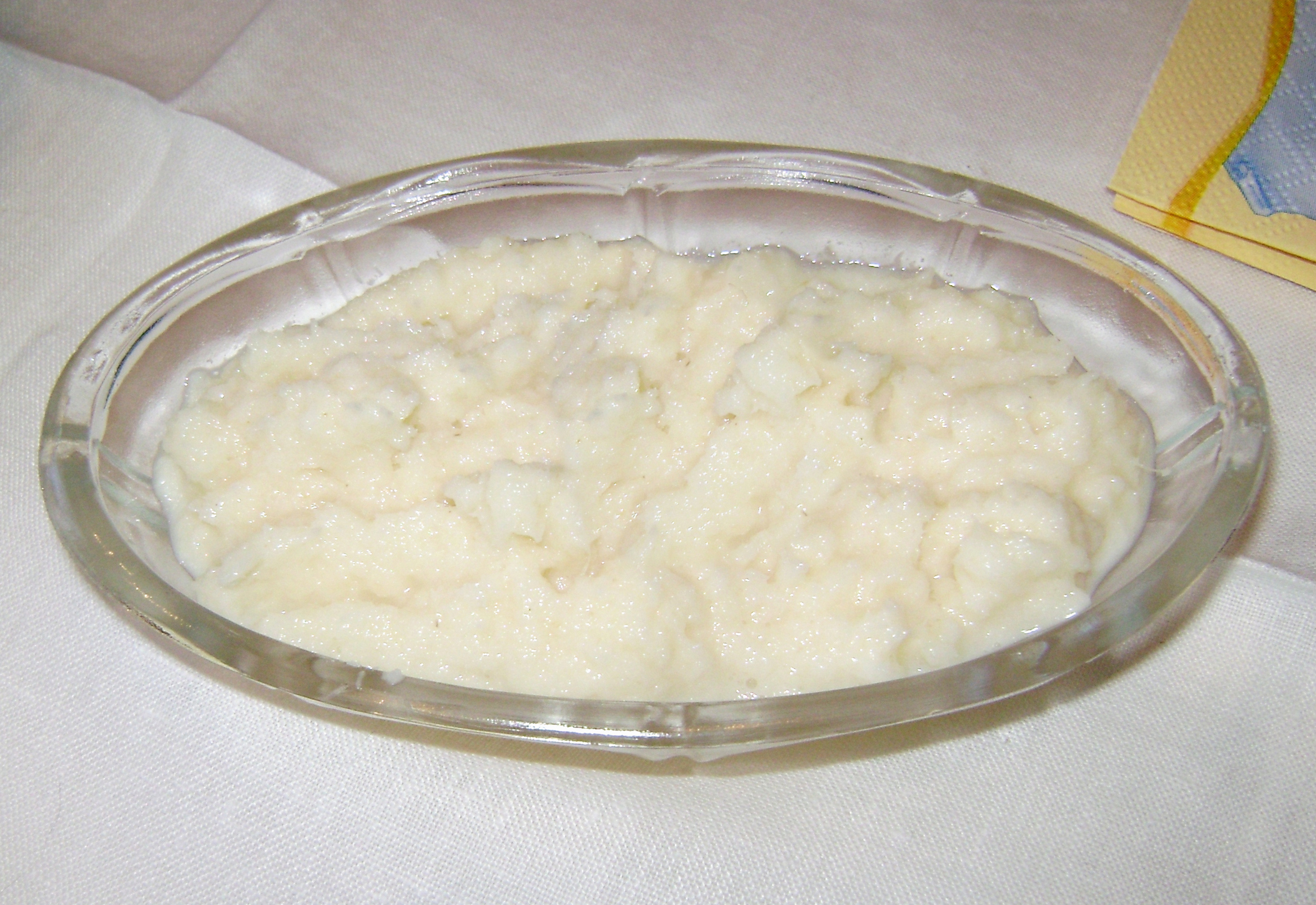
White horseradish sauce from a Polish Easter table

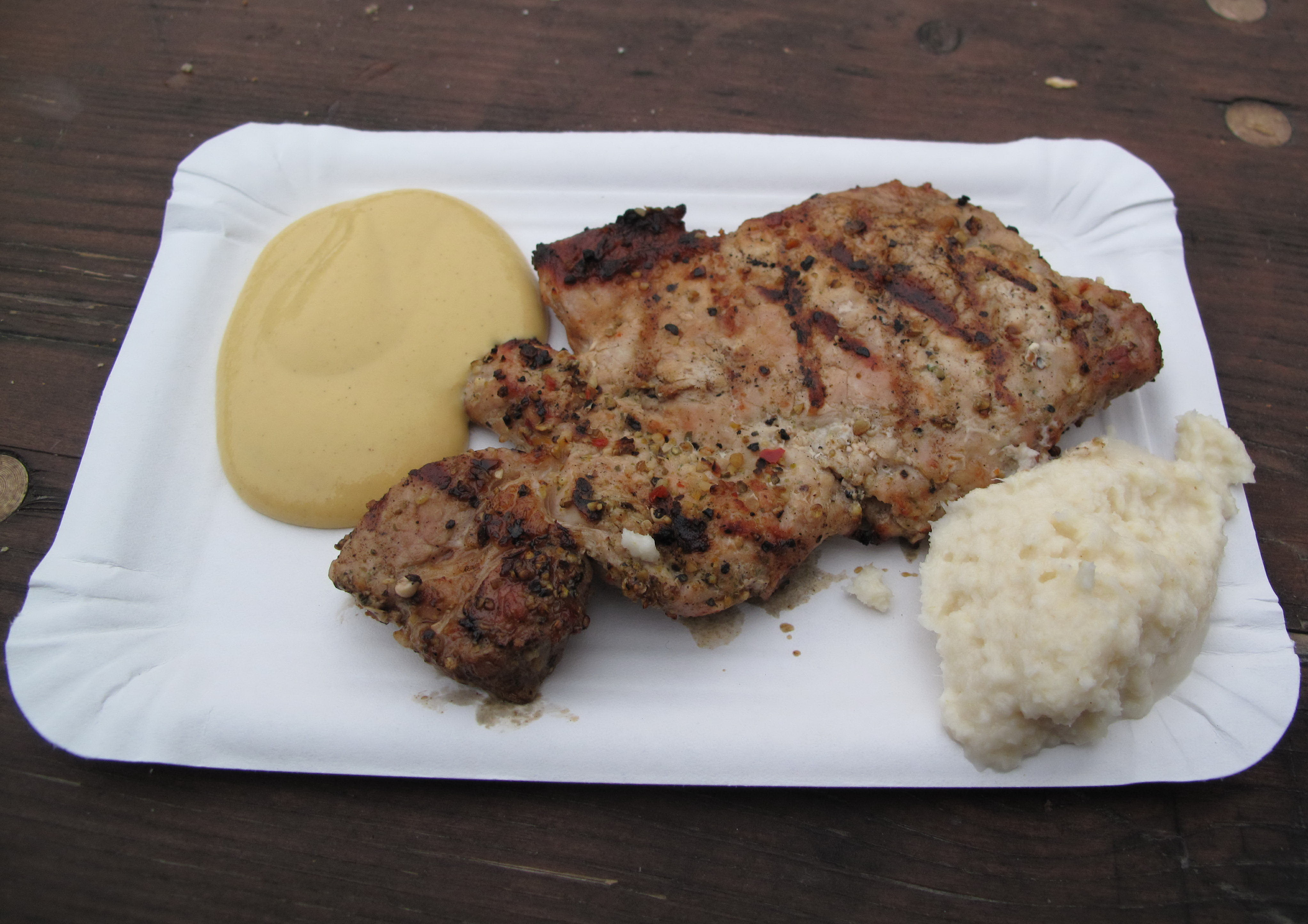
Meat with mustard (left) and white křen (right) from a Czech table

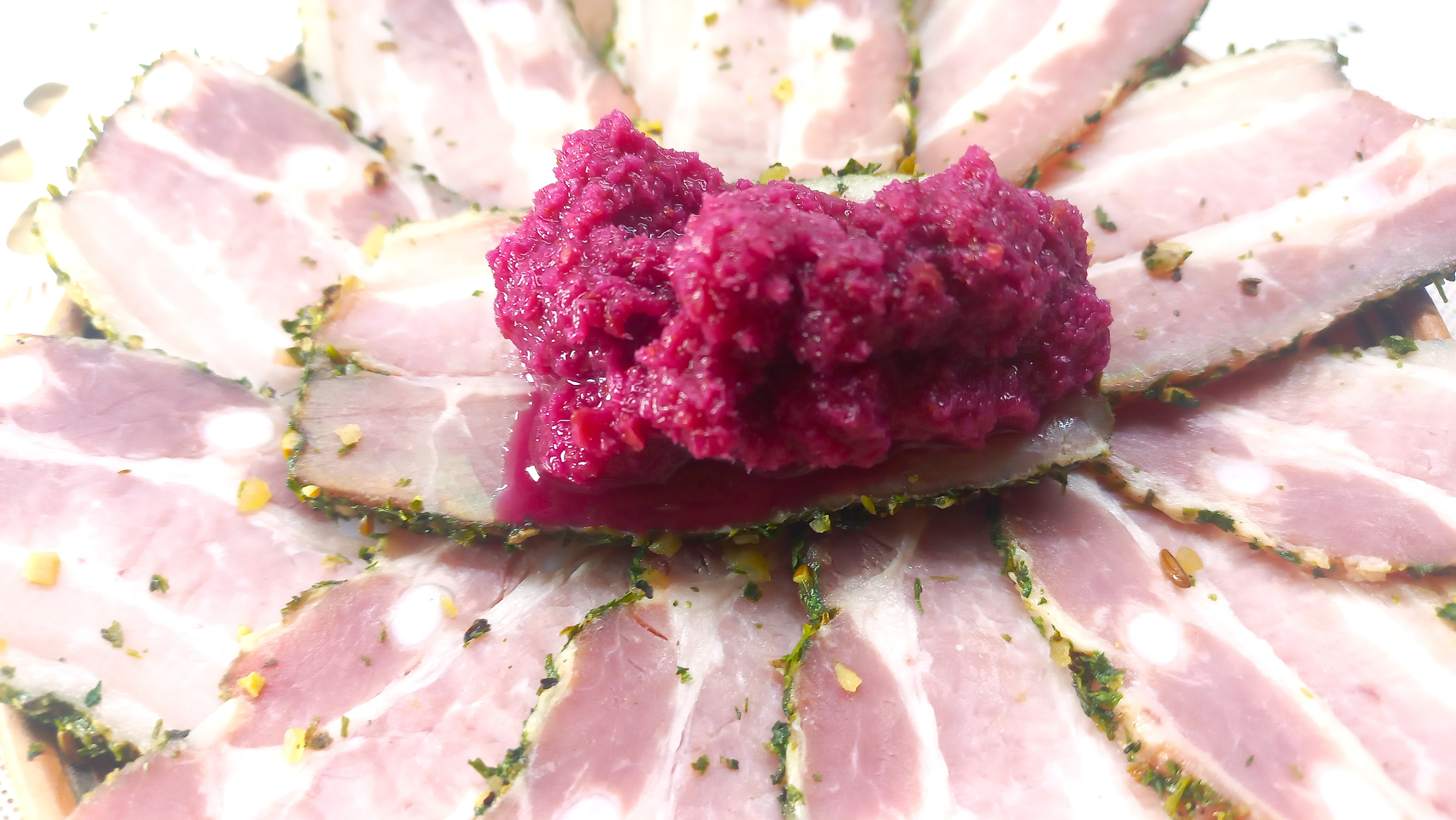
Smoked pork belly with spices and horseradish Chernihiv region Ukraine

==== Chrain ====
Chrain is the name for horseradish sauce in Ashkenazi Jewish cuisine. Chrain comes from Yiddish כריין, which is in turn a loanword from Slavic languages. (Note: Yiddish: כריין, romanized: khreyn Hebrew: חזרת, romanized: khazeret;)

There are two common forms of chrain in the Slavic and Ashkenazi Jewish cuisines. White chrain consists of grated horseradish and vinegar, and sometimes sugar and salt, while red chrain includes the addition of beetroot. These types of chrain are distinct from other horseradish-based condiments in that they are pareve (contain no dairy products), making it acceptable at both meat and dairy meals according to Jewish dietary law.

The use of chrain in Eastern and Central European Jewish communities is ancient, and is first attested in writing from the 12th century. Though it has had several historical uses, chrain is most commonly associated in modern times with gefilte fish, for which it is considered an essential condiment.

In Ashkenazi European Jewish cooking, beetroot horseradish is commonly served with gefilte fish.

Chrain is part of Jewish Passover tradition (as maror) in Eastern and Central Europe.

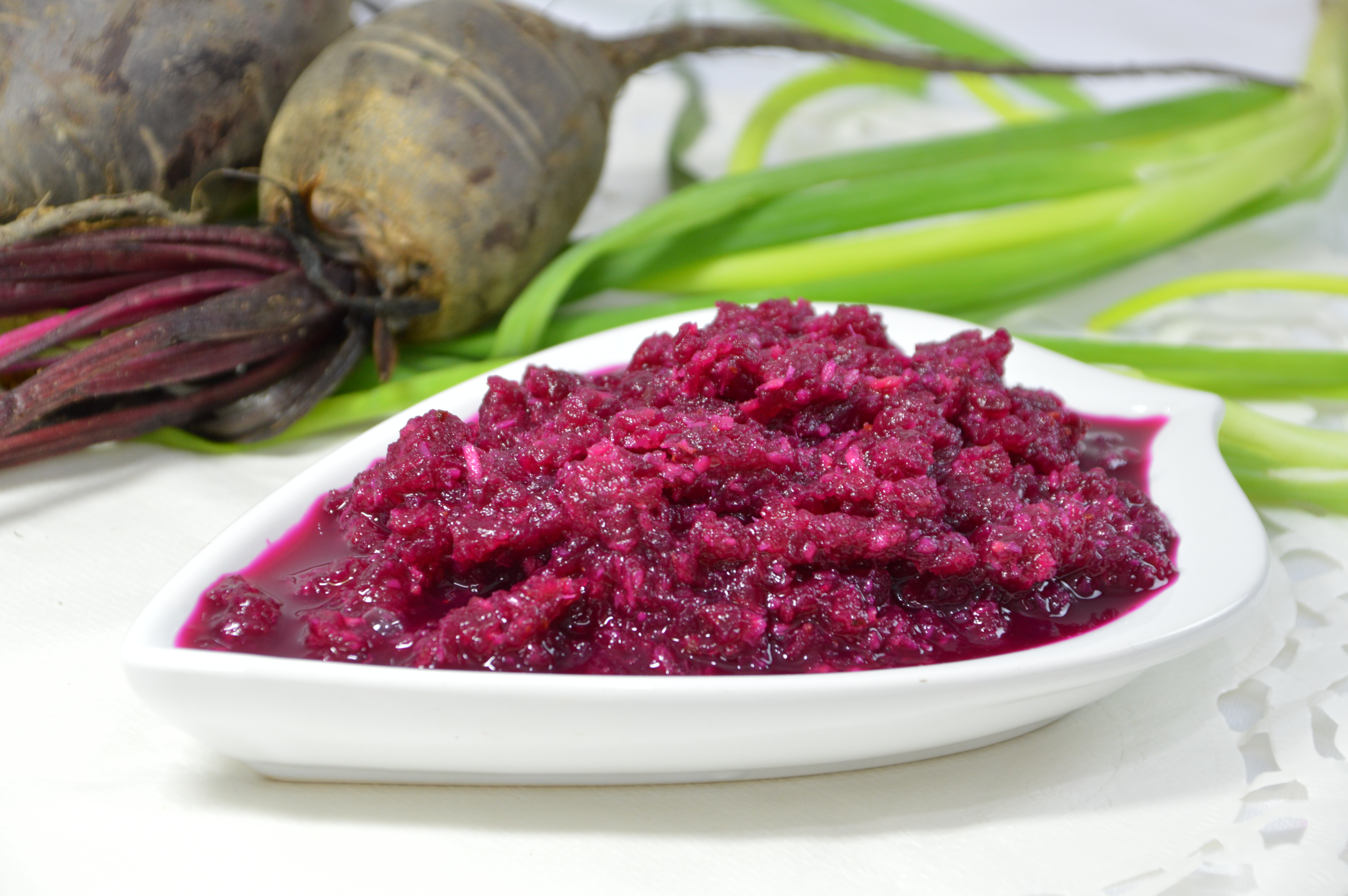
Beetroot horseradish

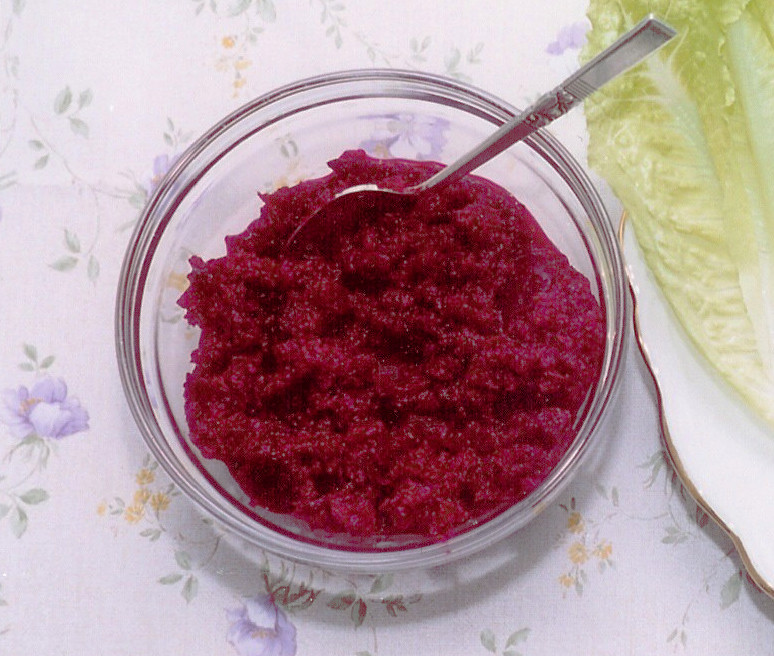
Red chrain

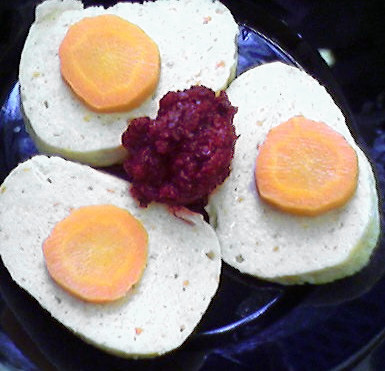
Gefilte fish with red chrain

=== Relation to wasabi ===
Outside Japan, the Japanese condiment wasabi, although traditionally prepared from the true wasabi plant (Wasabia japonica), is now usually made with horseradish due to the scarcity of the wasabi plant. The Japanese botanical name for horseradish is seiyōwasabi (セイヨウワサビ, 西洋山葵), or "Western wasabi". Both plants are members of the family Brassicaceae.

== Other uses ==
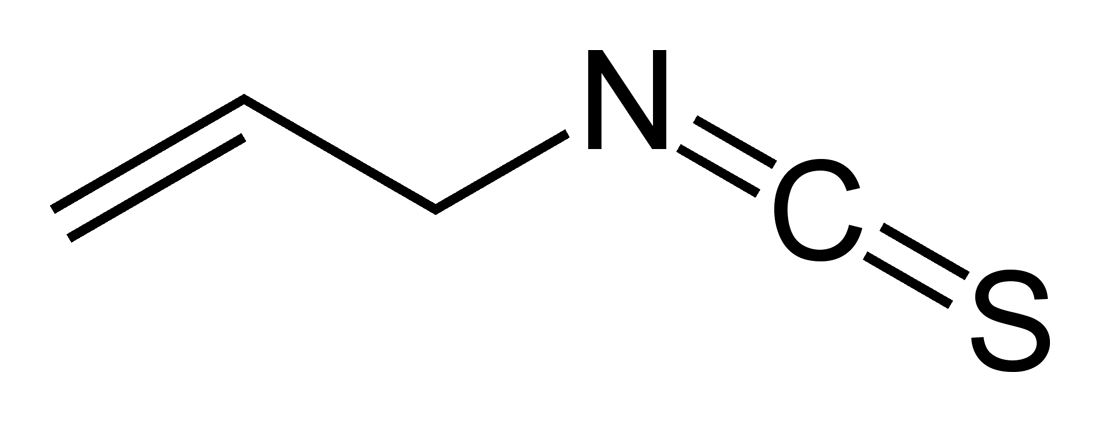
Allyl isothiocyanate is the pungent ingredient in fresh horseradish sauce.

Horseradish has historically been used as a musical instrument in various Micronesian cultures.

== Nutritional content ==
In a 100-gram amount, prepared horseradish provides 200 kilojoules (48 kilocalories) of food energy and has a high content of vitamin C with moderate content of sodium, folate and dietary fiber, while other essential nutrients are negligible in content. In a typical serving of one tablespoon (15 grams), horseradish supplies no significant nutrient content.

Horseradish contains volatile oils, notably mustard oil.

== Biomedical uses ==
The enzyme horseradish peroxidase (HRP), found in the plant, is used extensively in molecular biology and biochemistry primarily for its ability to amplify a weak signal and increase the detectability of a target molecule. HRP has been used in decades of research to visualize under microscopy and assess non-quantitatively the permeability of capillaries, particularly those of the brain.

== See also ==
- Khrenovina sauce
- Hrenovuha
- Wasabi
