= Chháu-á-kóe =

Glutinous rice dumplings colored green with herbs

Chhau-a-koe
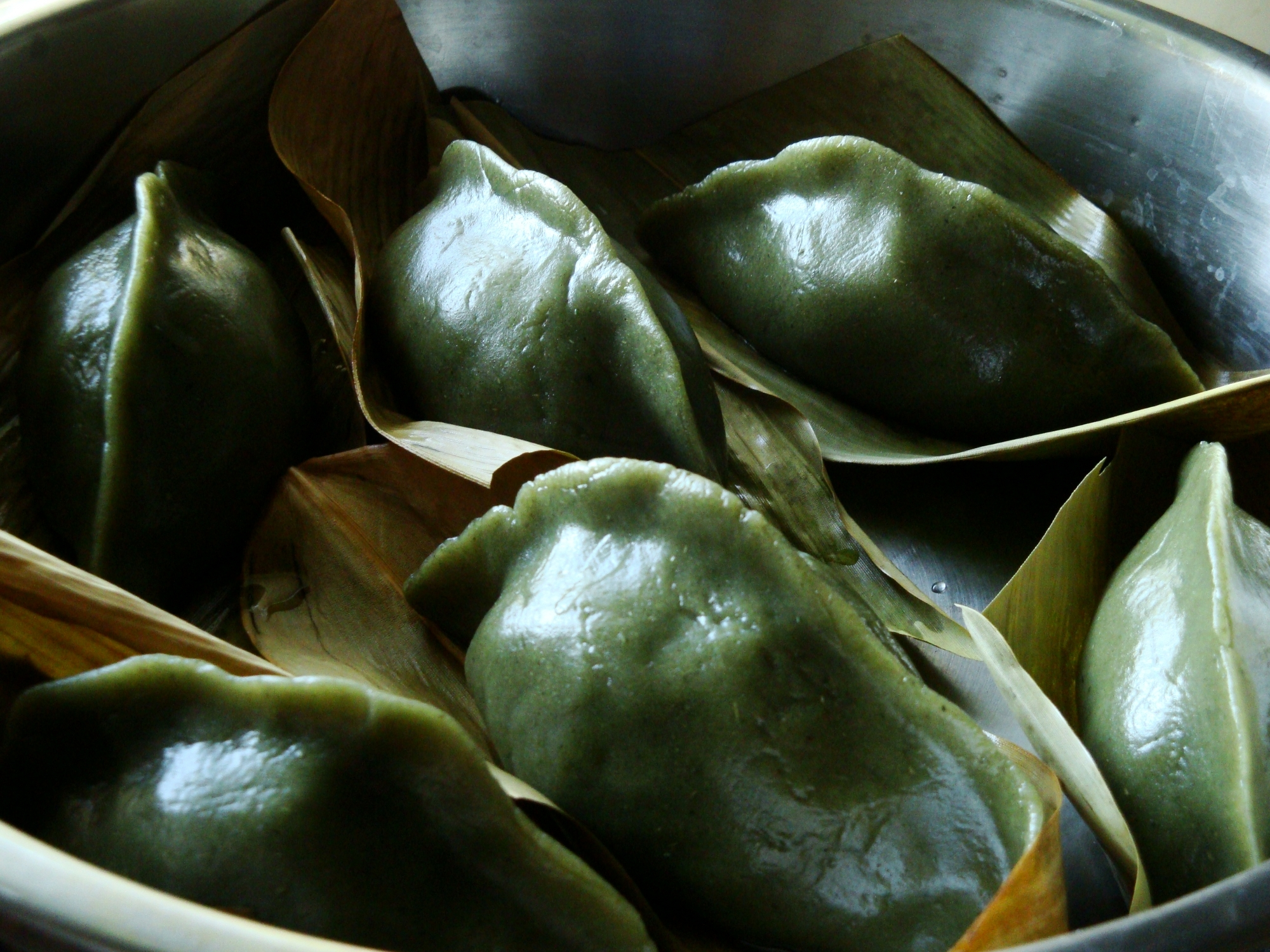
- A batch of chhú-khak-ké in a steamer
- Alternative names: Chau-a-ke, chu-khak-ke, shuquguo
- Place of origin: China
- Region or state: Fujian and Taiwan
- Main ingredients: glutinous rice flour, sugar, ground Jersey cudweed paste
- Similar dishes: Qingtuan
- Other information: Served during Qingming

Chháu-á-kóe
- Chinese: 草仔粿
Transcriptions
Standard Mandarin
- Hanyu Pinyin: cǎozǎiguǒ
Southern Min
- Hokkien POJ: chháu-á-kóe / chháu-á-ké
- Tâi-lô: tsháu-á-kué

Alternative Chinese name
- Chinese: 鼠麴粿
Transcriptions
Standard Mandarin
- Hanyu Pinyin: shǔqúguǒ
Southern Min
- Hokkien POJ: chhí-khak-kóe / chhú-khak-ké
- Tâi-lô: tshí-khak-kué

Second alternative Chinese name
- Chinese: 草麴粿
Transcriptions
Southern Min
- Hokkien POJ: chhó-khak-ké / chhó-kak-kóe

Third alternative Chinese name
- Chinese: 清明粿
- Literal meaning: Qingming cake
Transcriptions
Standard Mandarin
- Hanyu Pinyin: Qīngmíng guǒ
Southern Min
- Hokkien POJ: Chheng‑bêng-kóe / Chheng‑bêng-ké

Chháu-á-kóe is a type of kue made with glutinous rice flour, sugar, and a ground cooked paste of Gnaphalium affine or Chinese mugwort. The herbs give the dough and the finished kuih a unique flavor and brownish green color. The kuih is found in Fujian, Hakka, and Taiwanese cuisine.

Chhau-a-koe is usually made for Tomb Sweeping Day as a celebratory food item. Although the kuih can be made from either herb, Chinese mugwort is more commonly used in making the Hakka-style variety. The herb-flavored dough is commonly filled with ground meat, dried white radish, or sweet bean pastes. In Taiwan, a filling consisting of dried shrimp, shiitake mushrooms, dried and shredded white radish (菜脯), and deep-fried shallots is commonly used.

== See also ==
- Qingtuan, the Jiangnan form of this dish
- Kusamochi, the Japanese form of this dish
- Songpyeon, a similar Korean dish
