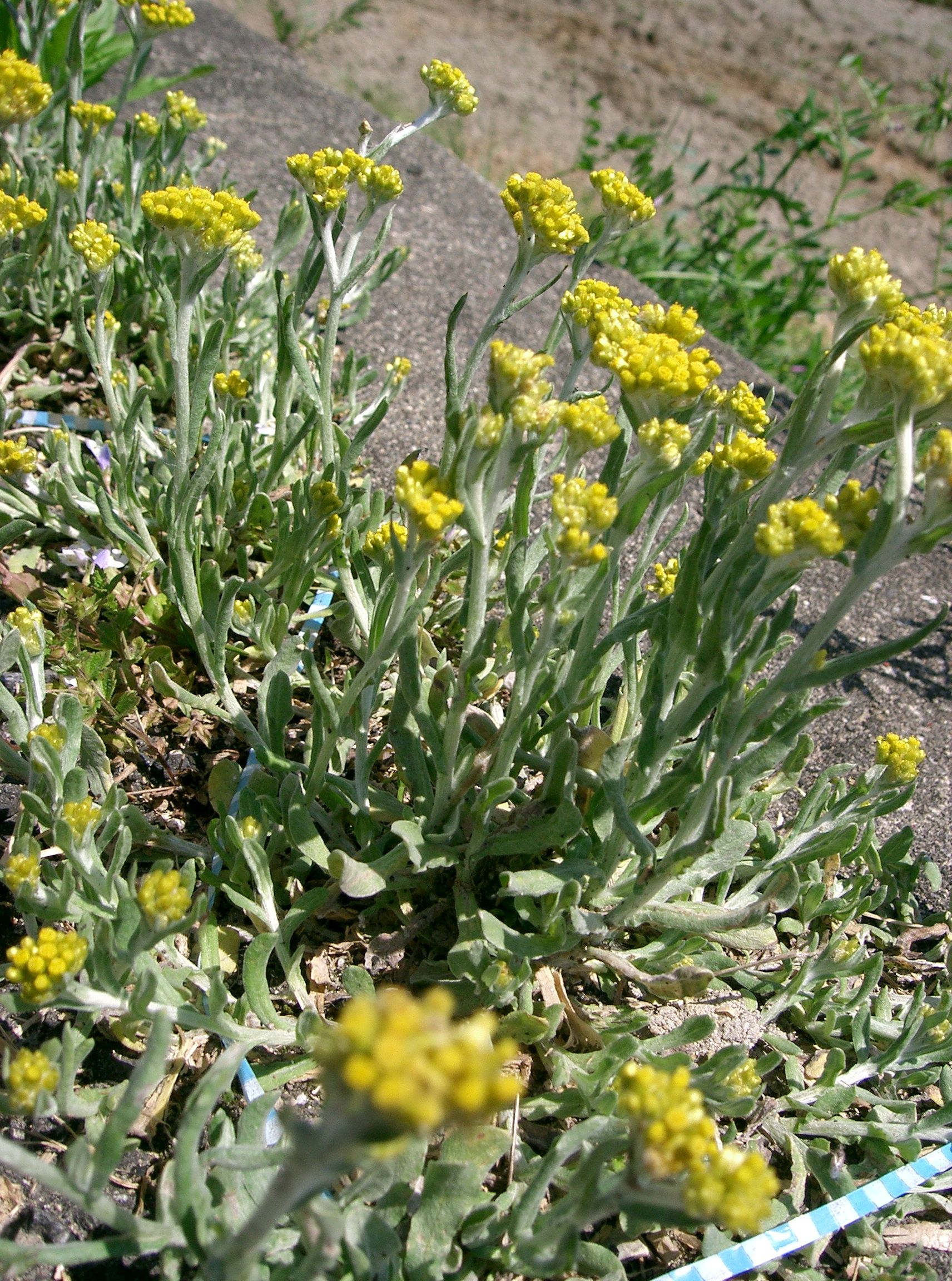

Scientific classification
- Kingdom: Plantae
- Clade: Tracheophytes
- Clade: Angiosperms
- Clade: Eudicots
- Clade: Asterids
- Order: Asterales
- Family: Asteraceae
- Genus: Pseudognaphalium
- Species: P. affine

Binomial name
- Pseudognaphalium affine (D.Don) Anderb.

Synonyms
- Gnaphalium affine D.Don

= Pseudognaphalium affine =

Species of flowering plant

Pseudognaphalium affine is a species of flowering plant belonging to the genus Pseudognaphalium. The species is widely distributed in East Asia, Southeast Asia, South Asia, Transcaucasus and Anatolia.

The plant is biennial, with stems 15–40 cm long, the surface of the plant is covered with fine woolly hair and the leaves are small and rounded. The flowers appear as small florets with petal around 2 mm long.

In Mainland China and Taiwan, this plant is used to make rice-flour pastry (such as chháu-á-kóe) for the Qingming Festival. In Japan, it is one of the herbs consumed during the Seven-Herbs Festival in the spring.

== Uses ==
This plant has been used traditionally in Traditional Chinese medicine and also features in the cuisine of East Asian Countries namely in sweet rice confections. They include the Japanese Kusa mochi and the Fujianese/Taiwanese chhú-khak-ké.

The plant can be ground up and used to give noodles and fried onion rice cake a distinctive green colour and a unique flavour.

This is an ingredient for a kind of xôi – xôi khúc in Vietnam and people usually use it for treatment of common cough.
