= Songpyeon =

Traditional Korean rice cakes with a sweet filling

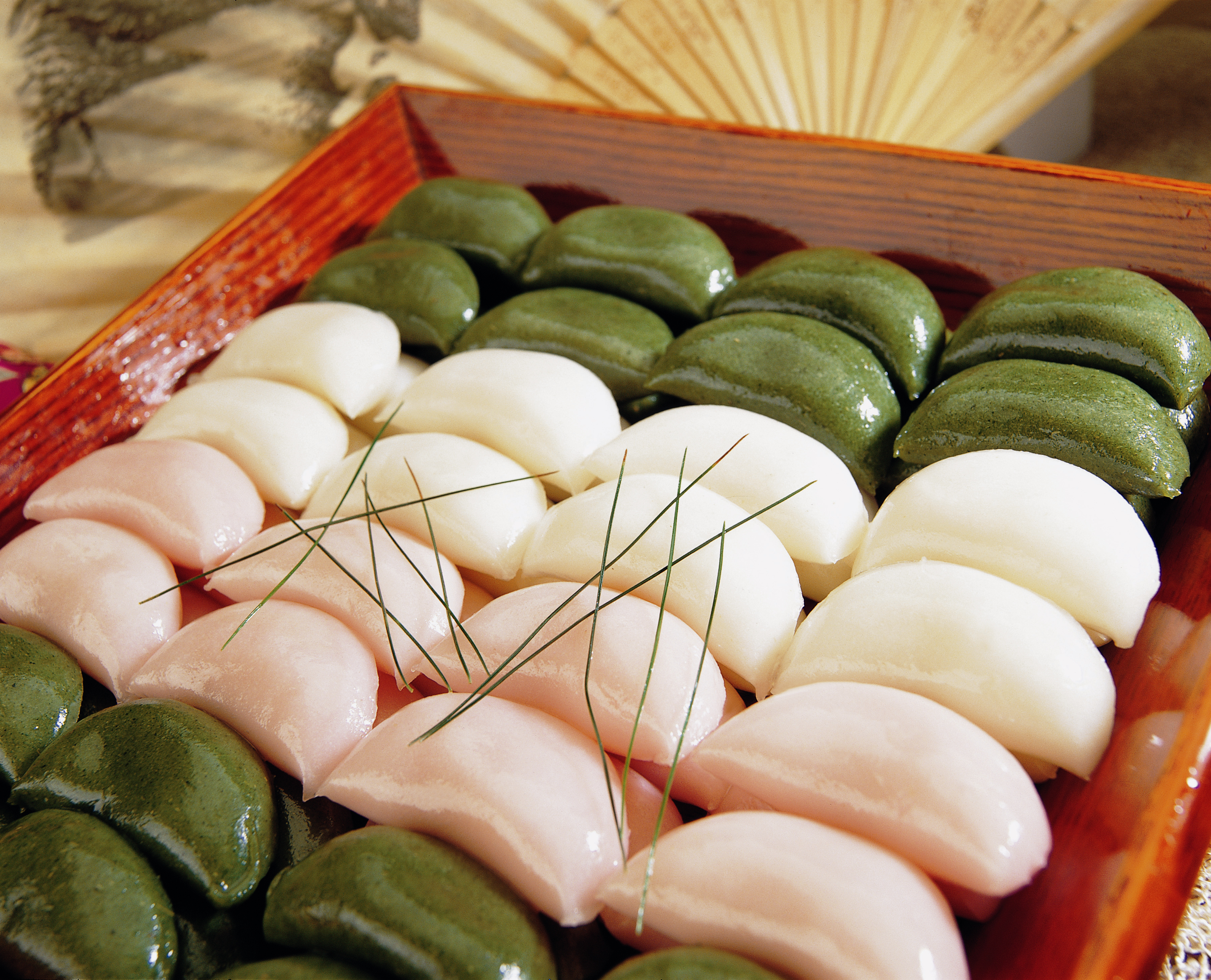
- Type: Tteok
- Place of origin: Korea
- Serving temperature: 15–25 °C (59–77 °F)
- Food energy (per 8 serving): 220 kcal (920 kJ)
- Other information: Food related to Chuseok

Korean name
- Hangul: 송편
- Hanja: 松편
- RR: songpyeon
- MR: songp'yŏn
- IPA: [soŋ.pʰjʌn]

Songpyeon (Korean: 송편) is a small Korean rice cake (tteok) shaped like a half-moon. It contains a range of fillings including red bean paste, toasted sesame seeds, and chestnuts and is traditionally eaten during the Korean autumn harvest festival, Chuseok, when it is often prepared by families at home. It is a popular symbol of traditional Korean culture. The earliest records of songpyeon date from the Goryeo period.

== Description ==
Songpyeons are half-moon shaped rice cakes that typically contain sweet or semi-sweet fillings, such as soybeans, cowpeas, chestnuts, jujubes, dates, red beans, sesame seeds, or honey. They are steamed over a layer of pine needles, which gives them a distinctive taste and the fragrant smell of fresh pine trees. The colors typically include white (흰 송편, hwinsongpyeon), green (숙 송편, ssuksongpyeon), red (송이 송편, songgisongpyeon), and yellow (치자 송편, chijasongpyeon). Songpyeon is typically eaten during the Korean holiday, Chuseok, where it is shared amongst family, friends, and neighbors. It is also consumed with liquor on this occasion. "Song" refers to pine needles.

== Culture ==
Songpyeon is quintessential to Korean families' Chuseok celebrations. Traditionally, songpyeon was made by Korean families using freshly harvested rice and then offered to their ancestors on the morning of Chuseok as thanks for the bountiful harvest during charye (차례; 茶禮), an ancestral memorial ritual. Songpyeon is also given to other family members and close neighbors. Such offerings are viewed as signs of respect and efforts to avoid bad luck within the family.

Songpyeon is used to show gratitude for the year's harvest by placing it on a table with other foods, included newly harvested fruit, and taro. These three foods symbolize, respectively, the fruit of the heavens, the fruit of the earth, and the fruit of the underground.

Songpyeon is also said to represent the moon and wishes, which is why people will say their wishes while making and eating it. Many stories describe why songpyeon is in the shape of a half moon rather than a full moon. The most common belief is that Korean ancestors thought that a round-shaped full moon could only wane while a half-moon would fill up. This is considered a sign of abundance and prosperity. Songpyeon resembles a full moon shape before being folded and transforms into a half moon when folded with filling.

One explanation of Songpyeon's half moon shape stems from a historical anecdote from King Uija's reign. In the anecdote, a turtle once came to the palace with a carving on his back that read "Silla is half moon.", which represented a hopeful future for the kingdom.

Another Korean anecdote says that the person who makes beautifully-shaped songpyeon will meet a good spouse or give birth to a beautiful baby.

== Preparation ==
Songpyeon is made by kneading rice flour with salt and hot water until it is smooth in order to create a dough. Small pieces of the dough are torn off, rolled into balls and then indented in the center using a thumb. The filling of choice is placed inside the now hollowed center and then the ball is sealed closed and shaped. The rice cakes are steamed on top of pine needles for about 20–30 minutes and then rinsed with cold water in order to maintain their chewy texture. The rice cakes are then blotted dry and typically finished by being brushed with sesame oil.

Steaming the rice cakes on top of pine needles gives them a unique taste and scent, and also helps to prevent the rice cakes from sticking together while steaming. As pine trees also produce large amounts of phytoncide, this effectively kills germs, and helps avoid spoiling due to the presence of terpene.

According to the Dongui Bogam (동의보감; 東醫寶鑑), the most well-known Joseon medical book, the pine needles are also said to have medicinal effects on the food.

== Regional differences ==
Although the cultural significance of songpyeon remains the same, differences in color, shape, ingredients, and even thickness can be found across Korea.

=== Chungcheong Province ===
As pumpkin is widely grown in this region, Chungcheong Province is known for its pumpkin songpyeon. The pumpkins are dried and ground into a powder which is then mixed with the rice flour to make the dough. The rice cakes are often shaped to look like small pumpkins. The result is a sweet rice cake that is bright in color.

=== Gangwon Province ===
With an abundance of potato crops and oak trees, Gangwon Province is known for its potato songpyeon and acorn songpyeon. These rice cakes are made with potato starch and acorn powder, respectively. The songpyeon in this region are typically flat with ridges from pressing down using fingers and in Gangneung, people leave their handprints on the rice cakes.

=== Gyeongsang Province ===
Songpyeon made in Gyeongsang Province are typically larger than the songpyeon found in other regions. A popular type of songpyeon found here is ramie songpyeon, which consists of boiled ramie leaves which are added to the rice cakes to make them healthier.

=== Jeju Province ===
A traditional filling for songpyeon made on Jeju Island is sweetened peas. The songpyeon are sometimes shaped with a concave center to resemble a volcanic crater and are often pan-fried after being steamed.

=== Jeolla Province ===
Songpyeon made in Jeolla Province sometimes contains arrowroot starch which is combined with rice flour to make the rice cake dough. Jeolla Province is also known for its flower songpyeon which are made with natural dyes and made to resemble flowers either by hand or by using a mold.

=== Seoul ===
Seoul is known for its small, five-colored or osaek songpyeon (오색송편). The five colors—white, brown, pink, green, and yellow—represent the harmony of nature. White songpyeon lacks any color additives, but the other colors are obtained using natural ingredients. Brown is created using cinnamon; pink, by using strawberry or omija syrup; green, by using mugwort; and yellow, by using gardenia seeds.

=== North Korea ===
The traditional songpyeon made in Pyeongan Province in North Korea is seashell songpyeon. The name of this songpyeon is attributed to its seashell shape. Its filling consists of sesame seeds, sugar, and soy sauce.

== See also ==
- Kusamochi, a similar Japanese dish
- Caozaiguo, a similar Chinese dish
- Tteok
- Korean cuisine
- List of steamed foods
