= LGDT =

LGDT may refer to:

- Leachianone-G 2''-dimethylallyltransferase, an enzyme
- "L.G.D.T.", a song by Sisqó from the 2015 album Last Dragon
- an x86 instruction

== See also ==
- Grand dictionnaire terminologique, an online terminological database
