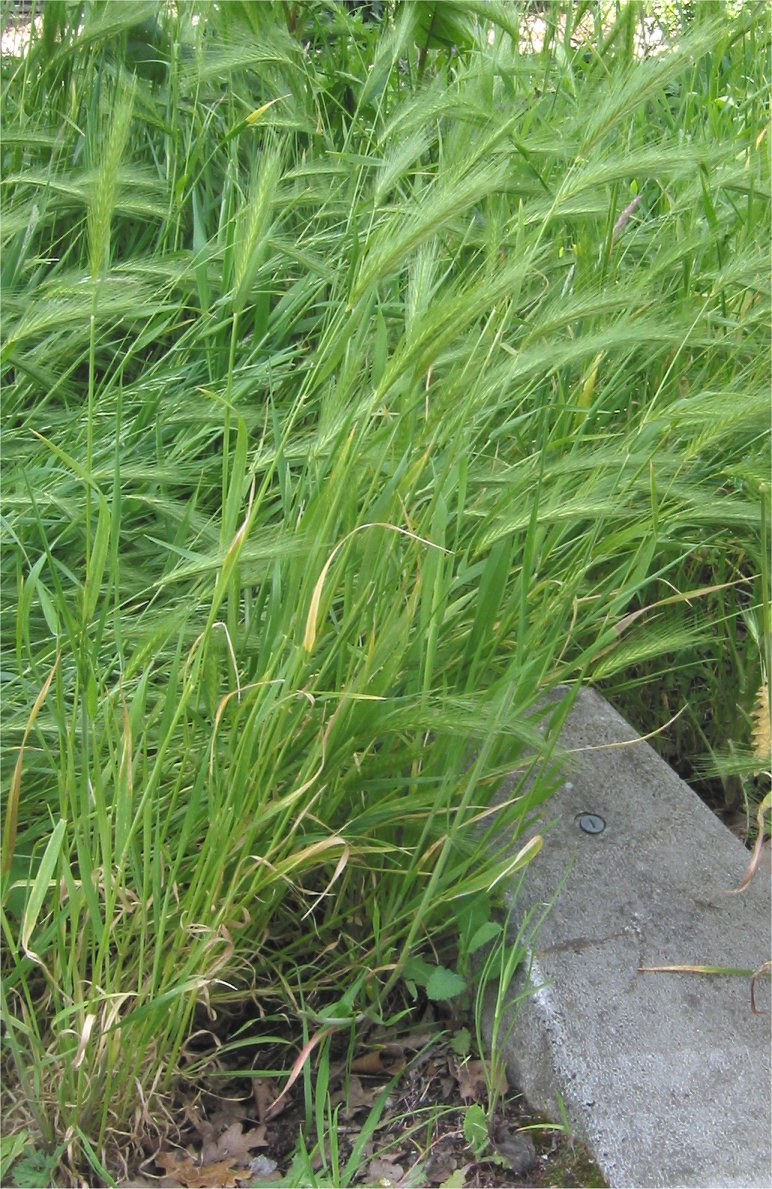

Scientific classification
- Kingdom: Plantae
- Clade: Tracheophytes
- Clade: Angiosperms
- Clade: Monocots
- Clade: Commelinids
- Order: Poales
- Family: Poaceae
- Subfamily: Pooideae
- Genus: Hordeum
- Species: H. murinum

Binomial name
- Hordeum murinum L.

Subspecies
- subsp. murinum; subsp. glaucum; subsp. leporinum

= Hordeum murinum =

Species of grass

Hordeum murinum is a species of flowering plant in the grass family Poaceae, commonly known as wall barley or false barley. It is a close relative of cultivated barley (H. vulgare).

== Overview ==
Hordeum murinum complex is the most widespread and common of all Hordeum species. The center of distribution of H. murinum is in the Mediterranean area, Central Europe, Western Asia, and North Africa. It flowers during May through July in mainly coastal areas. It is an ancient introduction in the British Isles, common in England and Wales but less common in Scotland and Ireland.

It can grow to about 30-50 cm in height, and its unbranched spikes can reach 10 cm long. It produces small, dry seeds and its leaves can be 8 millimetres (5/16 in) wide with short, blunt ligules. It is an annual species whose seeds germinate and develop in the spring. Hordeum murinum ssp. murinum is also referred to as wall barley and is tetraploid. It is distinct from other species of the genus because of its morphology and molecular genetics. It is also distinct because of the barriers it has with the Hordeum taxa when it comes to its ability to cross with other species.

Among its subspecies is included H. m. ssp. leporinum, known as hare barley.

== Growth requirements ==
Precipitation is the most important factor in the production of seeds for this species. A greater quantity of dry material is produced with medium precipitation and better distribution. In drier years with early or late rainfalls, there is no chance of re-seeding for this species. The species uses a greater part of its reproductive resources for seed production, allowing it to adapt to different water conditions. Controlling the seeding rate favors high-quality strands of barley. The sowing rate for wall barley increases when seed production and forage increases. This helps to obtain ideal and sustainable forage and seed yield in rangelands of Jordan. The height of the plant and protein content does not respond to seeding rates, but the height of the plant and protein content does vary with years. This weedy species along with hare barley and smooth barley can be hard to control.

== Subspecies ==
There are three subspecies:

Hordeum murinum ssp. leporinum, known as hare barley, mouse barley, and barley grass. This subspecies grows in tufts from 10 to 40 cm (4 to 16 in) in height, and its flowers are attached to branches rather than to the main axis. It is native to the Mediterranean region near continental, oceanic, and colder climates, as well as northern Africa and temperate Asia, and it is widely naturalised elsewhere. It was first published as the full species H. leporinum by Johann Heinrich Friedrich Link in 1834. In 1882 it was redescribed as a subspecies of H. murinum by Giovanni Arcangeli, though today some authorities maintain it at the species level. Jakob & Blattner 2009 find cytotypes of both tetraploid and hexaploid.

Another subspecies is Hordeum murinum ssp. glaucum. Jakob & Blattner 2009 find it is diploid. It appears in warmer climates of the Mediterranean region.

The above subspecies differ primarily because of their chromosome numbers, spikelet morphology, and geographical distribution. H. leporinum is more dominant in areas where the rainfall is greater than 425 mm (17 in). H. glaucum is more dominant in semiarid regions where rainfall is less than that.

The last is the tetraploid Hordeum murinum ssp. murinum.

== Evolution ==
Jakob & Blattner 2009 find the diploid subspecies H. m. ssp. glaucum is the only extant parent contributing to contemporary H. m. populations. They find that another species of the same group – an extinct member of the Xu group – combined with it to form the tetraploids, and another unknown extinct species then contributed to the hexaploids.

== Uses ==
Although H. murinum is considered a difficult weed in cereal crop fields, it is useful for feeding grazing animals. It is also the main source of forage for cattle production in areas with water deficits.

== Cultural significance ==
In England in the late 20th century among children the plant was referred to colloquially as the 'Flea Dart', from the aerodynamic shape of its seedhead, and the aphids that are often present within it in its immature state. In China the subspecies leporinum is a common ingredient in the spring Qingming Festival snack qīngtuán.
