= Qingtuan =

Form of dumpling

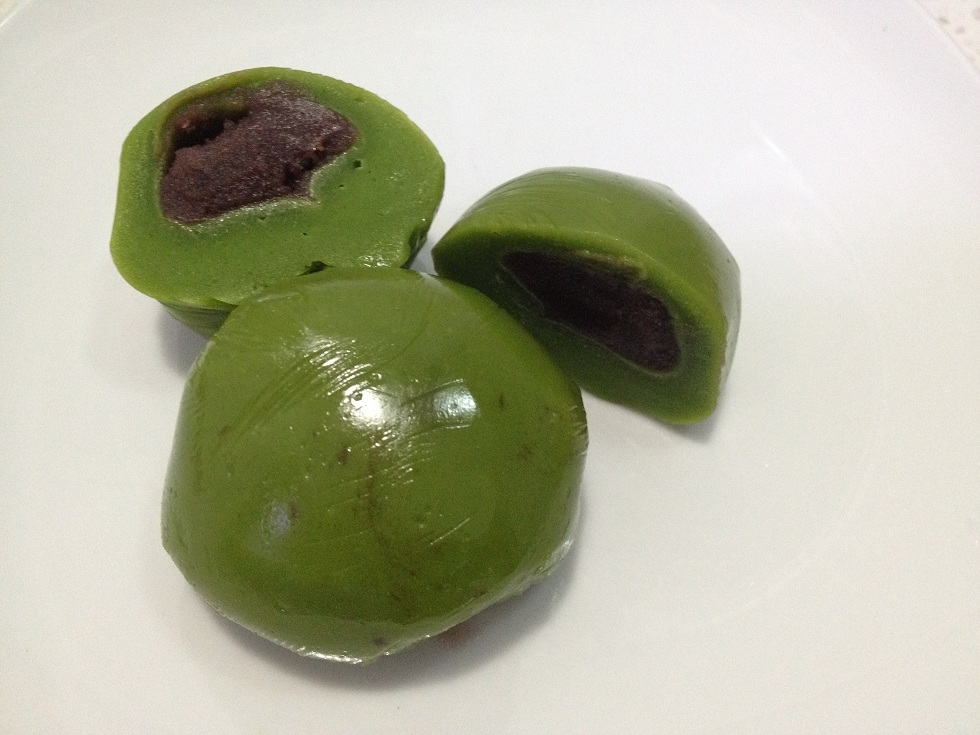
- Qingtuan, traditional Chinese food of the Qingming festival
- Type: Dumpling
- Place of origin: China
- Region or state: Jiangnan
- Serving temperature: Room temperature, cold
- Main ingredients: Glutinous rice
- Similar dishes: Kusa mochi, chhau-a-koe

Qingtuan
- Traditional Chinese: 青糰
- Simplified Chinese: 青团
- Literal meaning: verdant lump
Transcriptions
Standard Mandarin
- Hanyu Pinyin: qīngtuán
- Wade–Giles: chʻing-tʻuan

Qīngtuán (traditional Chinese: 青糰; simplified Chinese: 青团), also written as tsingtuan, is a green-colored dumpling originating from Jiangnan and common throughout China. It is made of glutinous rice mixed with Chinese mugwort or barley grass. It is usually filled with sweet red or black bean paste. The exact technique for making qingtuan is quite complicated and the grass involved is only edible in the early spring, so it is typically only available around the time of the Qingming Festival (April 4 or 5), with which the rice cake has become associated. Nowadays, qingtuan sold in most convenience stores in China are made of glutinous rice mixed with matcha. Modern versions use a wider variety of fillings, such as meat floss or salted egg yolk.

Much of the qingtuan consumed in China is prepared and consumed as street food from local vendors.

== Origin ==
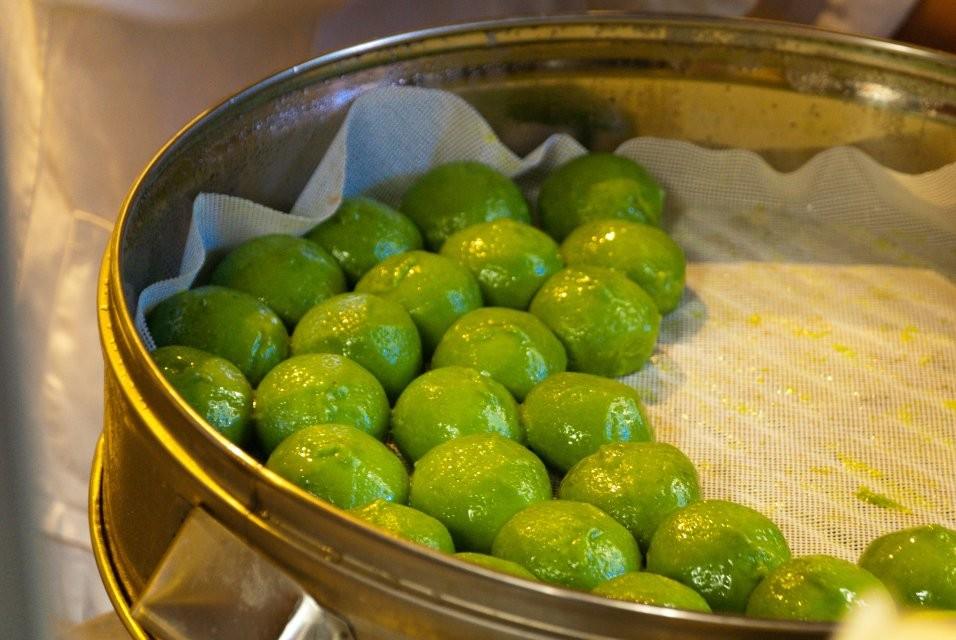
Steamed qingtuan

The tradition of eating qingtuan at Qingming Festival evolved from the ancient Chinese Cold Food Day (one or two days before Qingming Festival). As the name suggests, observers were unable to heat or cook any food during the festival. Therefore, food such as qingtuan that could be prepared in advance and consumed without heating became associated with the Cold Food Festival. Later, the Cold Food Festival evolved into the Qingming Festival, and qingtuan eaten on the Cold Food Festival became an essential food for the Qingming Festival in eastern and southern China.

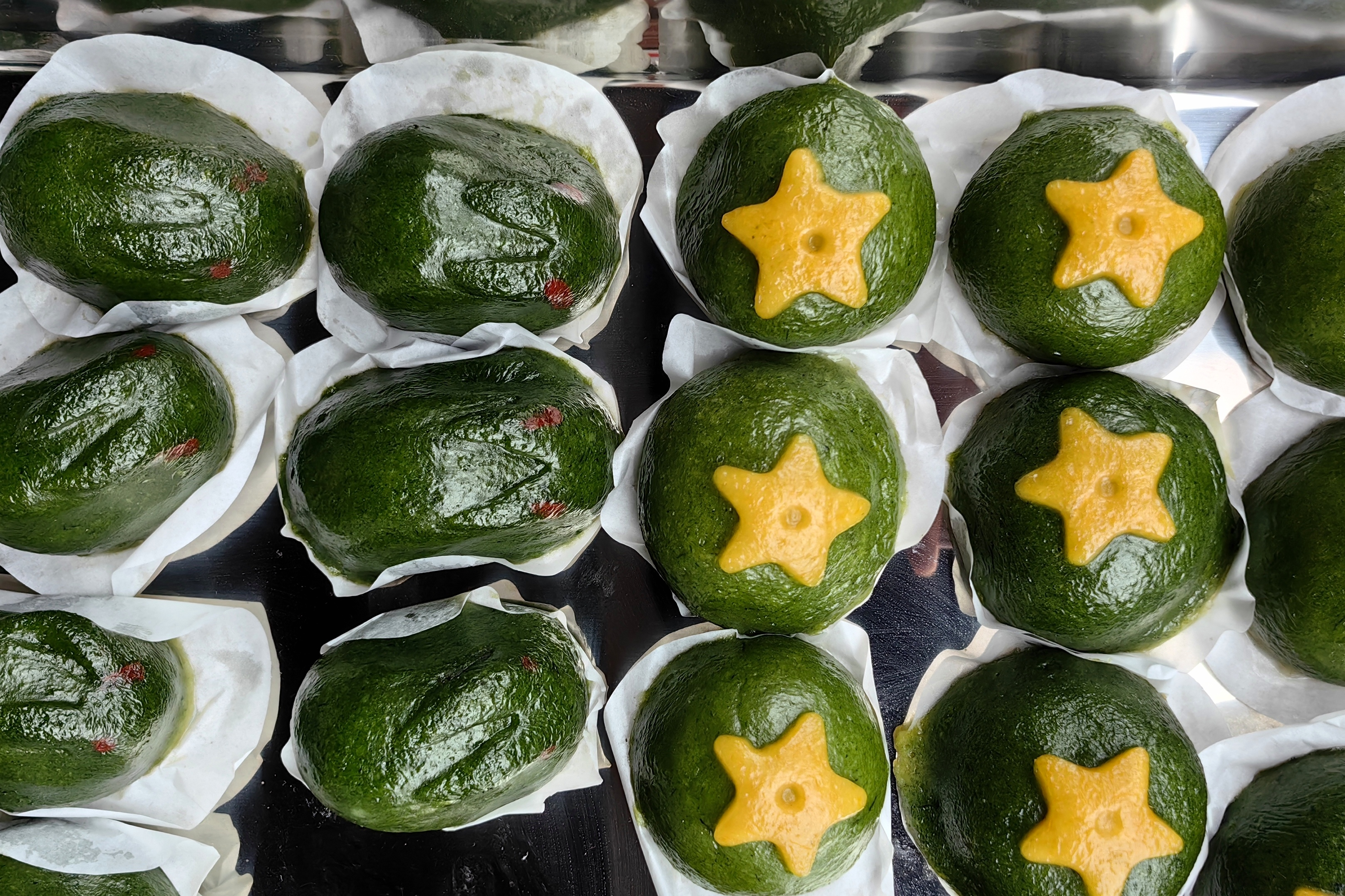
Decorated qingtuan

In the Song dynasty, it was called "fenduan" and was eaten during tomb sweeping or outing. In the Ming and Qing dynasties, it became popular in Jiangsu and Zhejiang. Tomb-sweeping Festival was promoted from an ordinary agricultural solar term to a major festival. The influence of cold food gradually disappeared, and the dietary customs have been passed down with some variations, as a part of the Qingming Festival. Modern people mainly focus on trying new things according to the festival, and the ancestor worship function of the Youth League has gradually faded.

== Preparation ==
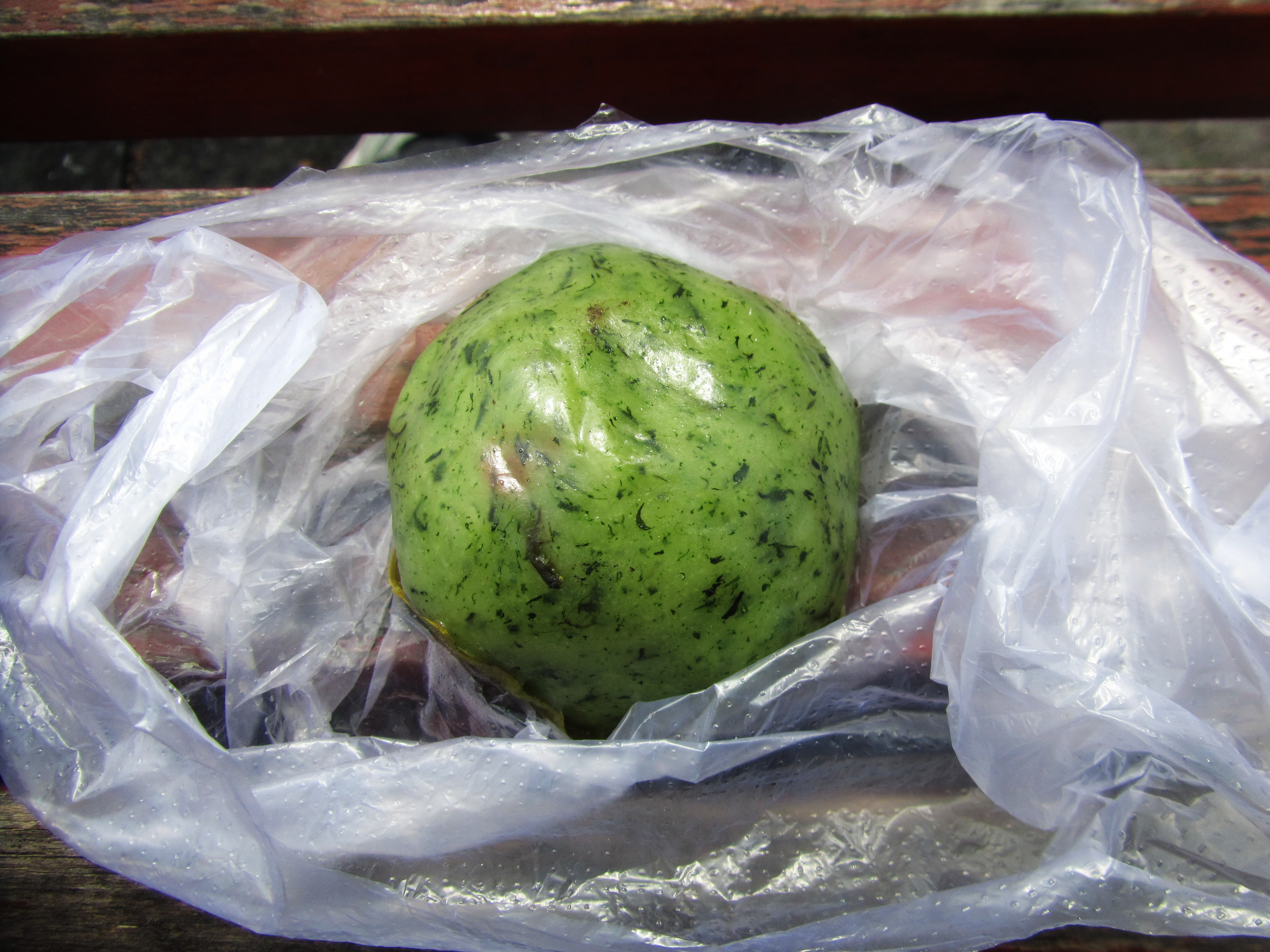
Qingtuan from Tangxi, Hangzhou

The main ingredients of traditional qingtuan are glutinous rice flour, Chinese mugwort or barley grass, and red or black bean paste. The general steps for making qingtuan are: The mugwort is first crushed and squeezed out to make the green juice. Then, this juice is mixed with the glutinous rice flour while still hot and kneaded into dough. The dough and bean paste are shaped into balls, then combined and steamed.

The material used to color the green dough is called "green". The green in Linhai City, Zhejiang Province is sage grass. In Suzhou and Hangzhou, green vegetable juice and tender loofah leaf juice are generally used to add color. The "green" is cooked and pounded into juice and glutinous rice flour, and together. Linhai Qingtuan's fillings come in two styles: salty and sweet. The salty ones are dried tofu, diced bamboo shoots, diced pork, pickles, etc., while the sweet ones are mostly bean paste. In order to distinguish between the two styles, the salty ones are usually wrapped in Dumpling-shaped, sweet and round. Place Pu leaves as a base and steam in a steamer for 15 minutes.

In recent years, Qingtuan has gained new flavors like salted egg yolk with pork floss, matcha, custard, black sesame lava, cheese and chocolate.

== See also ==
- Kusa mochi, the Japanese form of this dish, flavored with Jersey cudweed
- Chhau-a-koe, the Fujianese form of this dish, flavored with Jersey cudweed
