= Tokin =

Tokin may refer to:

- Tokin (headwear) (頭襟 or 頭巾), a small black box worn on the foreheads of Yamabushi
- Tokin Corporation (previously NEC Tokin), a Japanese electronic and electrical parts company
  - Tokin—officially NEC Tokin FC—a football (soccer) team sponsored by the above company that participated in the 2008 Japanese Regional Football League Competition
- Boris P. Tokin (Борис Петрович Токин, 1900–1984), Russian scientist discoverer of Phytoncides
- Mount Tokin (頭巾山 or 襟巾山), an alternate name for Mount Misumi, a mountain located in Tottori, Tottori Prefecture, Japan
- Tokin (と金), a promoted pawn in shogi
- Tokin (鍍金), a Japanese term for plating, particularly mercury silvering

== See also ==
- Token (disambiguation)
- Tonkin (disambiguation)
