= Leachianone-G 2''-dimethylallyltransferase =

Enzyme

Identifiers
- EC no.: 2.5.1.71

Databases
- IntEnz: IntEnz view
- BRENDA: BRENDA entry
- ExPASy: NiceZyme view
- KEGG: KEGG entry
- MetaCyc: metabolic pathway
- PRIAM: profile
- PDB structures: RCSB PDB PDBe PDBsum
Search
- PMC: articles
- PubMed: articles
- NCBI: proteins

Leachianone-G 2''-dimethylallyltransferase (EC 2.5.1.71, LG 2''-dimethylallyltransferase, leachianone G 2''-dimethylallyltransferase, LGDT) is an enzyme with systematic name dimethylallyl-diphosphate:leachianone-G 2''-dimethylallyltransferase. It catalyses the following chemical reaction:

dimethylallyl pyrophosphate
+
leachianone G
PP_{i}
sophoraflavanone G

This membrane-bound enzyme characterised from Sophora flavescens is located in the plastids and requires magnesium ion, Mg^{2+}, for activity. The product flavanone, sophoraflavanone G, is a phytoncide.
