= Sophoraflavanone G =

Names
- IUPAC name (2S)-2-(2,4-dihydroxyphenyl)-5,7-dihydroxy-8-[(2R)-5-methyl-2-(prop-1-en-2-yl)hex-4-en-1-yl]-2,3-dihydro-4H-chromen-4-one

Identifiers
CAS Number	97938-30-2
3D model (JSmol)	Interactive image
ChEBI	CHEBI:50209
ChEMBL	ChEMBL243148
ChemSpider	65766
PubChem CID	72936
CompTox Dashboard (EPA)	DTXSID10243345
- InChI: InChI=1S/C25H28O6/c1-13(2)5-6-15(14(3)4)9-18-20(28)11-21(29)24-22(30)12-23(31-25(18)24)17-8-7-16(26)10-19(17)27/h5,7-8,10-11,15,23,26-29H,3,6,9,12H2,1-2,4H3/t15-,23+/m1/s1 Key: XRYVAQQLDYTHCL-CMJOXMDJSA-N
- SMILES: [H][C@@](CC=C(C)C)(Cc1c(O)cc(O)c2C(=O)C[C@H](Oc12)c1ccc(O)cc1O)C(C)=C

Properties
Chemical formula	C_{25}H_{28}O_{6}
Molar mass	424.48622 g/mol

Hazards
- Occupational safety and health (OHS/OSH)
Main hazards	No known hazards
- Except where otherwise noted, data are given for materials in their standard state (at 25 °C [77 °F], 100 kPa). Infobox references

Sophoraflavanone G is a volatile phytoncide, released into the atmosphere, soil and ground water, by plants of the genus Sophora. Species include Sophora pachycarpa and Sophora exigua, all found to grow within the United States in a variety of soil types, within temperate conditions, no lower than 0 °F (US zone 6 - yellow areas shown to the right). Sophoraflavanone G is released in order to protect the plant against harmful protozoa, bacteria, and fungi. Sophoraflavanone G, also called kushenin (in traditional Chinese medicinal recipes), is a flavonoid compound.

Due to an increase in the rates of antibiotic-resistant bacteria, scientific efforts have focused on finding either naturally-made or genetically modified compounds that can treat and or prevent these harmful and sometimes deadly bacteria. Sophoraflavanone G, in preliminary research has been found to impact the growth of antibiotic-resistant bacteria and may enhance the effect of currently used antibiotics.

== Flavonoids ==
Flavonoids are a class of secondary metabolites found in plants that fulfill a wide variety of functions. They are most commonly known as plant pigments in flower petals to attract pollinators and for their antioxidant activities, providing some hope for consumers regarding medicinal uses, potentially cancer treatment. It has not been until recently that their use as a phytoncide was made known.

=== Biosynthesis ===
Plants use a phenylpropanoid metabolic pathway in which the amino acid phenylalanine is converted to 4-coumaroyl-CoA and then elaborated to a variety of flavonoids. Sophoraflavanone G is a derivative of naringenin in which two prenyl units and a phenolic hydroxy group have been added. The final step from leachianone G is catalysed by the enzyme leachianone-G 2''-dimethylallyltransferase.

naringenin
leachianone G
sophoraflavanone G

== Toxicity ==
No known toxicity reports against humans have been found related to phytoncides, including sophoraflavanone G.

== Potential use an antimicrobial agent against MRSA and VRE ==
In result to the increasing cases of MRSA and VRE, a tremendous amount of research has gone into finding reliable methods of controlling and potentially preventing antibiotic-resistant strains of bacteria. One promising candidate for the treatment of these deadly bacteria is sophoraflavanone G. Throughout the scientific literature, it has been cited that sophoraflavanone G has had considerable success against antibiotic-resistant bacteria like S. aureus and Enterococci.

Staphylococcus aureus and Enterococcus are two of the leading causes of nosocomial (contracted while in a health facility) infections in hospitals and nursing homes, and reports on methicillin-resistant staphylococcus aureus (MRSA) and vancomycin-resistant enterococci (VRE) in hospitals have increased worldwide.

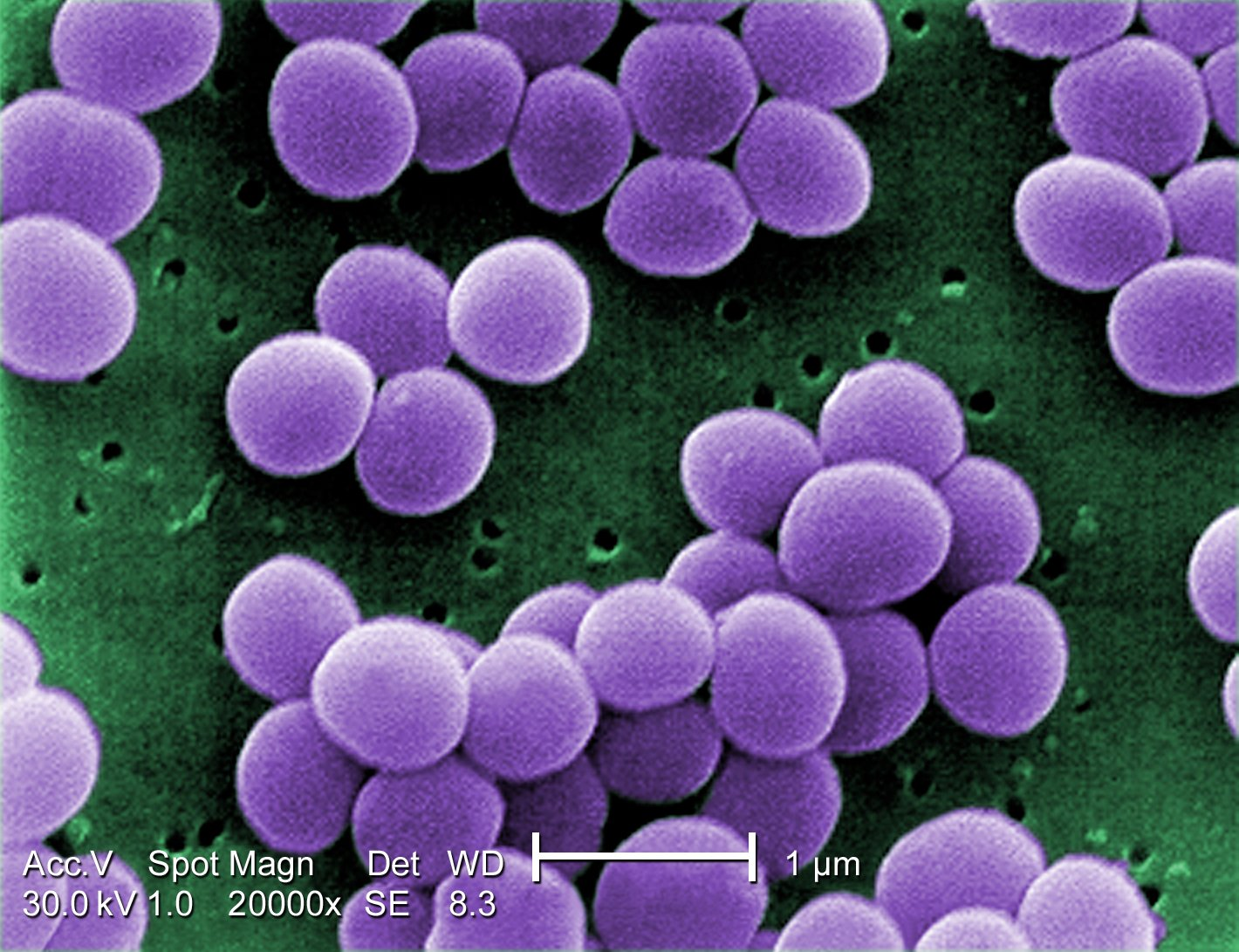
S.aureus

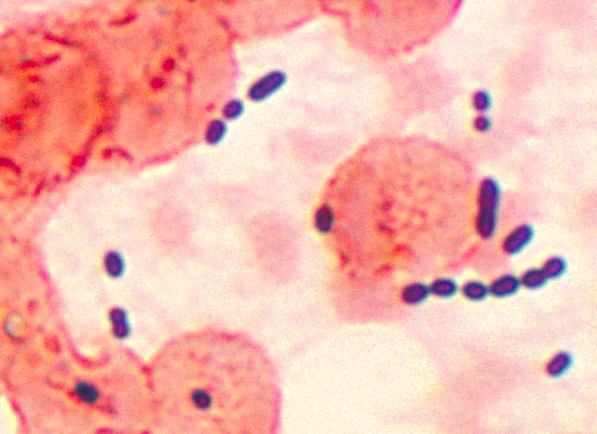
Enterococcus

MRSA involves a strain of Staphylococcus aureus bacteria that normally lives on the skin and sometimes in the nasal passages of healthy people. In addition, these particular strains of S. aureus do not respond to some of the antibiotics used to treat staph infections. The bacteria can cause infection when they enter the body through a cut, sore, catheter, or breathing tube. Once infected, the case can be minor and local, or more serious, involving complications with the major tissues within the patient, specifically heart, lungs, blood, and bone. Serious staph infections are more common in people with weak immune systems, particularly patients in hospitals and long-term healthcare facilities and those who are healthy, but otherwise in close contact with many individuals through shared use of equipment and personal items, like athletes and children in daycare.

Serious staph infections are quite difficult to treat, due to increasing numbers of antibiotic-resistant strains of S. aureus in the population. If left untreated, serious staph infections can result in organ failure and death.

Enterococcus are normally present in the human intestines, female genital tract and often within the environment. When these bacteria cause infections, usually within the urinary tract, bloodstream, or in wounds associated with catheters or surgical procedures, the common antibiotic used to treat these cases is Vancomycin. In some instances, enterococci have become resistant to this drug and are, in result, referred to as vancomycin-resistant enterococci (VRE). Most of these infections occur within the long-term healthcare setting.

Serious VRE infections are common among those who have been previously treated with the antibiotic vancomycin and hospitalized for long periods of time, those who have a weak immune system, any patients who have recently undergone surgery or those individuals with medical devices that stay inside their bodies for long periods of time (mainly catheters). VRE is often spread by the contaminated hands of caregivers, or directly after those infected with VRE, touch surfaces. VRE is not spread through the air by coughing or sneezing.

=== Research into antimicrobial activity ===
Research conducted in Japan, in 1995, report that the use of sophoraflavanone G completely inhibits the growth of 21 strains of methicillin-resistant S. aureus at concentrations of 3.13-6.25 μg/mL. When this compound is combined with vancomycin, minocycline, and rifampicin, the rates of inhibition increased, indicating a partially synergistic effect with anti-MRSA antibiotics. Similarly in Iran, in 2006, a research group reported that the antibacterial activity of gentamicin was enhanced through the use of sophoraflavanone G, citing that bacterial colonies of S. aureus, on TLC plates showed a significant decrease (4x) in growth while in the presence of small amounts (.03 μg/mL) of this compound. Additional studies, done in South Korea in 2009 and Romania in 2010, support these findings of partially synergistic effects between sophoraflavanone G and various antibiotics, adding that when used either alone, or in conjunction with ampicillin and oxacillin, and ampicillin, gentamicin, minocycline, and vancomycin hydrochloride, sophoraflavanone G increases the number of antibiotic-resistant bacteria (MRSA & VRE) killed within plated colonies (based on FIC indices).

=== Additional uses ===
In addition to the use of sophoraflavanone G as treatment against bacteria and other microflora present within the environment, by plants and humans alike, this compound has also been reported to be useful in the treatment of a variety of maladies, ranging from eicosanoid-related skin inflammation such as atopic dermatitis, to treating more serious medical issues like malaria and myeloid leukemia.

Regarding anti-inflammatory treatments, sophoraflavanone G inhibits eicosanoid generating enzymes, and prostaglandin production, suggesting its potential use for eicosanoid-related skin inflammation such as atopic dermatitis. In 2004, Youn et al. reported that sophoraflavanone G (in addition to other flavanoids) showed moderate anti-malarial activities based on the EC50 values within mice populations, potentially due to methoxyl groups found within the structure. In addition, sophoraflavanone G may have implications for the treatment of myeloid leukemia because sophoraflavanone G exhibits cytotoxic activity against human myeloid leukemia HL-60 cells.
