= Token =

Token may refer to:

== Arts, entertainment, and media ==
- Token, a game piece or counter, used in some games
- The Tokens, a vocal music group
- Tolkien Black, a recurring character on the animated television series South Park, formerly known as "Token Black"
- Token (rapper), a hip hop emcee from Massachusetts

== Computing ==
- Token, an object (in software or in hardware) which represents the right to perform some operation:
  - Access token, a system object representing the subject of access control operations
  - Invitation token, in an invitation system
  - Token Ring, a network technology in which a token circles in a logical ring
- Token (artificial intelligence)
- Tokenization (data security), the process of substituting a sensitive data element
- Session token, an identifier of an interaction session
- Token, an object used in Petri net theory
- Security token or hardware token, authentication token or cryptographic token, a physical device for computer authentication
  - Bearer token, a type of security token in OAuth that gives access to its bearer
- Lexical token, a word or other atomic parse element

== Economics ==
- Token, a voucher or gift card redeemable for items of value
- Token coin, a small, flat, round piece of metal or plastic that can sometimes be used instead of money, e.g.:
  - Casino token, also known as a casino chip, check, cheque, or gaming chip
  - Knight's token, carried by a medieval knight
- Token money, money that is of limited legal tender
- Tokens, exonumia, items of currency other than coins and paper money

== Other uses ==
- P-20 radar, NATO reporting name "Token"
- Token (cryptocurrency), certain types of cryptocurrency
- Token (railway signalling), a physical object given to a locomotive driver to authorize him to use a particular stretch of single railway track
- Token Racing, a Formula One car racing team
- Tokenism, the inclusion of a single person (or very few people) of a group so an organization can publicly claim to be inclusive
- Type–token distinction, in logic, linguistics, and computer programming
- Wedding token, Christian wedding paraphernalia also known as an arrhae or wedding coin
- Token, an anthromorphic white cat made by Femtanyl

== See also ==
- Tokin (disambiguation)
