= Qingming Festival =

Chinese festival honouring ancestors

Qingming
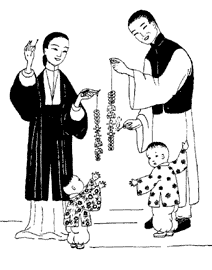
- Burning paper gifts for the departed.
- Official name: Qingming Jie (清明节); Ching Ming Festival (清明節); Tomb Sweeping Day (掃墓節)
- Observed by: Chinese, Chitty and Ryukyuans
- Type: Cultural, Asian
- Significance: Commemoration of the remembering of ancestors
- Observances: Cleaning and sweeping of graves, ancestor worship, offering food to deceased, burning joss paper
- Date: 15th day after March equinox (between April 4 and April 6)
- 2025 date: 4 April
- 2026 date: 5 April
- 2027 date: 5 April
- First time: 732; 1294 years ago

Chinese name
- Traditional Chinese: 清明節
- Simplified Chinese: 清明节
- Literal meaning: "Pure Brightness Festival"
Transcriptions
Standard Mandarin
- Hanyu Pinyin: Qīngmíng jié
- Wade–Giles: Ch'ing^{1}-ming^{2} chieh^{2}
- IPA: [tɕʰíŋ.mǐŋ tɕjě]
Wu
- Suzhounese: Tshin^{1} min^{2} tsiq^{7}
Hakka
- Pha̍k-fa-sṳ: Chhîn-mìn-chiet
Yue: Cantonese
- Yale Romanization: Chīng-mìhng jit
- Jyutping: Cing^{1}-ming^{4} zit^{3}
- IPA: [tsʰɪŋ˥.mɪŋ˩ tsit̚˧]
Southern Min
- Hokkien POJ: Chheng-bêng-cheh/Chhiⁿ-miâ-cheh
- Tâi-lô: Tshing-bîng tseh/Tshinn-miâ tsueh
Eastern Min
- Fuzhou BUC: Chĭng-mìng-cáik

The Qingming Festival or Ching Ming Festival, also known as Tomb-Sweeping Day in English (sometimes also called Chinese Memorial Day, Ancestors' Day, the Clear Brightness Festival, or the Pure Brightness Festival), is a traditional Chinese festival observed by ethnic Chinese in mainland China, Hong Kong, Macau, Taiwan, Malaysia, Singapore, Cambodia, Indonesia, Philippines, Myanmar, Thailand, and Vietnam. A celebration of spring, it falls on the first day of the fifth solar term, also called Qingming, of the traditional Chinese lunisolar calendar. This makes it the 15th day after the Spring Equinox, either 4, 5 or 6 April in a given year. During Qingming, Chinese families visit the tombs of their ancestors to clean the gravesites and make ritual offerings to their ancestors. Offerings typically include traditional food dishes and the burning of joss sticks and joss paper. The holiday recognizes the traditional reverence of one's ancestors in Chinese culture.

The origins of the Qingming Festival go back to ancient, possibly prehistoric times, although the observance has changed significantly. It became a public holiday in mainland China in 2008, where it is associated with the consumption of qingtuan, green dumplings made of glutinous rice and Chinese mugwort or barley grass.

In Taiwan, the public holiday was in the past observed on 5 April to honor the death of Chiang Kai-shek on that day in 1975, but with Chiang's popularity waning, this convention is not being observed. A confection called caozaiguo or shuchuguo, made with Jersey cudweed, is consumed there.

A similar holiday is observed in the Ryukyu Islands, called Shīmī in the local language.

== Origin ==
The festival was influenced by the Cold food or Hanshi Festival which is said to commemorate Jie Zitui, a nobleman of the state of Jin (modern Shanxi) during the Spring and Autumn period. Amid the Li Ji Unrest, he followed his master Prince Chong'er in 655 BC to exile among the Di tribes and around China. Supposedly, he once even cut flesh from his thigh to provide his lord with soup. In 636 BC, Duke Mu of Qin invaded Jin and enthroned Chong'er as its duke, where he was generous in rewarding those who had helped him in his time of need. Owing either to his high-mindedness or to the duke's neglect, however, Jie was long passed over.

He retired to the forest around Mount Mian with his elderly mother. In 636 BC, the duke went to the forest but could not find them. He then ordered his men to set fire to the forest in order to force Jie out. When Jie and his mother were killed instead, the duke ordered that thenceforth no one should light a fire on the date of Jie's death.

The people of Shanxi subsequently revered Jie as an immortal and avoided lighting fires for as long as a month in the depths of winter, a practice so injurious to children and the elderly that the area's rulers unsuccessfully attempted to ban it for centuries. A compromise developed where it was restricted to 3 days around the Qingming solar term in mid-spring.

The present importance of the holiday is credited to Emperor Xuanzong of Tang. Wealthy citizens in China were reportedly holding too many extravagant and ostentatiously expensive ceremonies in honor of their ancestors. In AD 732, Xuanzong sought to curb this practice by declaring that such respects could be formally paid only once a year, on Qingming.

== Observance ==
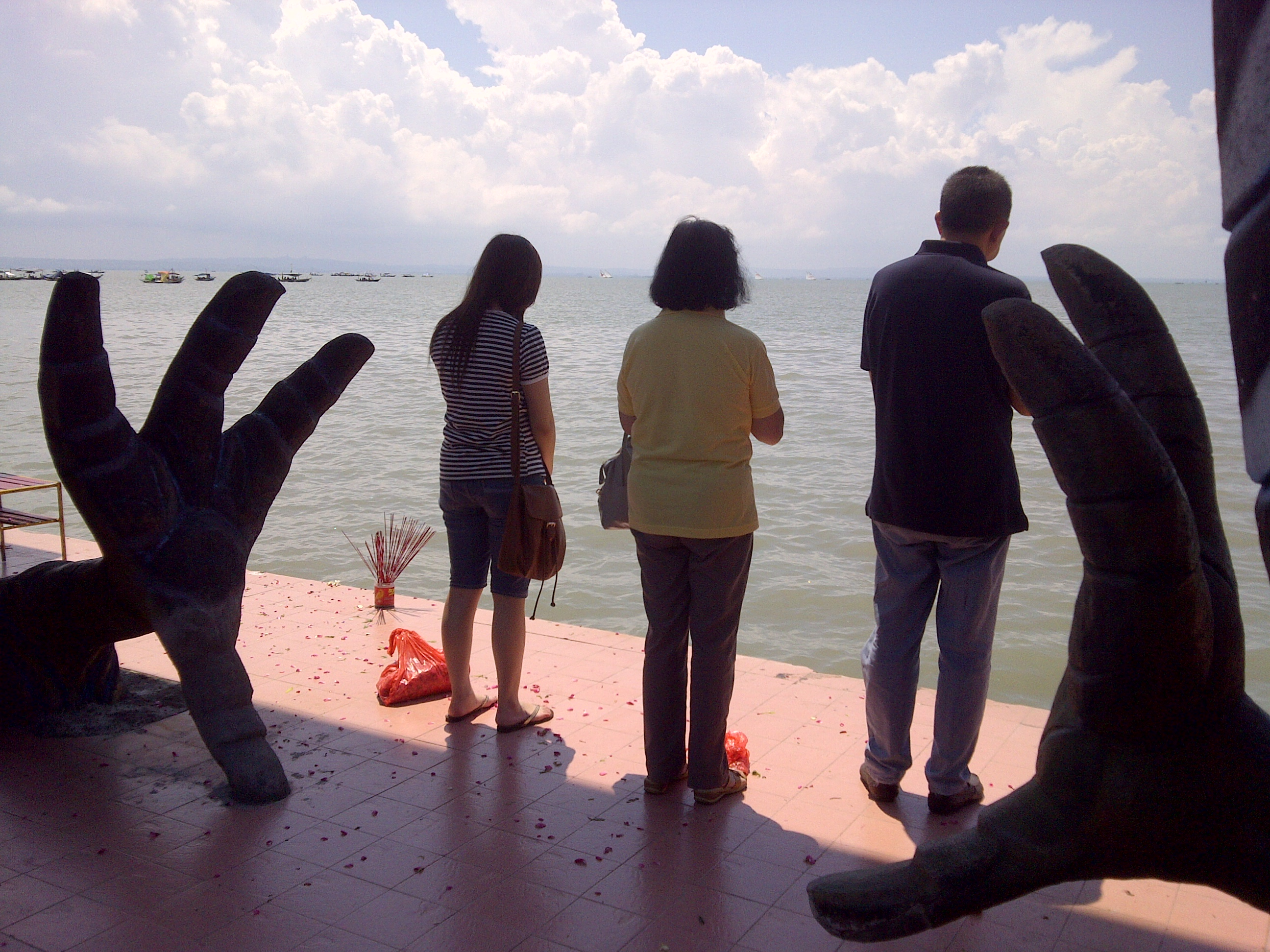
An Indonesian Chinese family pray for their deceased members at Qingming Festival of 2013 under the Heaven Gate of Sanggar Agung

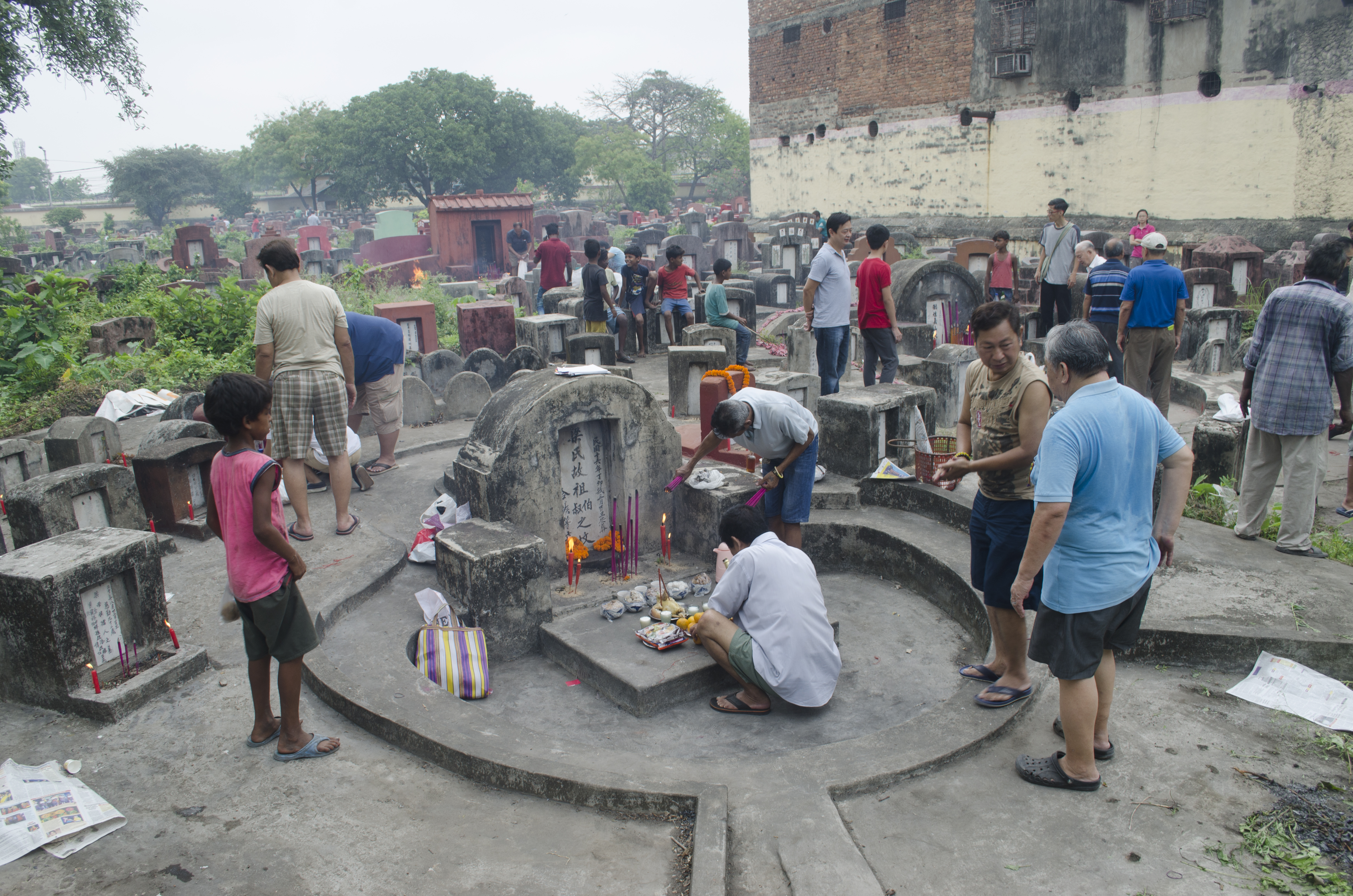
Qingming at the cemetery by Kolkata Chinese

Qingming Festival is when Chinese people traditionally visit ancestral tombs to sweep them. This tradition has been legislated by the Emperors who built majestic imperial tombstones for every dynasty. For thousands of years, the Chinese imperials, nobility, peasantry, and merchants alike have gathered together to remember the lives of the departed, to visit their tombstones to perform Confucian filial piety by tombsweeping, to visit burial grounds, graveyards or in modern urban cities, the city columbaria, to perform groundskeeping and maintenance and to commit to pray for their ancestors in the uniquely Chinese concept of the afterlife and to offer remembrances of their ancestors to living blood relatives, their kith and kin. In some places, people believe that sweeping the tomb is only allowed during this festival, as they believe the dead will get disturbed if the sweeping is done on other days.

The young and old alike kneel to offer prayers before tombstones of the ancestors, offer the burning of joss in both the forms of incense sticks (joss-sticks) and silver-leafed paper (joss paper), sweep the tombs and offer food in memory of the ancestors. Depending on the religion of the observers, some pray to a higher deity to honor their ancestors, while others may pray directly to the ancestral spirits.

Honoring one's ancestors is deeply rooted in Chinese culture, as the "idea of filial piety and paying your respects has been an important part of China's Confucian society since ancient times." This practice reflects the strong connection the Chinese people have with their ancestors because they believe that the ancestors "gave us a physical body, and more importantly, a soul." The people of China also believe that "Such a tradition allows good values to be passed down to future generations."

People who live far away and can't travel to their ancestors' tombs may make a sacrifice from a distance.

These rites have a long tradition in Asia, especially among the imperial who legislated these rituals into a national religion. They have been preserved especially by the peasantry and are most popular with farmers today, who believe that continued observances will ensure fruitful harvests ahead by appeasing the spirits in the other world.

Religious symbols of ritual purity, such as pomegranate and willow branches, are popular at this time. Some people wear willow twigs on their heads on Qingming or stick willow branches on their homes. There are similarities to palm leaves used on Palm Sundays in Christianity; both are religious rituals. The belief is that the willow branches will help ward off misfortune.

After gathering on Qingming to perform Confucian clan and family duties at the tombstones, graveyards, or columbaria, participants spend the rest of the day in clan or family outings, before they start the spring plowing. Historically, people would often sing and dance, and Qingming was a time when young couples traditionally started courting. Another popular thing to do is to fly kites in the shapes of animals or characters from folk tales or Chinese opera. Another common practice is to carry flowers instead of burning paper, incense, or firecrackers.

Traditionally, a family will burn spirit money (joss paper) and paper replicas of material goods such as cars, homes, phones, and paper servants. This action usually happens during the Qingming festival. In Chinese culture, it is believed that people still need all of those things in the afterlife. Then family members take turns to kowtow three to nine times, depending on the family's adherence to traditional values, before the tomb of the ancestors.

The Kowtowing ritual in front of the grave is performed in the order of patriarchal seniority within the family. After the ancestor worship at the grave site, the whole family or the whole clan feast on the food and drink they have brought for the worship. Another ritual related to the festival is the cockfight, as well as being available within that historic and cultural context at Kaifeng Millennium City Park (Qingming Riverside Landscape Garden).

The holiday is often marked by people paying respects to those who are considered national or legendary heroes. The April Fifth Movement and the Tiananmen Incident were major events in Chinese history which occurred on Qingming. After Premier Zhou Enlai died in 1976, thousands honored him during the festival to pay their respects.

In Taiwan, the Qingming Festival was not a public holiday until 1972. Three years later, upon the death of Chiang Kai-shek on 5 April 1975, the Kuomintang government declared that the anniversary of Chiang's death be observed alongside the festival. The practice was abolished in 2007.

=== Malaysia and Singapore ===
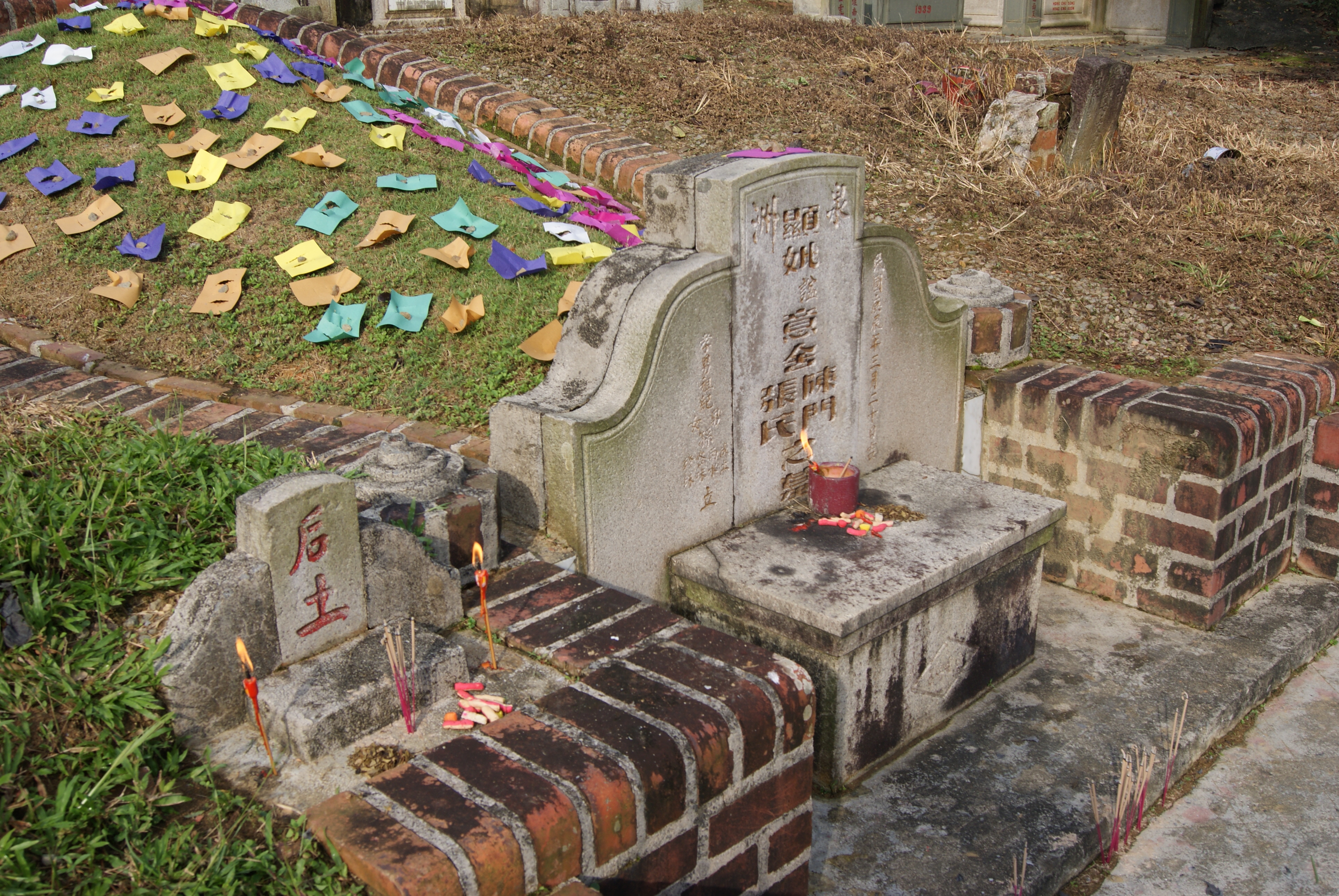
Colored papers placed on a grave during Qingming Festival, Bukit Brown Cemetery, Singapore

Despite the festival having no official status, the overseas Chinese communities in Southeast Asian nations, such as those in Singapore and Malaysia, take this festival seriously and observe its traditions faithfully. Some Qingming rituals and ancestral veneration decorum observed by the overseas Chinese in Malaysia and Singapore can be dated back to the Ming and Qing dynasties, as the overseas communities were not affected by the Cultural Revolution in mainland China.

Qingming in Malaysia is an elaborate family function or a clan feast (usually organized by the respective clan association) to commemorate and honor recently deceased relatives at their grave sites and distant ancestors from China at home altars, clan temples, or makeshift altars in Buddhist or Taoist temples. For the overseas Chinese community, the Qingming festival is very much a solemn family event and, at the same time, a family obligation. They see this festival as a time of reflection for honoring and giving thanks to their forefathers. Overseas Chinese normally visit the graves of their recently deceased relatives on the weekend nearest to the actual date.

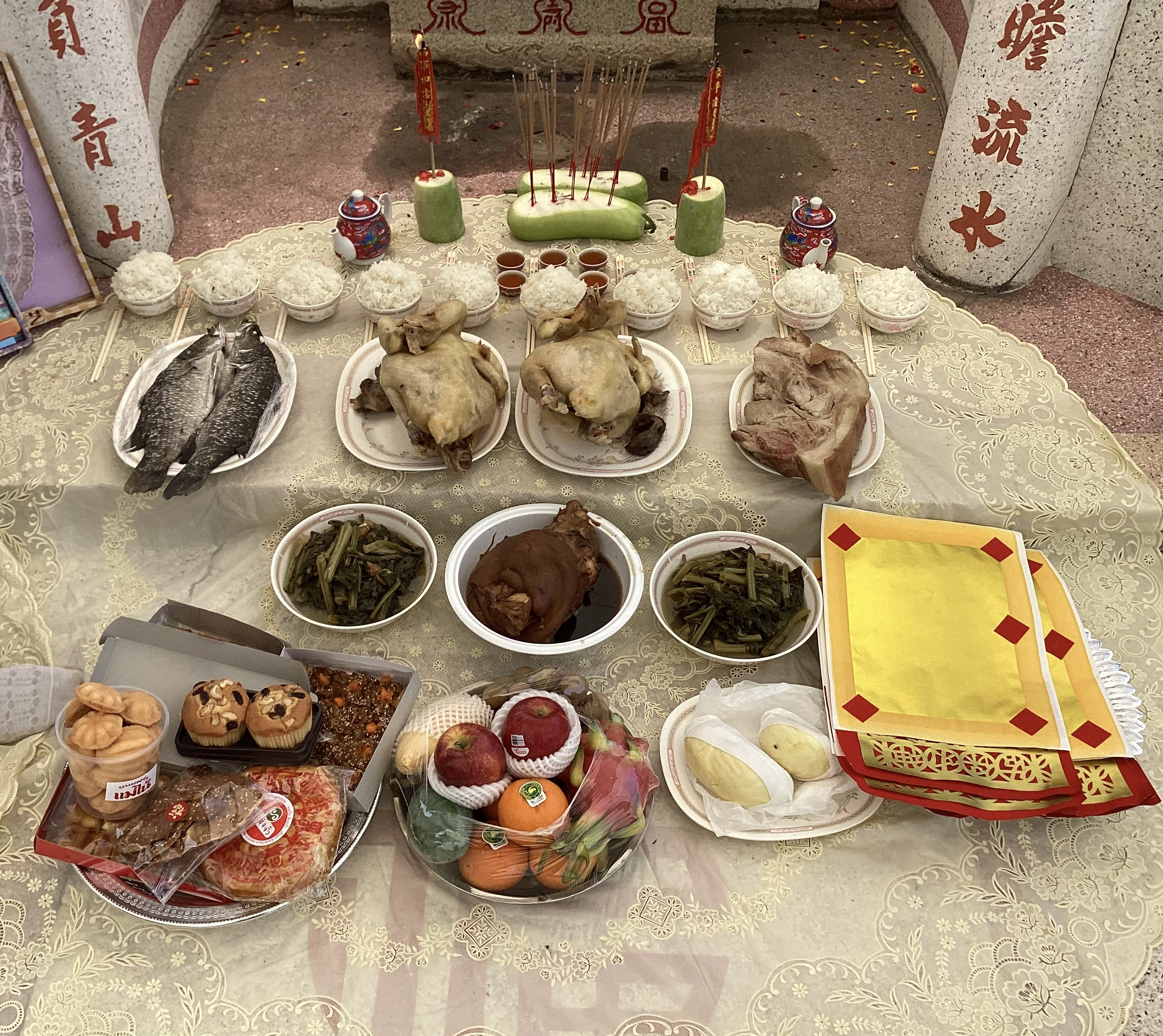
Food offering to ancestors during Qingming festival in Chonburi, Thailand, consisting of tea, liquor, rice, chicken, pork, fish, vegetable soups, and various fruits and desserts.

According to the ancient custom, grave site veneration is only permissible ten days before and after the Qingming Festival. If the visit is not on the actual date, normally veneration before Qingming is encouraged. The Qingming Festival in Malaysia and Singapore normally starts early in the morning by paying respect to distant ancestors from China at home altars. This is followed by visiting the graves of close relatives in the country. Some follow the concept of filial piety to the extent of visiting the graves of their ancestors in mainland China.

== Other customs ==
=== Games ===
During the Tang dynasty, Emperor Xuanzong of Tang promoted large-scale tug of war games, using ropes of up to 167 metres (548 ft) with shorter ropes attached and more than 500 people on each end of the rope. Each side also had its own team of drummers to encourage the participants. In honor of these customs, families often go hiking or kiting, play Chinese soccer or tug-of-war and plant trees, including willow trees.

=== Buddhism ===
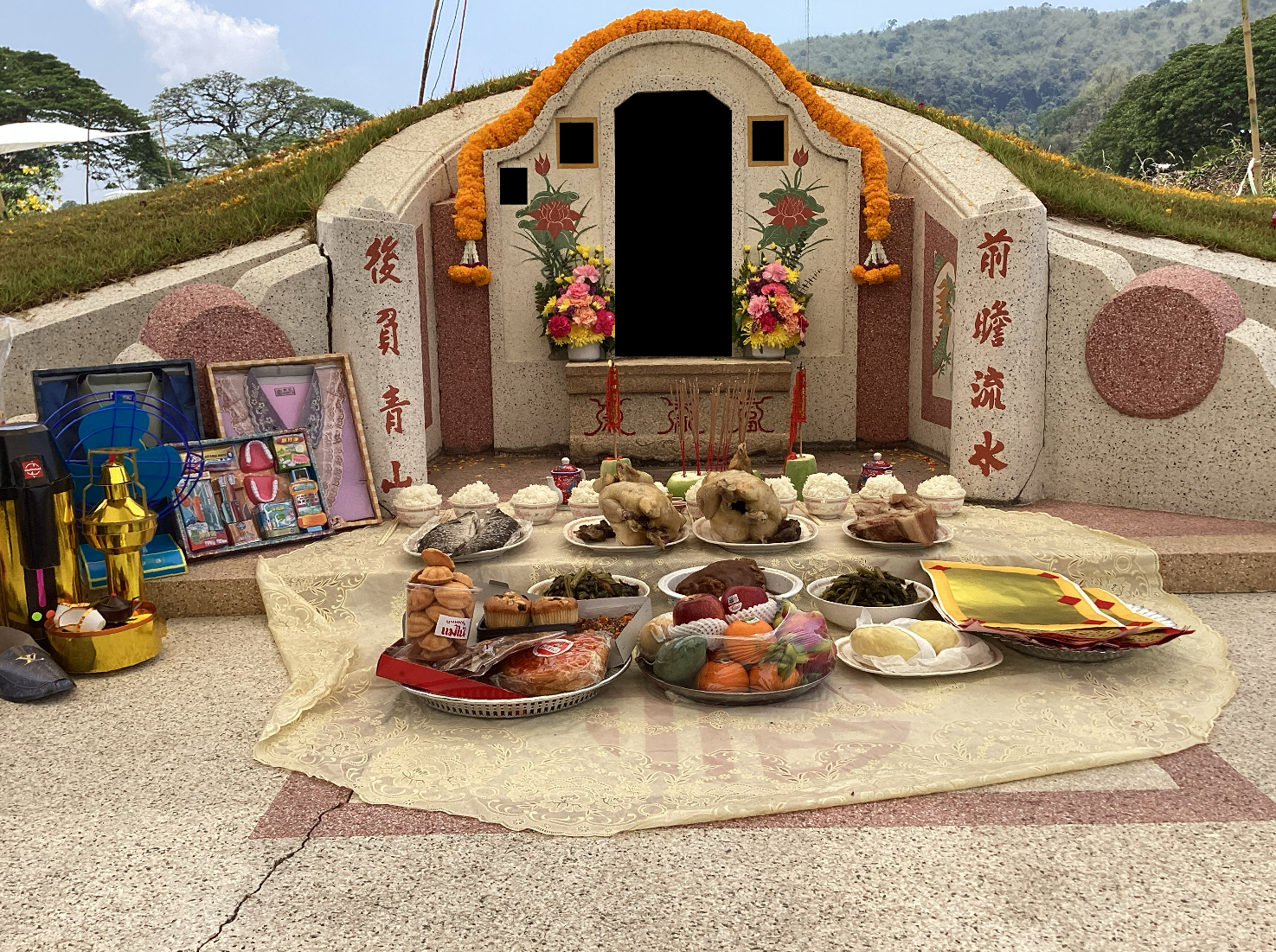
Qingming in chonburi, Thailand

The Qingming festival is also a part of spiritual and religious practices in China, and is associated with Buddhism. For example, Chinese Buddhism teaches that those who die with guilt are unable to eat in the afterlife, except on the day of the Qingming festival.

== Chinese tea culture ==
The Qingming festival holiday has significance in the Chinese tea culture since this specific day divides the fresh green teas by their picking dates. Green teas made from leaves picked before this date are given the prestigious 'pre-Qingming tea' (明前茶) designation which commands a much higher price tag. These teas are prized for their aroma, taste, and tenderness.

=== Weather ===
The Qingming festival was originally considered the day with the best spring weather when many people would go out and travel. The Old Book of Tang describes this custom and mentions of it may be found in ancient poetry.

== In painting ==
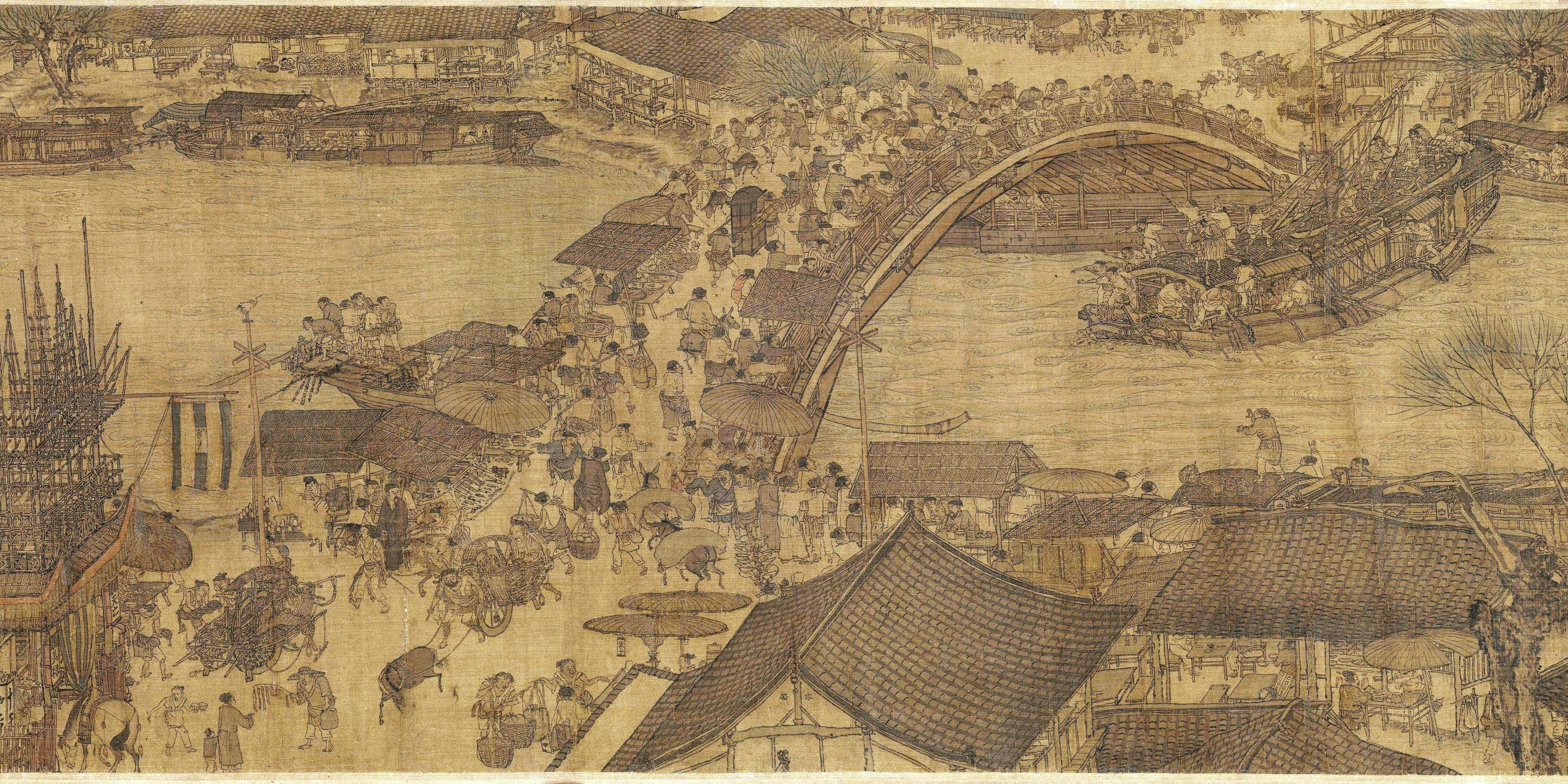
A small section of Along the River During the Qingming Festival

The famous Song dynasty Qingming scroll attributed to Zhang Zeduan may portray Kaifeng city, the capital of the Song dynasty, but does not include any of the activities associated with the holiday, however, and the term "Qingming" may not refer to the holiday.

== In literature ==
Qingming was frequently mentioned in Chinese literature. Among these, the most famous one is probably Du Mu's poem (simply titled "Qingming"):

Traditional Chinese	Simplified Chinese	Pinyin	English translation
清明時節雨紛紛	清明时节雨纷纷	qīng míng shí jié yǔ fēn fēn	Drizzling during Qingming
路上行人欲斷魂	路上行人欲断魂	lù shàng xíng rén yù duàn hún	Travellers on the road seem lifeless
借問酒家何處有	借问酒家何处有	jiè wèn jiǔ jiā hé chù yǒu	Please sir, where can I find a bar
牧童遙指杏花村	牧童遥指杏花村	mù tóng yáo zhǐ xìng huā cūn	A herdsboy pointing to a village afar – the Apricot Flowers.

Although the Qingming Festival is not celebrated in Vietnam, the Qingming Festival is mentioned (under the name Thanh Minh) in the epic poem The Tale of Kieu (which takes place in Ming China during the reign of Jiajing), when the protagonist Thúy Kiều (翠翹) meets a ghost of a dead old lady. The description of the scenery during this festival is one of the best-known passages of Vietnamese literature:

Chữ Nôm	Vietnamese alphabet	English translation
𣈜春昆燕迻梭	Ngày xuân con én đưa thoi	Swift swallows and spring days were shuttling by;
韶光𠃩𨔿㐌外𦒹𨑮	Thiều quang chín chục đã ngoài sáu mươi	Of ninety radiant ones three score had fled.
𦹵𡽫撑羡蹎𡗶	Cỏ non xanh tận chân trời	Young grass spread all its green to heaven's rim;
梗梨𤽸點𱥺𢽼𱽐花	Cành lê trắng điểm một vài bông hoa	Some blossoms marked pear branches with white dots.
清明𥪝節𣎃𠀧	Thanh minh trong tiết tháng ba	Now came the Feast of Light in the third month
禮羅掃墓會羅踏青	Lễ là tảo mộ, hội là đạp thanh	With graveyard rites and junkets on the green.
𧵆賒奴𱕔燕𲍣	Gần xa nô nức yến anh	As merry pilgrims flocked from near and far,
姉㛪懺所步行制春	Chị em sắm sửa bộ hành chơi xuân	The sisters and their brother went for a stroll.

== See also ==
- Along the River During Ching Ming Festival – Painting attributed to Zhang Zeduan by Zhang Zeduan
- Cold Food Festival – Traditional East Asian festival
- Double Ninth Festival – Traditional Chinese holiday
- Ghost Festival – Traditional Buddhist and Taoist festival and Winter Clothes Day

General:

- Traditional Chinese holidays
- Filial piety – Virtue and practice in Chinese classics and society at large in Chinese culture

International:

- All Saints' Day – Christian feast day and All Souls' Day, two Christian observances commemorating the dead
- Day of the Dead – Mexican multi-day holiday, similar to the Qingming Festival
- Bon Festival – Japanese Buddhist custom, the Japanese counterpart of the Ghost Festival
- Hansik, a related Korean holiday on the same day
- Radonitsa / Pomynky – Russian Orthodox commemoration of the departed, a similar holiday of Eastern Slavs
- Parentalia – Roman feast of familias in Roman culture
