= Kusa mochi =

Type of mochi

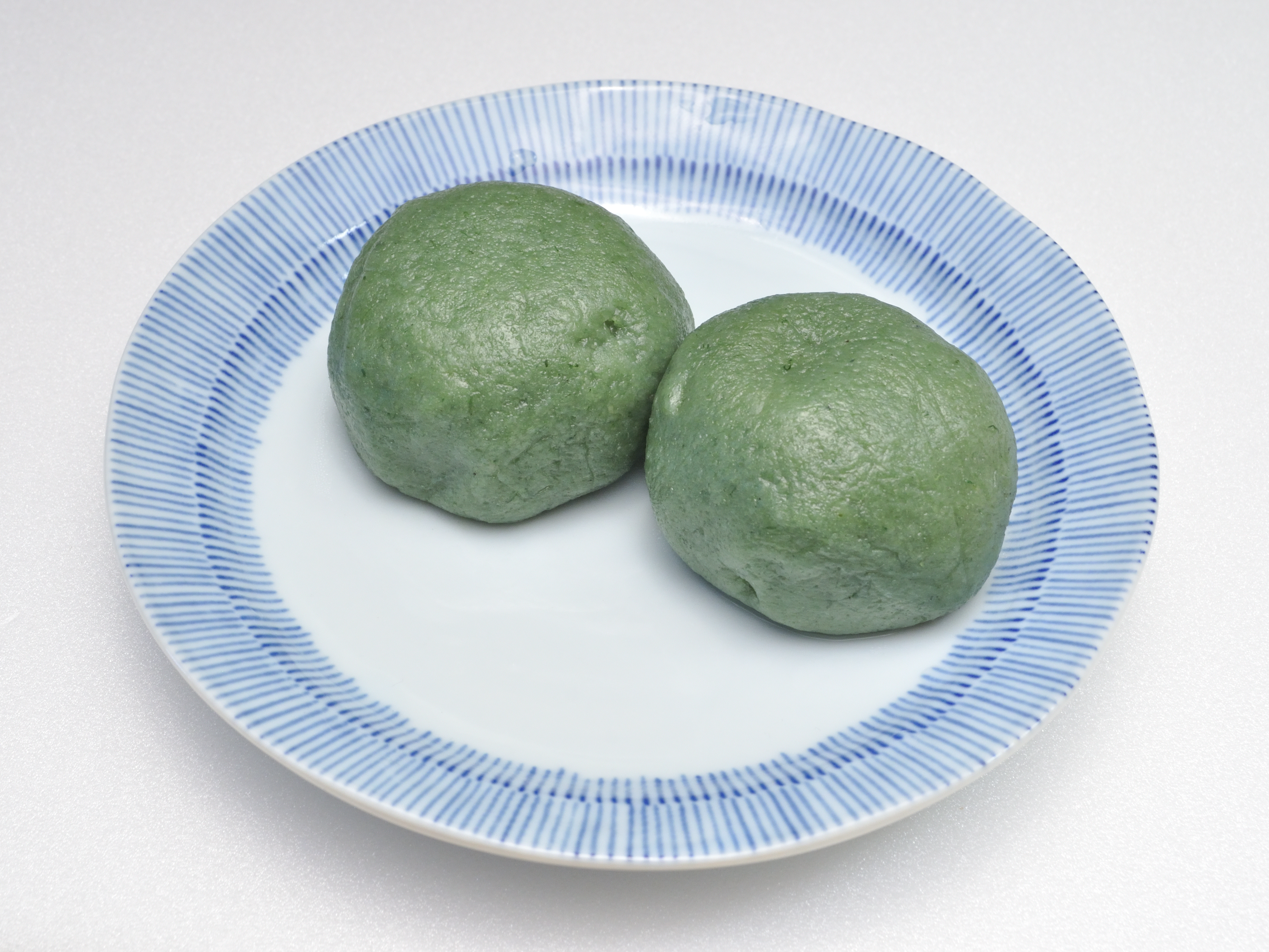
- Alternative names: Yomogi mochi, yomogi dango
- Type: Wagashi
- Course: Dessert
- Place of origin: Japan
- Main ingredients: Mochi, yomogi leaf, red bean paste
- Variations: Qingtuan, Chhau-a-koe, Ssuktteok
- Food energy (per serving): 150 (for 50g)

Kusa mochi (草餅, lit. "herb mochi"), also known as yomogi mochi (蓬餅), is a Japanese confection. It is made from mochi and leaves of yomogi (Japanese mugwort). The leaves are kneaded into the mochi, giving it a vivid green color. The greenness depends on the amount of Japanese mugwort blended in the mochi.

== History ==
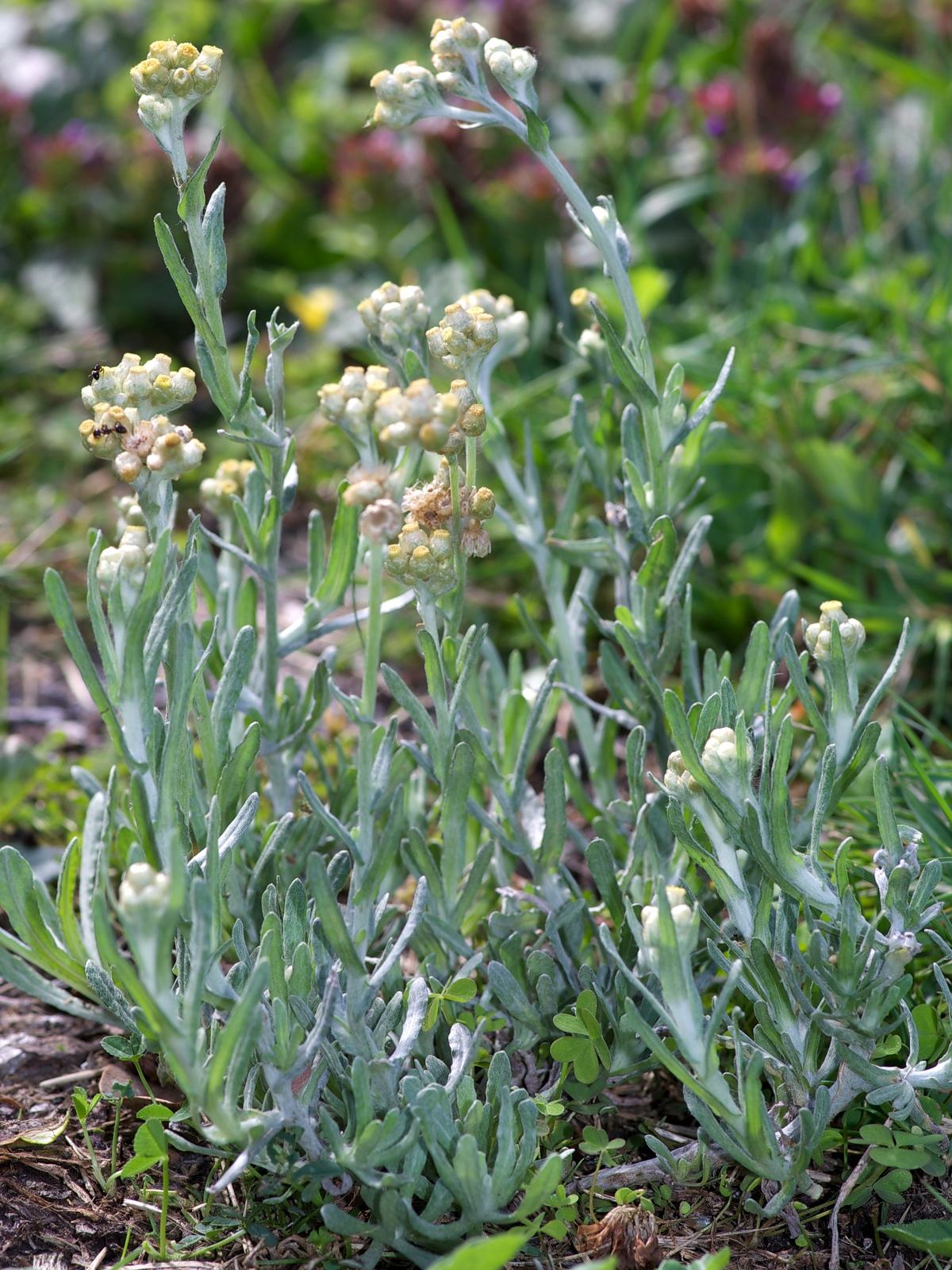
Jersey cudweed

The custom of kneading Japanese mugwort was adopted from the Chinese. Documents state that nobles ate kusa mochi during palace events in the Heian era. It used to be made with Jersey cudweed before the Heian era. Another purported reason for the change in ingredients was because Jersey cudweed is called Haha-ko-gusa which literally translates to "mother-and-child grass". As kusa mochi was eaten with a purpose of wishing for the health and well-being of mother and her children, it was considered ominous to knead jersey cudweed into the mochi.

Since the Edo-era, kusa mochi began to be used as offering for Hinamatsuri (the Girl's Festival). The reason it was chosen as the offering was because of the vivid green color that represents fresh verdure. Japanese mugwort is known for its vitality, which makes it difficult to eradicate. Kusa mochi was used as an offering that wishes health and longevity.

== As medicinal food ==
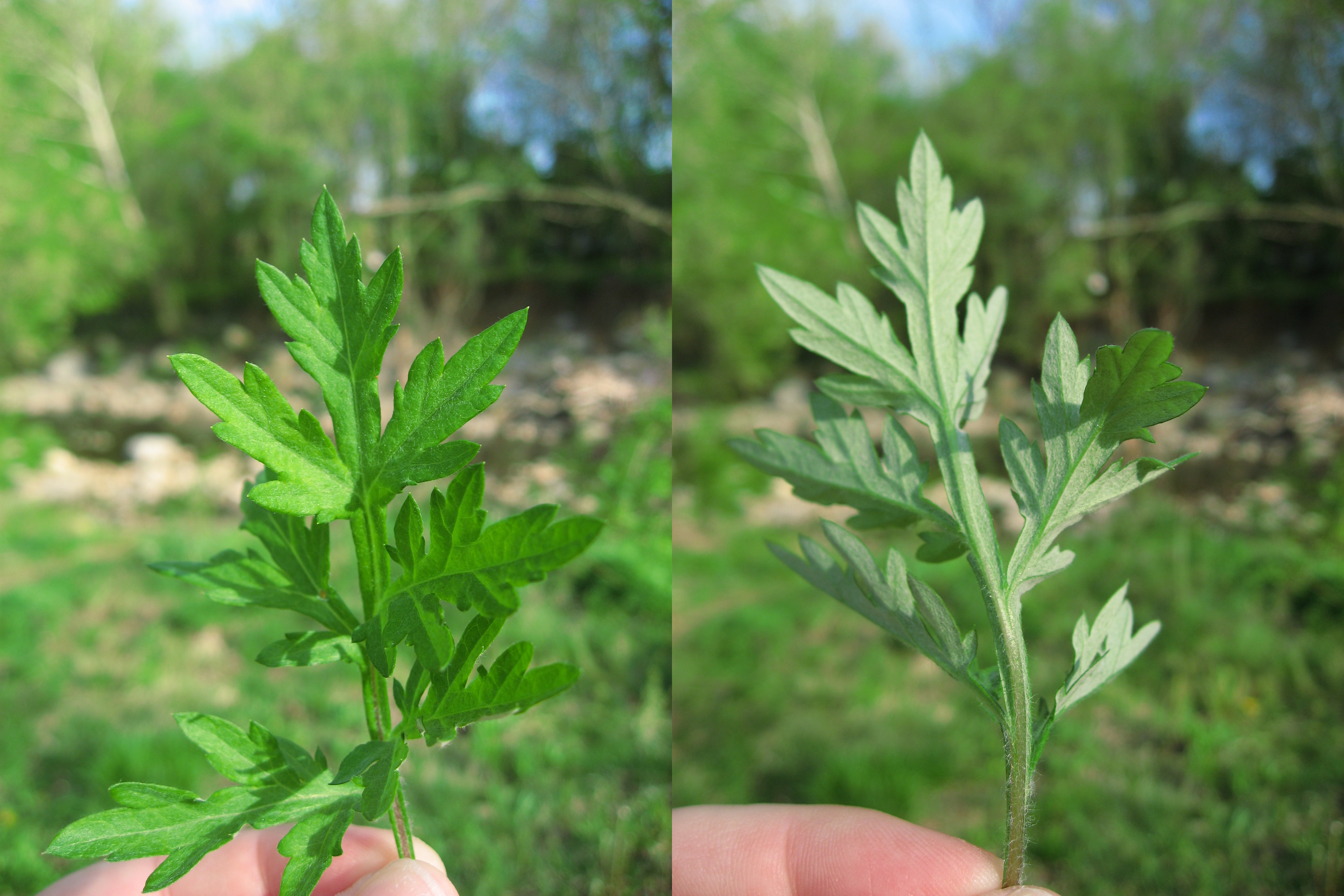
Japanese mugwort (also known as yomogi)

The idea of food being fundamentally connected to medication has been present for a long time. The Japanese mugwort, which is the main ingredient of kusa mochi, has a history of at least 2,500 years of use. In one piece of Japanese ancient literature, it is stated that Japanese mugwort can be used as a hemostatic, a medicine for diarrhea, and for miscarriage prevention, and these uses are still put to practical use today. Research done in by the Hokkaido Tokachi Area Regional Food Processing Technology Center has claimed that Japanese mugwort is effective in improving blood flow.

The Japanese mugwort is a member of the asteraceae plant family, which some people have allergies to.

== Gallery ==
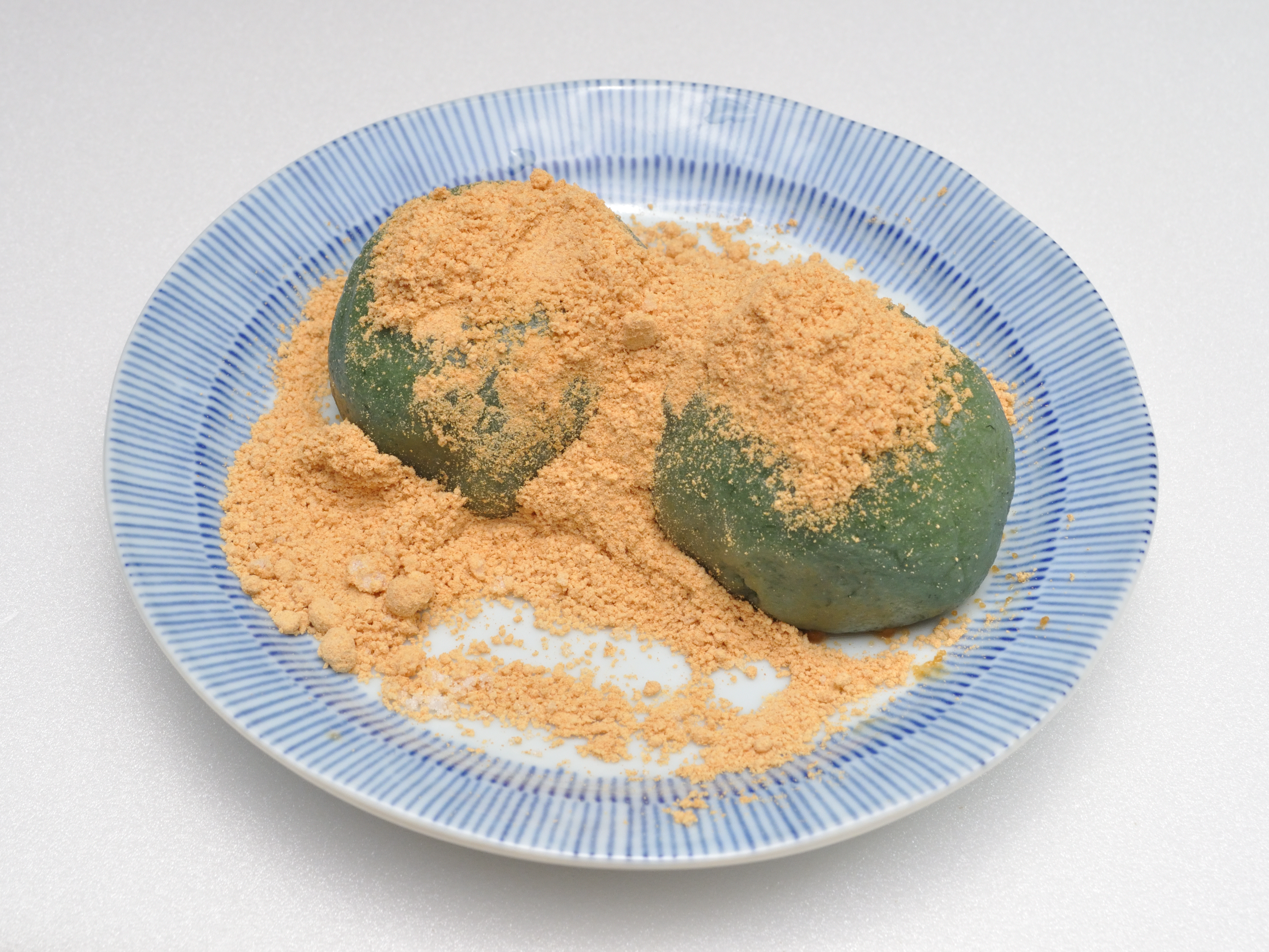
Kusa mochi with kinako powder

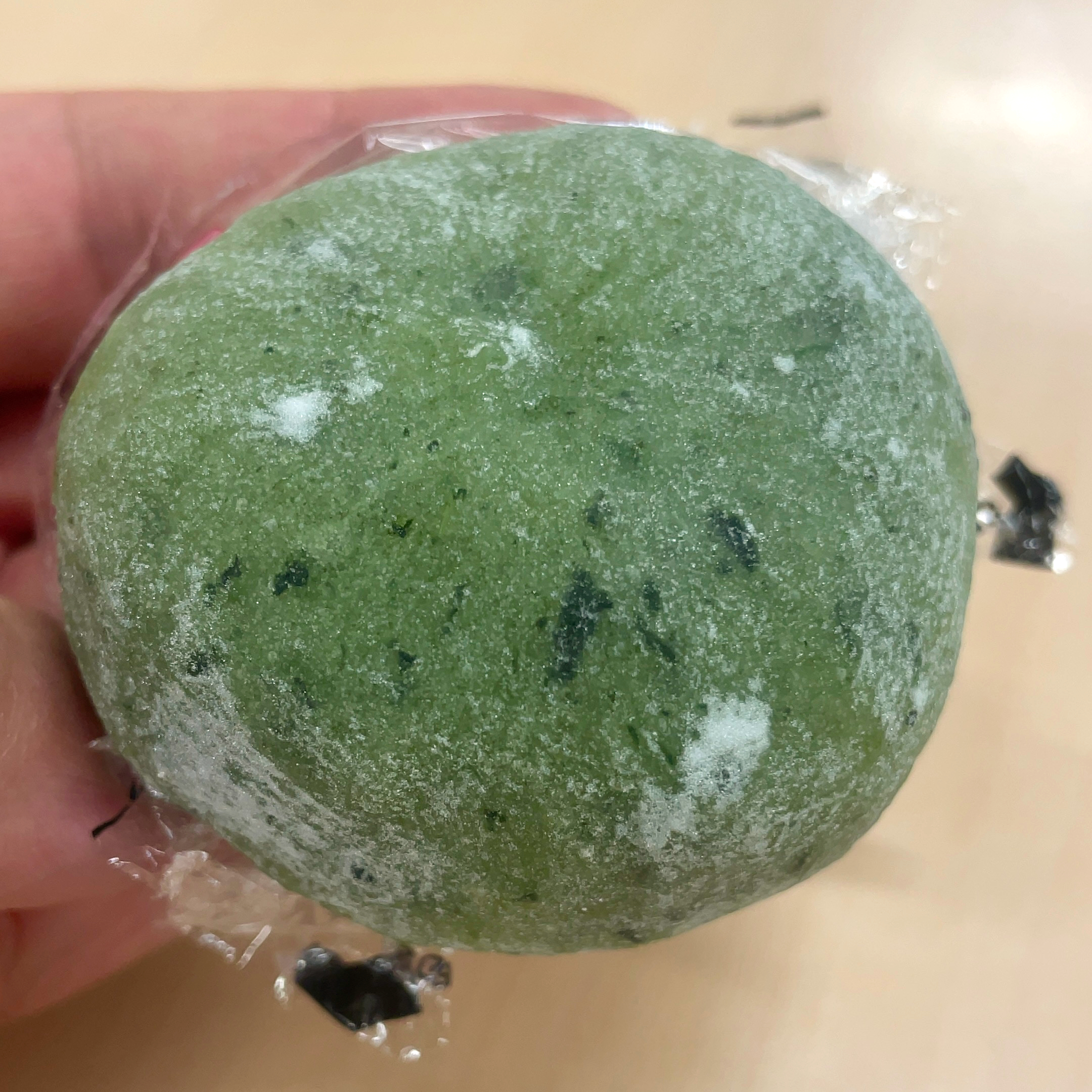
Kusa mochi from a store

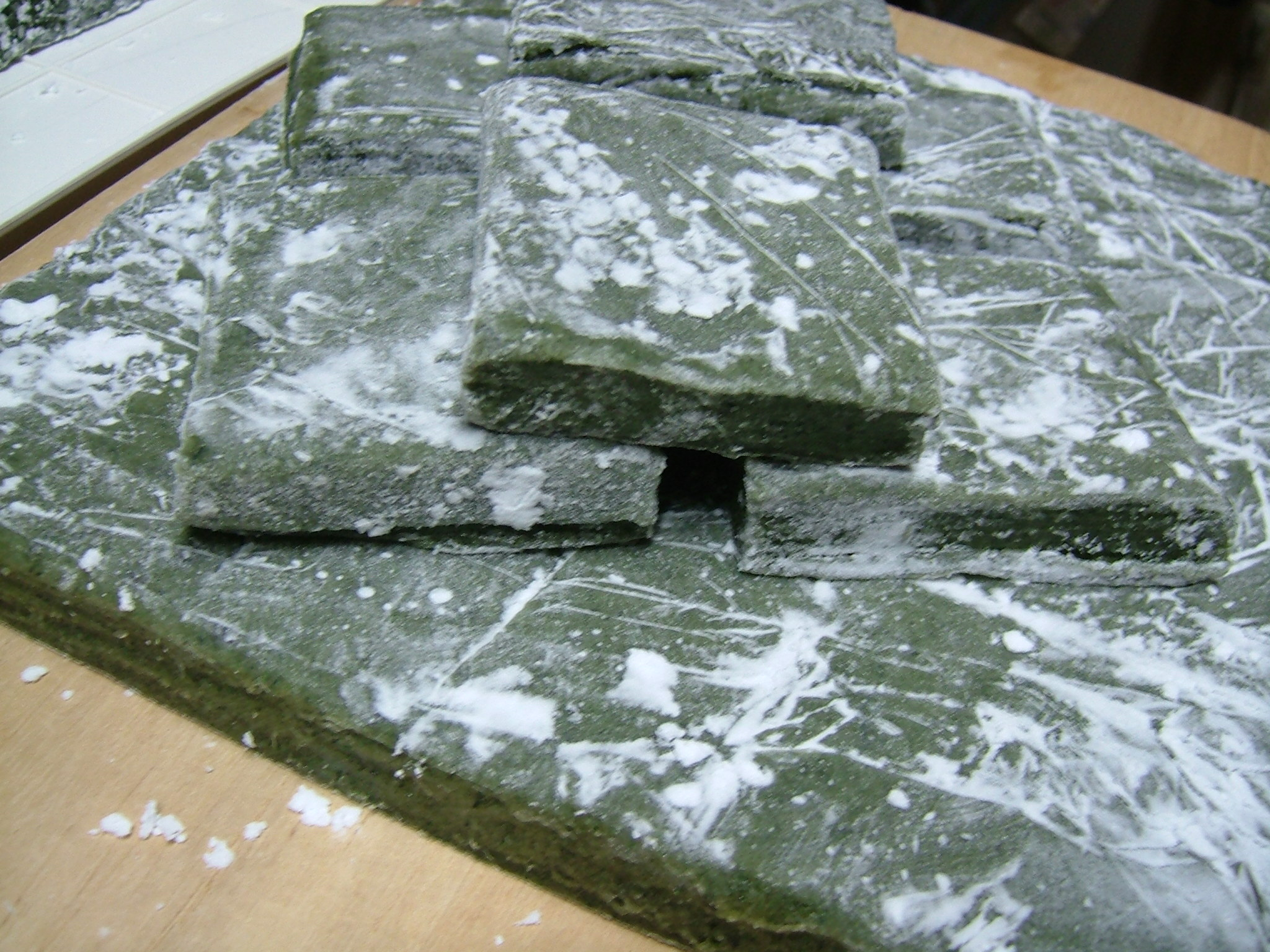
Square cut kusa mochi

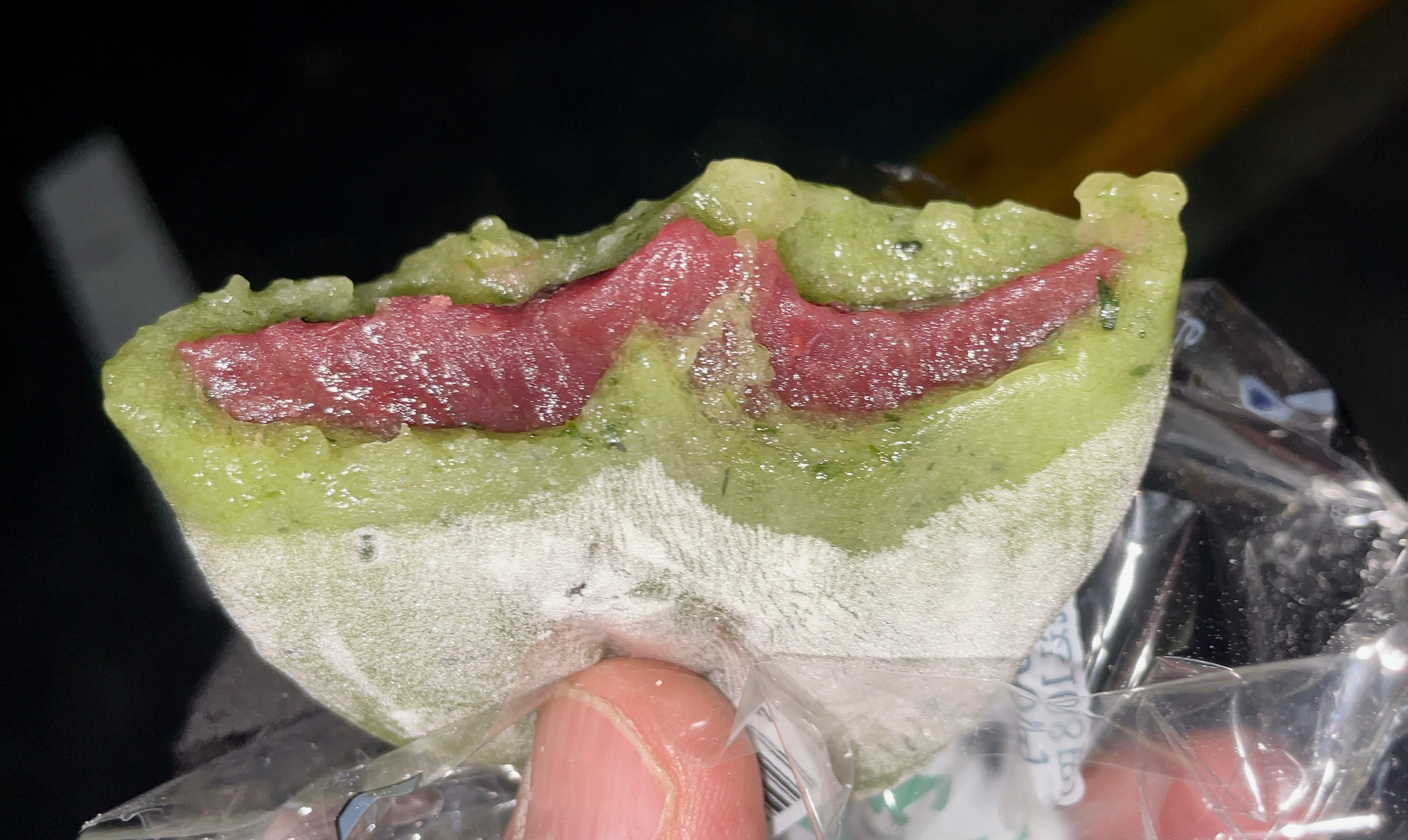
Kusa mochi with anko filling

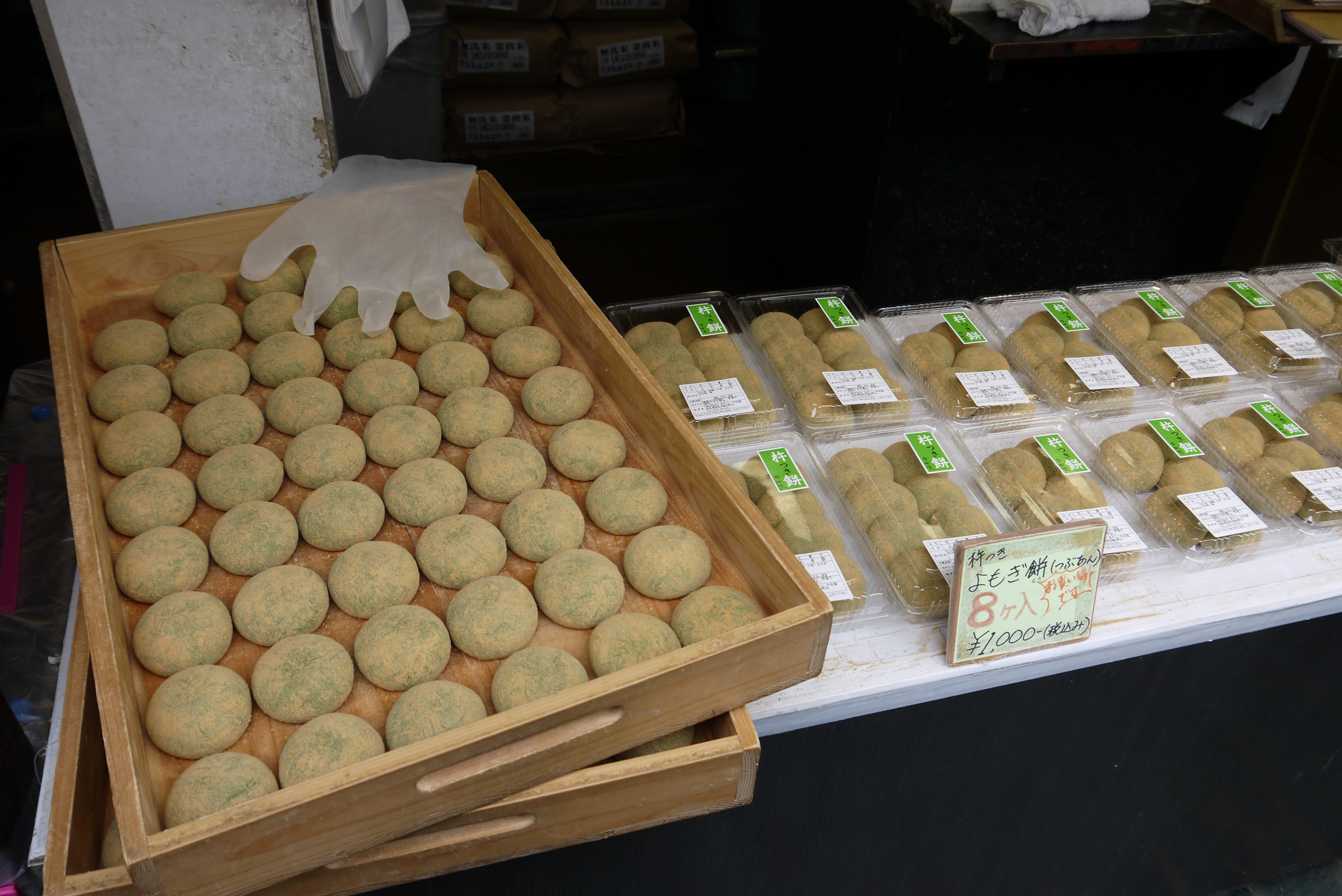

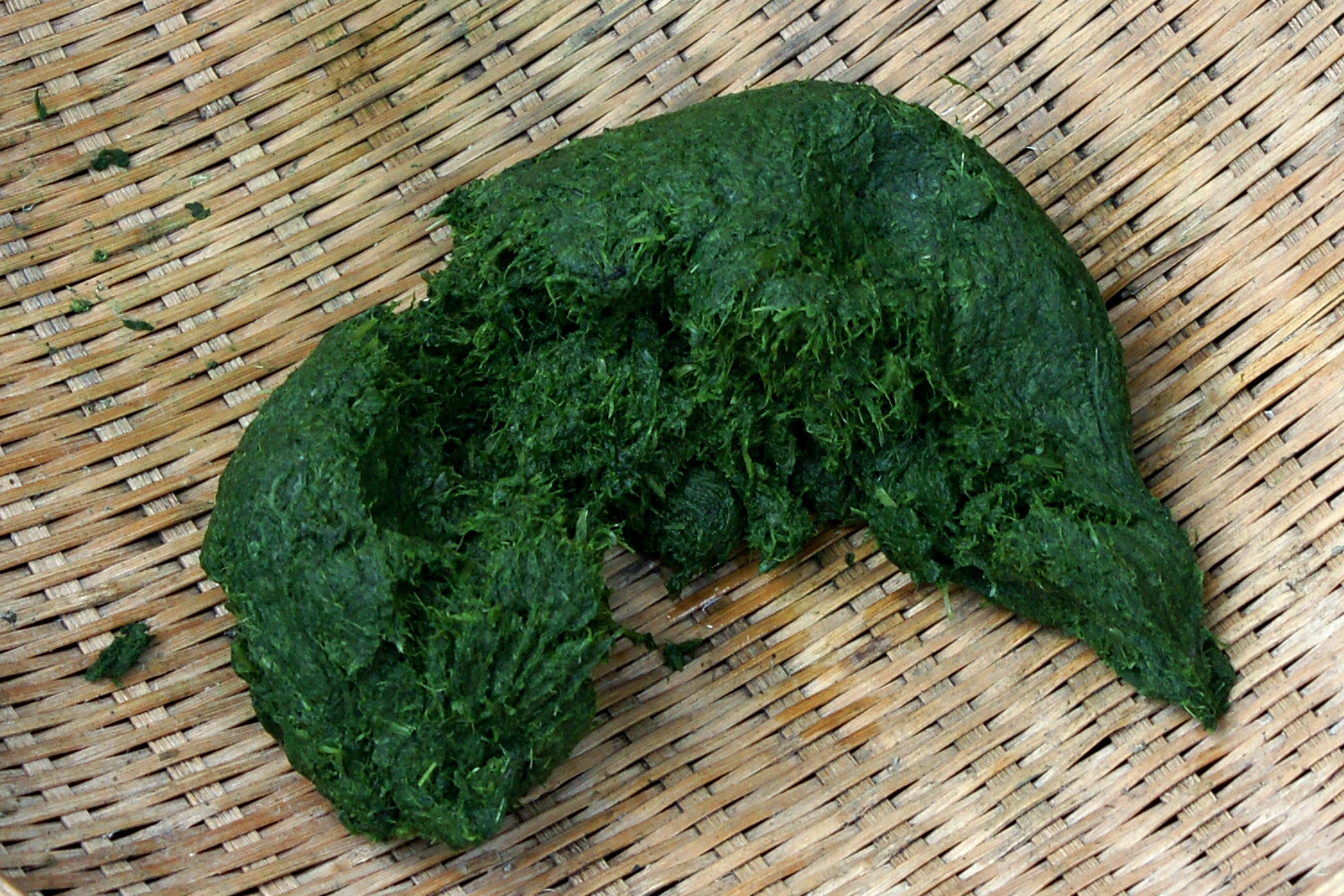
Steamed and mashed yomogi leaves

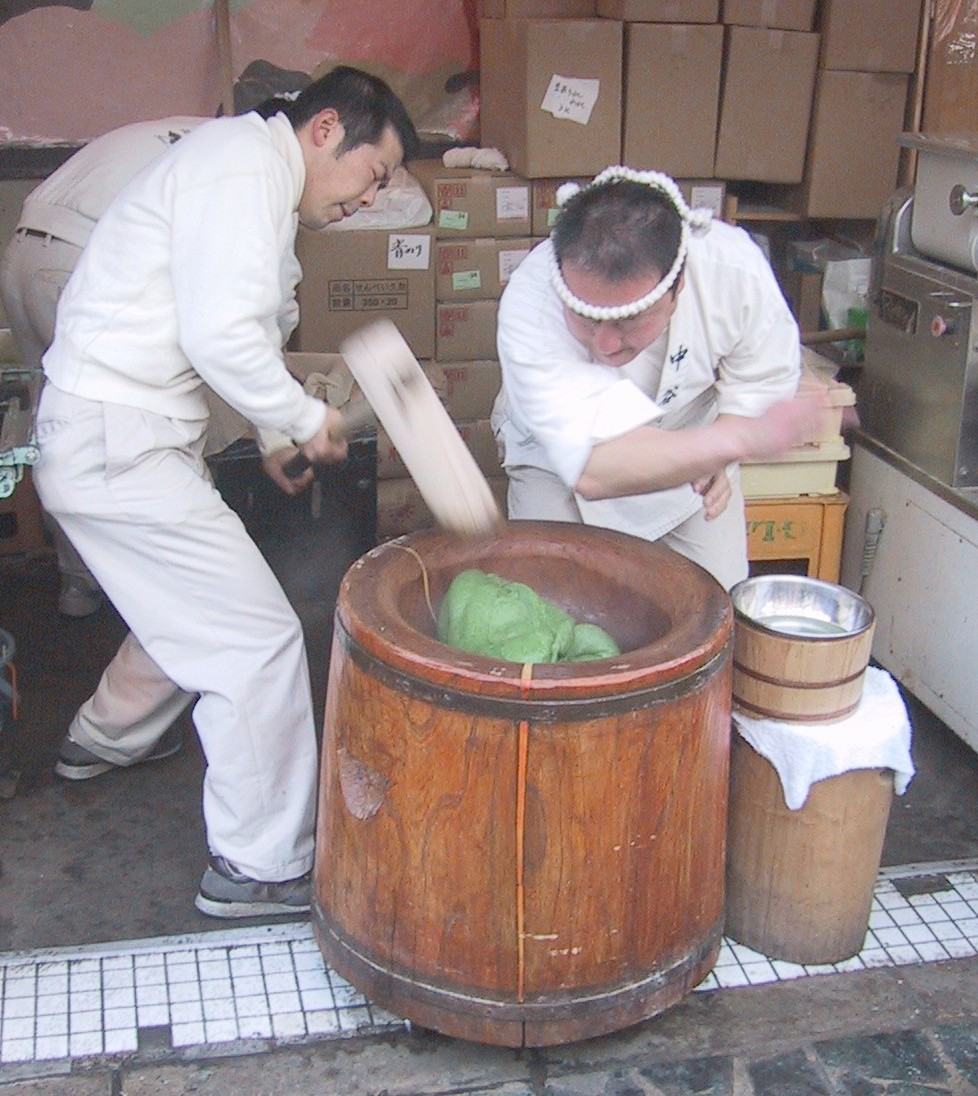
Pounding the mochi

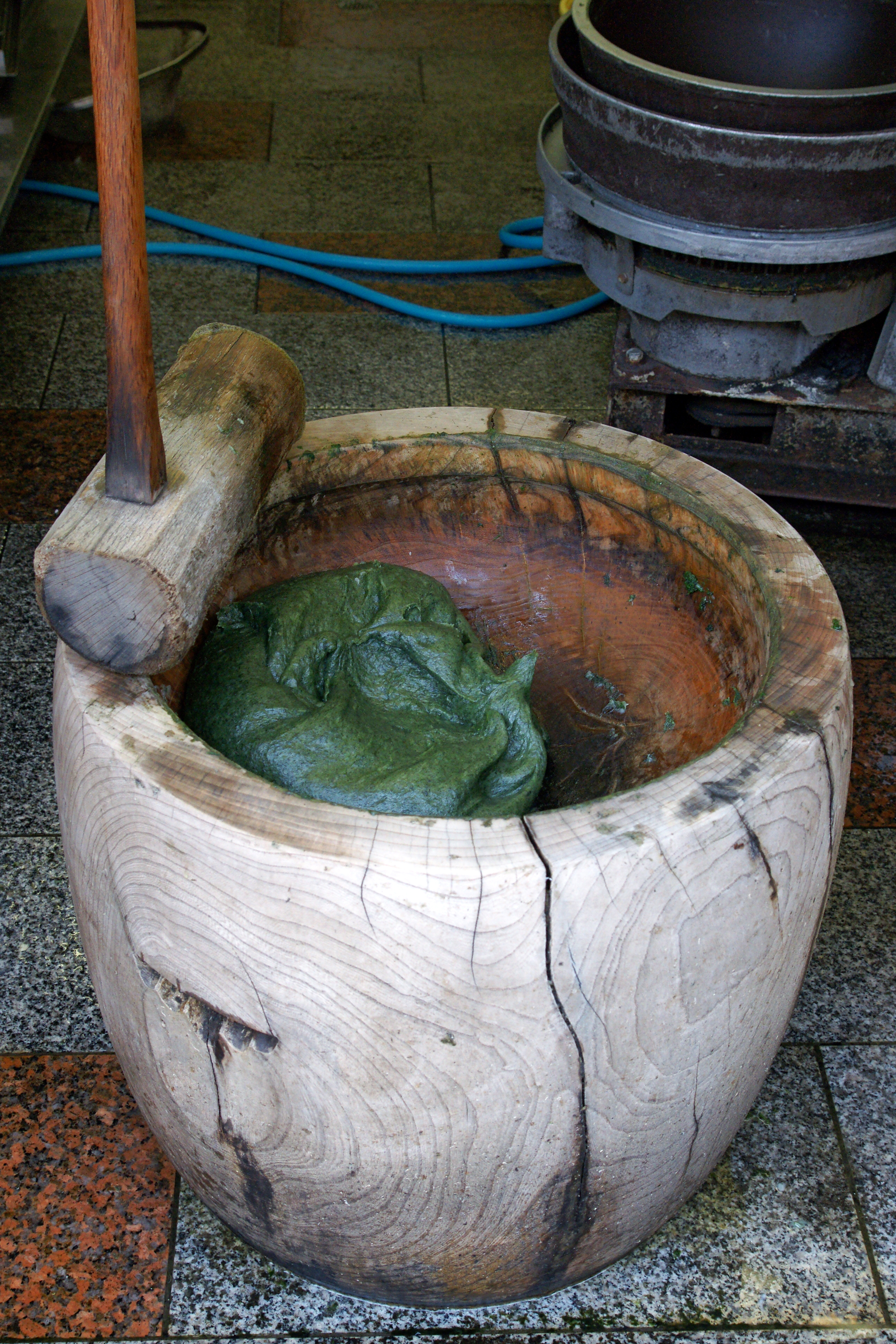
Pounded mochi

== See also ==
- Qingtuan, the original Chinese form of this dish, also consumed during the spring
- Caozai guo, the Fujianese form
