= Boris Petrovich Tokin =

Russian biologist

Boris Petrovich Tokin (Russian: Токин, Борис Петрович; 21 July 1900, in Krychaw – 16 September 1984, in Leningrad) was a Russian biologist known for coining the term phytoncides and promoting and systematizing their use. He also served as chair of the Society of Materialist Biologists and wrote articles integrating the works of Charles Darwin with Marx and Engels.
