= Phytoncide =

Antimicrobial chemical compounds derived from plants

Phytoncides are antimicrobial and insecticidal volatile organic compounds derived from plants. The word, which means "exterminated by the plant" (from the Greek φυτόν "plant" and the Latin caedere"to kill"), was coined in 1928 by Boris P. Tokin, a Soviet biochemist then studying at Moscow State University. He found that some plants give off very active substances that help to prevent them from rotting or from being eaten by some insects and animals.

Phytoncides are a biologically active substance of plant origin that kills or inhibits growth and development of bacteria, microscopic fungi, and protozoa. Phytoncides play an important role in plant immunity and in the relationships between organisms within an ecosystem.

The ability to produce phytoncides is a quality common among plants. The release of phytoncides increase when a plant is injured. Phytoncide compound compositions vary depending on whether the compound is considered a glycoside, terpenoid, or other secondary metabolites.

== Categories ==
There are two categories of phytoncides: 1) nonexcretory phytoncides (found in the protoplasma of cells) and 2) volatile phytoncides (released into the atmosphere, soil and water). Examples of plants with nonexcretory phytoncides are onion, garlic, and horseradish. Examples of plants with volatile phytoncides are pine, oak, eucalyptus, and members of the Sophora genus.

More than 5,000 volatile substances defend plants that protect them from bacteria, fungi, and insects. Phytoncides work by inhibiting or preventing the growth of the attacking organism.

== Function ==
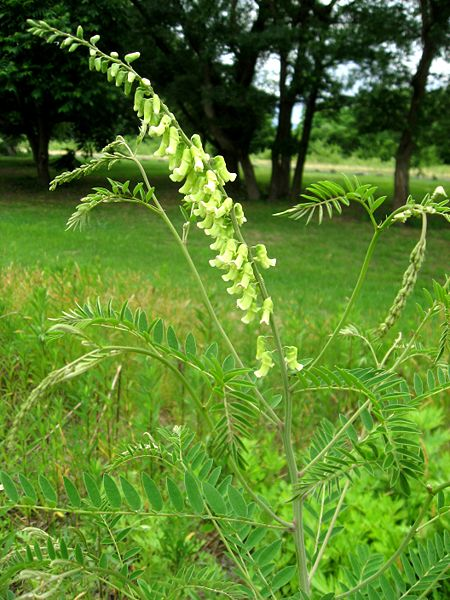
Sophora flavescens

Some phytoncides affect only insects feeding on the plant, acting on the insect's autonomic nervous system. Other phytoncides target mainly microbes. The antimicrobial potency and range of phytoncides vary greatly among species. Some can kill many types of protozoa, bacteria, fungi, and insects within minutes or seconds, while others may take hours or only harm the pest. In addition to acting as a "plant protector", phytoncides can also impede the reproduction of pests.

== Occurrence ==
Cedar, garlic, locust, oak, onion, pine, tea tree, many spices, and many other plants give off phytoncides. Garlic contains allicin and diallyl disulfide. Pine contains alpha-pinene, carene, myrcene, and other terpenes. Sophora flavescens contains sophoraflavanone G.

== Uses ==
=== Environment ===
One hectare of pine forest releases approximately 5 kg of volatile phytoncides into the atmosphere daily, reducing the population of microflora in the air and essentially sterilizing the forest atmosphere, which contains only about 200–300 bacterial cells/m^{3}. This effect is found more commonly in coniferous forests than deciduous forests.

=== Other ===
Because of the antimicrobial properties of phytoncides, research has investigated potential use in medicine, as a plant protector in greenhouses, and in the shipping and storing of perishable fruits and vegetables.

One volatile phytoncide, sophoraflavanone G, is of particular interest due to its potential for use against methicillin-resistant Staphylococcus aureus (MRSA) and vancomycin-resistant Enterococcus bacteria.

Phytoncides are used in Ukrainian, Korean, Chinese, and Japanese traditional medicine, as well as in alternative medicine, aromatherapy, and veterinary medicine.

== See also ==
- Plant defense against herbivory § Chemical defenses
- Allelopathy
