= Chinese mugwort =

Chinese mugwort is a common name for several plants and may refer to:

- Artemisia argyi
- Artemisia verlotiorum
