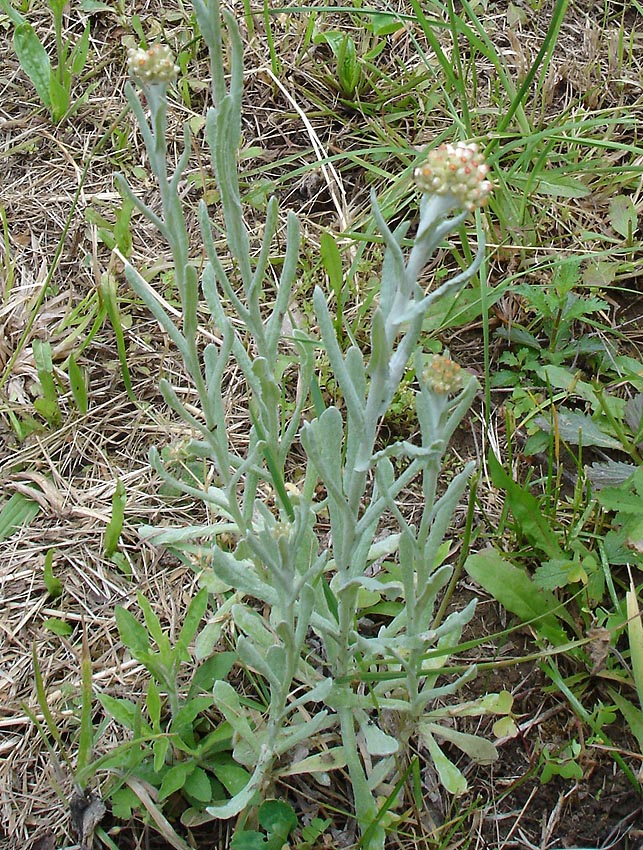

Scientific classification
- Kingdom: Plantae
- Clade: Tracheophytes
- Clade: Angiosperms
- Clade: Eudicots
- Clade: Asterids
- Order: Asterales
- Family: Asteraceae
- Genus: Pseudognaphalium
- Species: P. luteoalbum

Binomial name
- Pseudognaphalium luteoalbum (L.) Hilliard & B.L.Burtt

Synonyms
- Synonyms list: Dasyanthus conglobatus; Bubani, nom. superfl.; Filaginella luteoalba; (L.) Opiz; Gnaphalium alboluteum; Roxb.; Gnaphalium conglobatum; Lam., nom. superfl.; Gnaphalium depressum; Steud., nom. superfl.; Gnaphalium diffusum; Baker; Gnaphalium gracile; Blume; Gnaphalium javanum; DC.; Gnaphalium leontopodinum; Bory ex DC.; Gnaphalium luteoalbum; L.; Gnaphalium luteolum; E.H.L.Krause; Gnaphalium martabanicum; Wall.; Gnaphalium molle; Salisb.; Gnaphalium orixense; Roxb.; Gnaphalium pallidum; Lam.; Gnaphalium pompejanum; Ten.; Gnaphalium reinwardtianum; Miq.; Gnaphalium sphaericum; Perr. ex DC.; Gnaphalium trifidum; Thunb.; Helichrysum conglomeratum; Moench; Helichrysum luteoalbum; (L.) Rchb.; Laphangium luteoalbum; (L.) Tzvelev; Pseudognaphalium luteoalbum subsp. turcicum; Yıld.

= Pseudognaphalium luteoalbum =

Species of flowering plant

Pseudognaphalium luteoalbum, synonyms including Helichrysum luteoalbum, is a species of flowering plant in the family Asteraceae. In the United Kingdom, it is known as the Jersey cudweed.

== Description ==
It is an erect herbaceous biennial up to 70 cm (28 in) tall, branching from the base. Leaves are oblanceolate to lanceolate and covered in hairs like that of the edelweiss. The leaves can survive freezing in winter. Flowers are cream, yellow, white, or pink. Seeds have a pappus which lets them float over long distances.

== Taxonomy ==
This species was first published by Carl Linnaeus in his 1753 Species plantarum, under the name Gnaphalium luteo-album (the orthography was later changed to omit the hyphen). In 1829, Ludwig Reichenbach transferred it to Helichrysum, but this name was not taken up, and the species was retained in Gnaphalium until 1981, when Olive Mary Hilliard and Brian Laurence Burtt transferred it into Pseudognaphalium.

In 2004, an investigation into the phylogenetic relationships of Helichrysum and related genera found this species to have arisen within Helichrysum. As a result of this, Reichenbach's long-forgotten name for this species was resurrected. A later study suggested that all the sampled Pseudognaphalium species arose within Helichrysum as did Anaphalis, Achyrocline and Humeocline. Subsequent phylogenetic studies showed that Helichrysum, Anaphalis and Pseudognaphalium formed a clade, but retained these genera.

The botanical Latin specific epithet luteoalbum translates as 'pale yellow'.

== Distribution and habitat ==
This species is so widely distributed that it is unclear where it is native and where naturalised. In general it is considered naturalised in North and South America, and native to every other continent except Antarctica. It grows in meadows, wastelands, and edges of forests. Its rosettes are occasionally mistaken for edelweiss.

== Uses ==
In Vietnam, the plant is used as a food ingredient, such as in the rice cake banh khuc. It has also been used in traditional medicine of the region, as a diuretic, hemostatic, antipyretic, for the treatment of cough, and for pain relief.

== See also ==
- Nanakusa-no-sekku
