= Kremenets =

City in Ternopil Oblast, Ukraine

Kremenets Кременець
- City
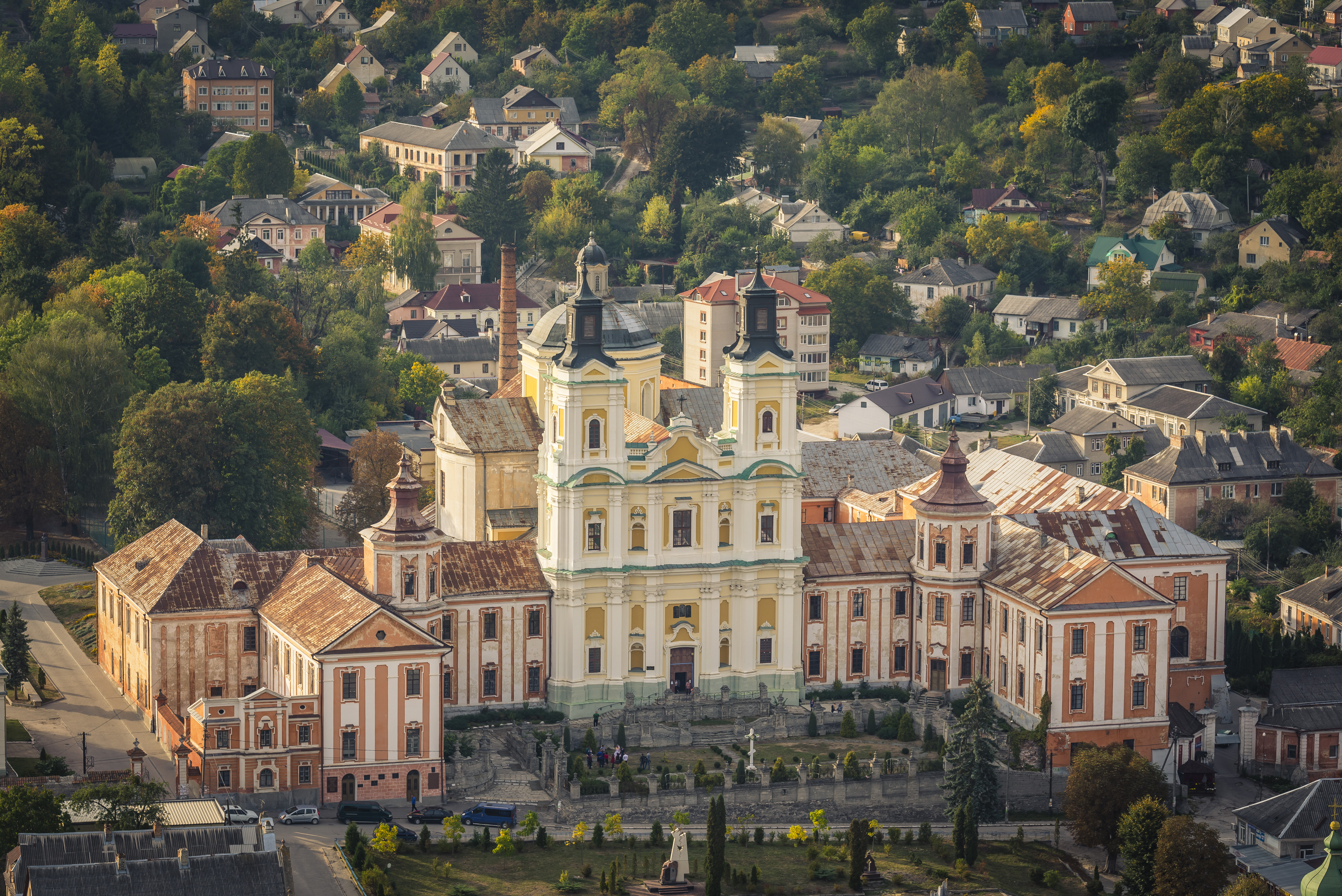
- Kremenets panorama from the Castle Hill

- Flag Coat of arms
- Interactive map of Kremenets
- Kremenets in Ternopil Oblast Kremenets (Ukraine)
- Coordinates: 50°06′29″N 25°43′39″E
- Country: Ukraine
- Oblast: Ternopil Oblast
- Raion: Kremenets Raion
- Hromada: Kremenets urban hromada
- Established: 1227

Area
  - Total: 20.76 km^{2} (8.02 sq mi)

Population (2022)
  - Total: 20 476
  - Density: 0.96/km^{2} (2.5/sq mi)
- Time zone: UTC+2
  - Summer (DST): UTC+3
- Postal code: 47000 - 47009

Kremenets (Ukrainian: Кременець, IPA: [ˈkrɛmenetsʲ]; Polish: Krzemieniec; Yiddish: קרעמעניץ, romanized: Kremenits) is a city in Ternopil Oblast, western Ukraine. It is the administrative center of the Kremenets Raion, and lies 18 kilometres (11 mi) north-east of the Pochaiv Lavra. The city is situated in the historic region of Volhynia and features the 12th-century Kremenets Castle. It hosts the administration of Kremenets urban hromada, one of the hromadas of Ukraine. Population: 20,476 (2022 estimate).

== History ==
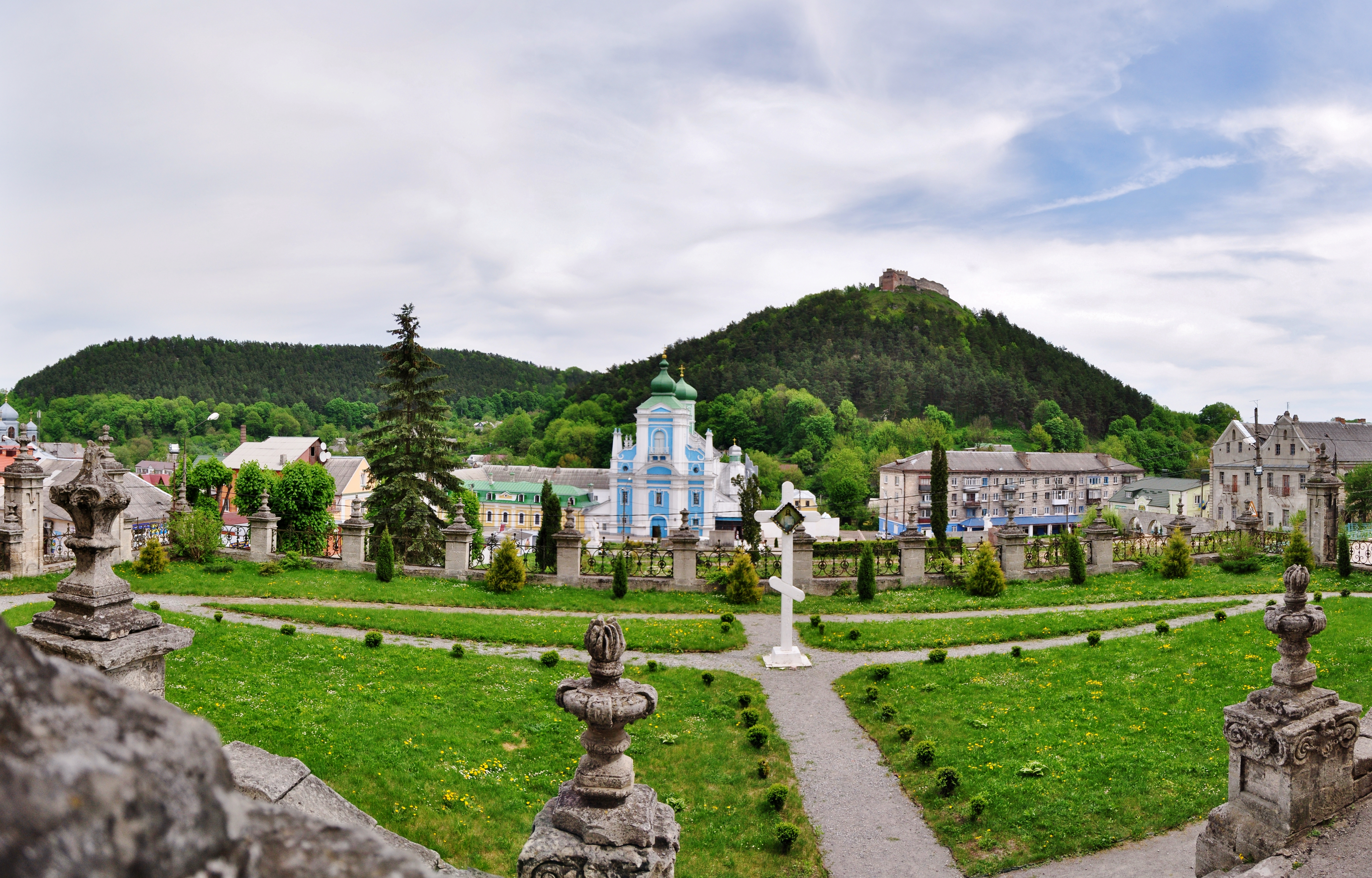
Former Franciscan abbey and the castle on Bona Hill

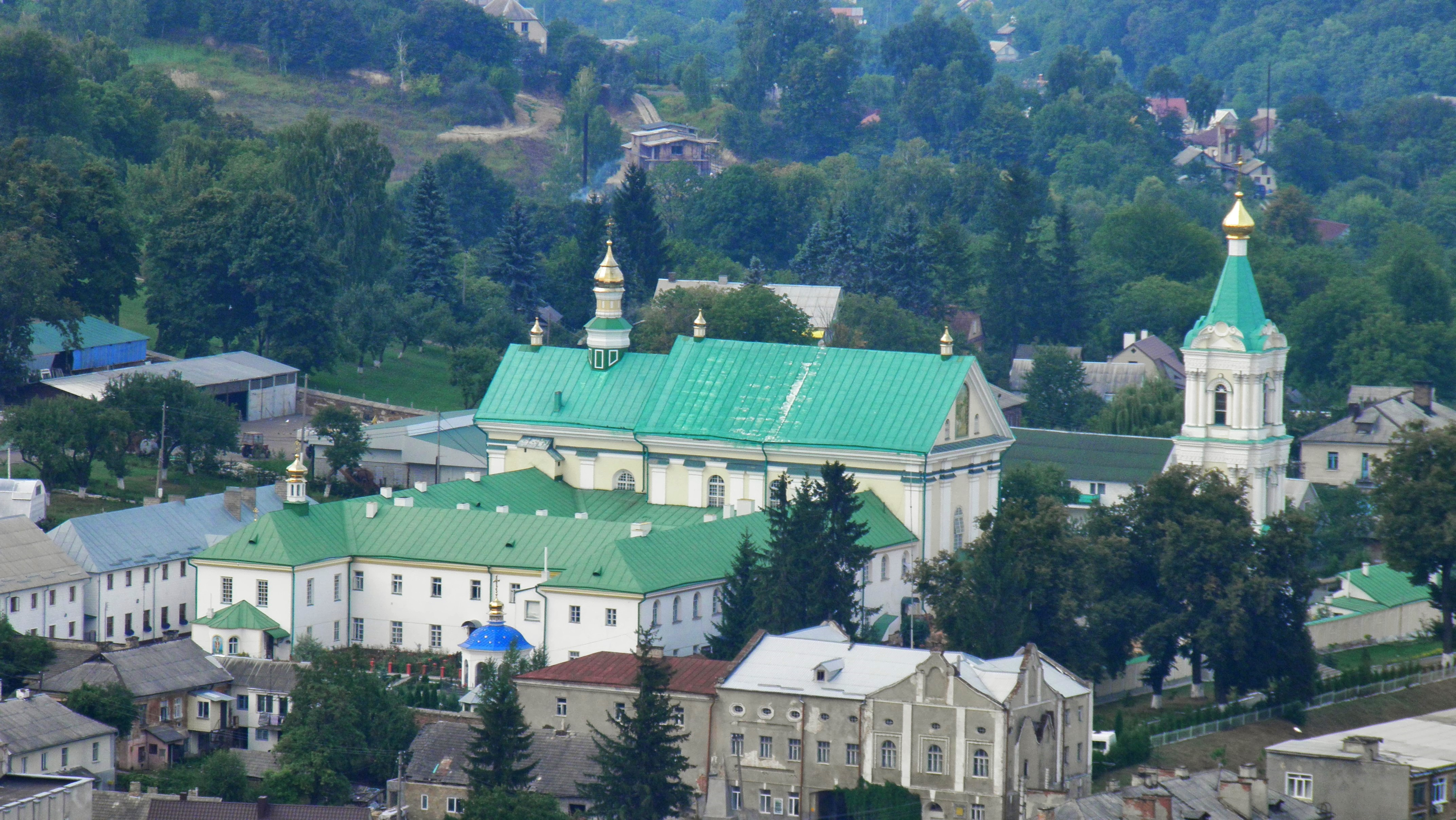
Epiphany Convent

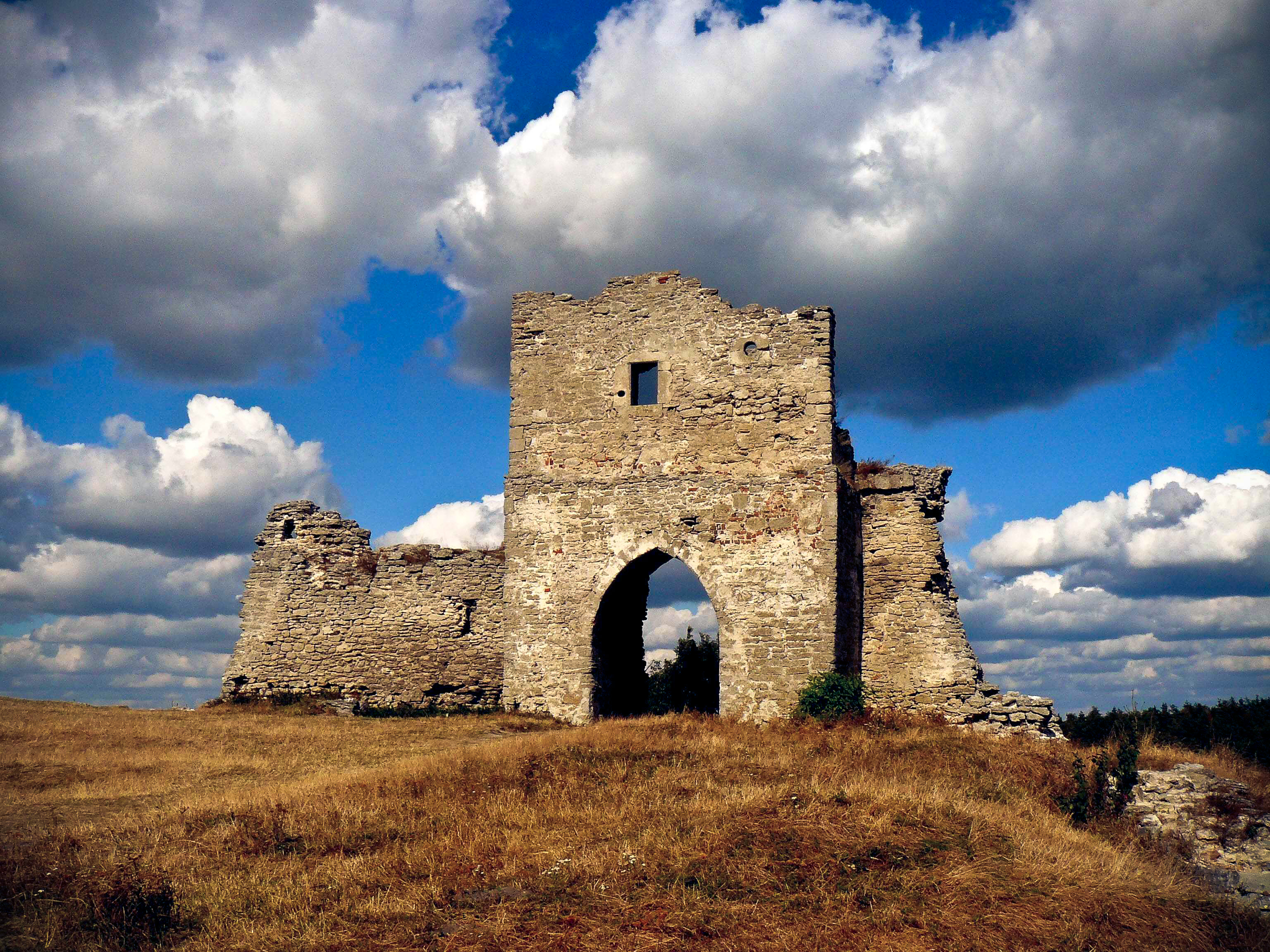
Kremenets Castle

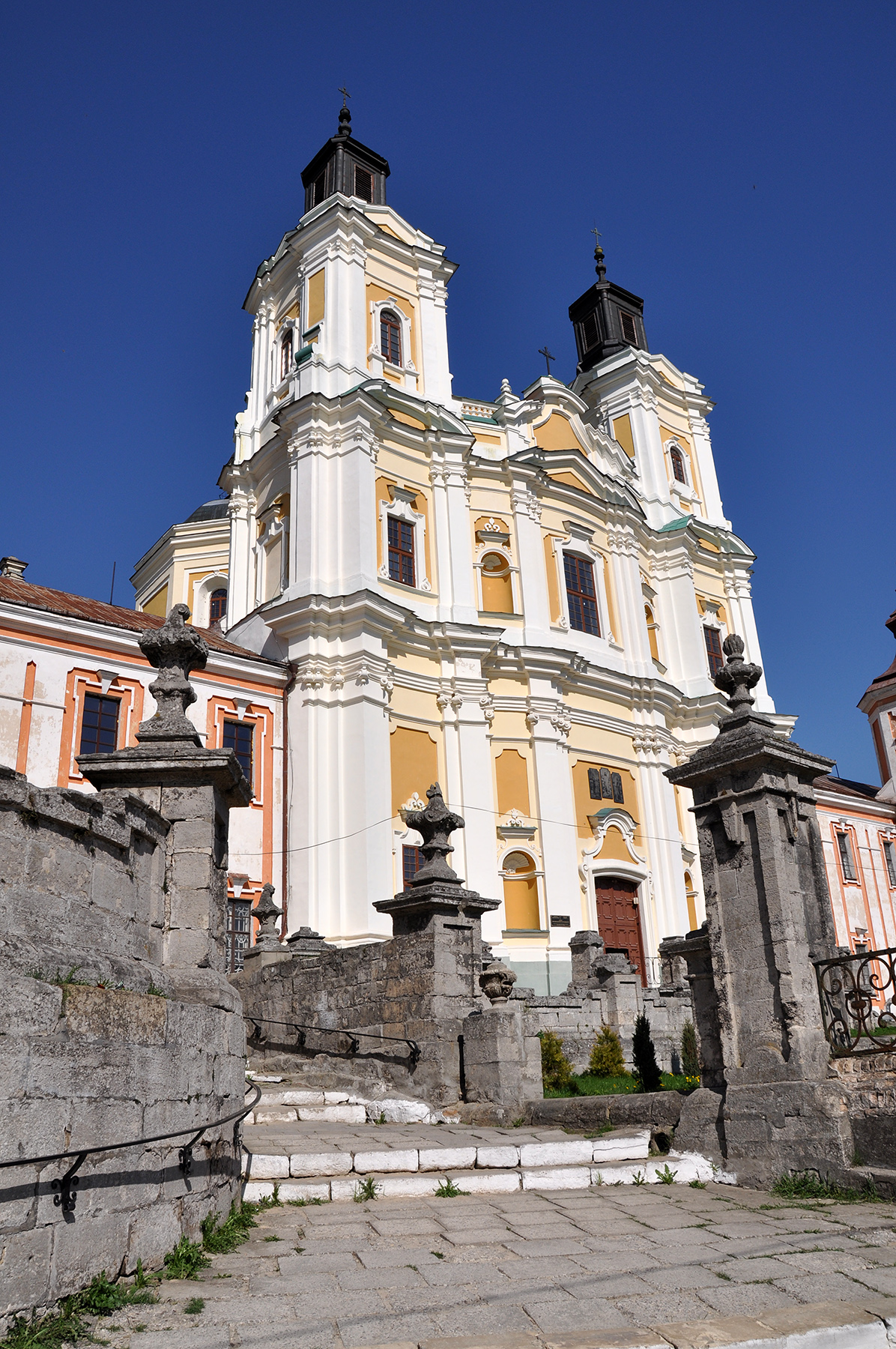
Saint Ignatius Loyola Church

According to some sources the Kremenets fortress was built in the 8th or 9th century, and later became a part of Kievan Rus'. The first documented reference to the fortress is given in a Polish encyclopedic dictionary written in 1064. The first reference to Kremenets in Old Slavic literature dates from 1226 when the city's ruler, Mstislav the Bold, defeated the Hungarian army of King Andrew II nearby. During the Mongol invasion of Rus' in 1240–1241, Kremenets was one of few cities that Batu Khan failed to capture. In 1382, after the death of Louis I of Hungary, Lithuanian duke Liubartas captured Kremenets from the Kingdom of Hungary. The city obtained Magdeburg rights in 1431, and in 1569, after the Union of Lublin, it became part of Crown of Poland, known as Polish: Krzemieniec.

In the fall of 1648 Cossack Colonel Maxym Kryvonis surrounded the Kremenets fortress. In October, after a six-week siege, the royal garrison surrendered. As a consequence of the fighting, the fortress was severely damaged and was never rebuilt.

In 1795 Kremenets was annexed by the Russian Empire following the Third Partition of the Polish-Lithuanian Commonwealth. It was a town in Kremenetsky Uyezd of the Volhynian Governorate of the Russian Empire until World War I.

During 1917-1920 Kremenets 7 times passed from hand to hand. The authorities Ukrainian state – Ukrainian People's Republic – it was subject to early 1918 to June 1919.

In 1921, following Peace of Riga, the town returned to Poland, and was part of Volhynian Voivodeship (Wołyń) .

In the interwar period, Kremenets was famous for its renowned high school, Liceum Krzemienieckie, founded in 1803 by Tadeusz Czacki. According to the 1931 Polish census, the town had a population of 19,877, with 8,428 Ukrainians, 6,904 Jews, 3,108 Poles and 883 Russians. In 1934, upon initiative of Ludwik Gronowski, teacher of the Kremenets High School, Volhynian School of Gliding Sokola Góra (Wołyńska Szkoła Szybowcowa Sokola Góra) was opened 14 kilometers from Kremenets, in the village of Kulików. Among its students was the daughter of Jozef Piłsudski, Jadwiga Piłsudska.

In September 1939, the Polish government was temporarily located in Kremenets, which during this time was subject to heavy aerial bombing until captured by invading Soviet forces on 17 September. By then the government had evacuated Kremenets and was on its way to neutral Romania.

On July 28, 1941, most of the teachers of the Krzemieniec High School were arrested by the Germans, who used a list provided to them by local Ukrainians. By the end of the month, 30 teachers and members of Polish intelligentsia were murdered at the so-called Hill of Crosses (Góra Krzyżów).

In January 1989 the population was 24 570 people.

During the restoration of Ukrainian statehood in 1991, was restored Kremenets Botanical Garden (1991), created Kremenetsko-Pochaivskiy State Historical-Architectural Reserve (2001), opened Kremenetskiy Regional Humanitarian Pedagogical Institute n. Shevchenko (2002), Kremenetskiy Regional Museum Juliusz Slowacki (2003), increasing the flow of tourists. In 1991 at the Teachers College Shevchenko created a modern Kremenets Lyceum.

Until 18 July 2020, Kremenets was designated as a city of oblast significance and did not belong to Kremenets Raion even though it was the center of the raion. As part of the administrative reform of Ukraine, which reduced the number of raions of Ternopil Oblast to three, the city was merged into Kremenets Raion.

== Jews of Kremenets ==
Jews are known to have settled in the Kremenets area as early as 1438, when the Grand Duke of Lithuania gave them a charter. However, in 1495, Lithuania expelled its Jews until 1503. A Polish Yeshiva, however, operated in Kremenets during the 15th and 16th centuries.

The Jewish community expanded and prospered through the 16th century. Around the middle of the century, rabbinical representatives of the Qahals of Poland began gathering at the great Fairs to conduct the business of the Jewish communities. These conferences became known as the Council of the Four Lands. Volhynian representatives were from Ostroh and Kremenets.

Khmelnytsky's Cossack uprising against the Polish land owners from 1648 through 1651, followed by the Russian-Swedish wars against Poland-Lithuania from 1654 to 1656, devastated the Jewish population of western Ukraine. Many Jews, many of whom were stewards of magnates, were murdered, while others fled. Jews were not allowed to rebuild their destroyed homes. Kremenets never again regained its former importance. All that was left as the Russians took control in 1793 was "an impoverished community of petty traders and craftsmen."

In 1747, Kremenets was the site of a well-publicized blood libel trial in which 14 Jews were accused of murdering a Christian to obtain blood for making matzo – a false accusation dating back to the Middle Ages. The incident began when an unidentified corpse was found near an inn and curious townsfolk gathered around to view the body. When some Jews joined the crowd, the corpse supposedly began to bleed, thus supernaturally demonstrating their guilt. Twelve of the Jews confessed under torture (placed on the rack and burned with red-hot irons). Most were gruesomely executed by being flayed, quartered and impaled while still alive, by orders of the Christian civil authorities.

Jewish life gradually revived and Kremenets became a secondary center of Haskalah (enlightenment) in Eastern Europe in the period 1772 through 1781. By the end of the 19th century, Jews once again were active in the economic life of the town, primarily in the paper industry and as cobblers and carpenters. They exported their goods to other towns in Russia and Poland. Under Polish rule, in the early 1930s, two Yiddish periodicals were published. They merged in 1933 into a single weekly newspaper, Kremenitser Lebn (Kremenets Life).

The Soviet authorities annexed the town on September 22, 1939. In the spring of 1940, the refugees from western Poland were obliged to register with the authorities and to declare whether they wished to take up Soviet citizenship or return to their former homes, now under German occupation. Jewish communal life was forbidden, and Zionist leaders were forced to move to other cities to keep their past activities from the knowledge of the authorities. By 1941 the Jewish population had increased to over 15,000 including over 4,000 refugees.

=== Holocaust ===
The Nazis destroyed the Jewish community of Kremenets. Except for those who left Kremenets before the war and 14 survivors, all 15,000 Jews who lived in Kremenets in 1941 were murdered.

In June 1941, the German Einsatzgruppe "C" carried out a mass slaughter of Jews in the Generalbezirk Wolhynien-Podolien District, which was part of Reichskommissariat Ukraine. The District included all of Volhynia.

"A few days after the German-Soviet war broke out (June 22, 1941) the Germans reached the area. Hundreds of young Jews managed to flee to the Soviet Union. A pogrom broke out in early July 1941, where 800 men, women and children were killed. In August 1941 the Gestapo ordered all Jews with academic status to report for registration. All those who did so were murdered, and the Jewish community's leadership was destroyed. That month the Germans set fire to the main synagogue and exacted a fine of 11 kg. of gold from the community.

A Judenrat was imposed. The head, Benjamin Katz was murdered for his refusal to collaborate with the Nazis. At the end of January 1942 a ghetto was established and on March 1 was closed off from the rest of the city. The inmates endured great hardship and there was a serious shortage of water.

In the summer of 1942, the Germans began the systematic liquidation of the ghettos in the provincial towns. On July 22, 1942, there was armed resistance by the Jews of the Kremenets ghetto against the Germans.

On August 10, 1942, the Germans initiated a two-week-long Aktion to annihilate the Jews of the Kremenets Ghetto, Fifteen hundred able-bodied persons were dispatched as slave laborers to Bilokrynytsia, where they later met their death. The vast majority of the ghetto inhabitants were rounded up and taken to trenches dug near a former army camp, and murdered. The Germans set the ghetto ablaze to drive out those in hiding. Societies of former residents of Kremenets function in Israel, the United States and Argentina.

Although the Jewish presence in Kremenets was physically destroyed, the memory of Jewish Kremenetsers lived on. In the postwar years, those who successfully emigrated before the onset of hostilities, survivors of the Holocaust, and their descendants published two Yizkor Books and a series of memorial Bulletins.

== Demographics ==
As of the 2001 Ukrainian census, Kremenets had a population of 21,880 inhabitants, which slightly decreased to 20,476 in early 2022. Today, the population is almost entirely ethnically Ukrainian, while only small Russian, Polish and Belarusian communities live in the town. In terms of spoken languages, Ukrainian is the lingua franca in the town, and is considered to be the native language of almost 98% of the local population. The exact ethnic and linguistic makeup in 2001 was as follows:

Ethnic groups in Kremenets
	percent
Ukrainians	96.45%
Russians	2.50%
Poles	0.52%
Belarusians	0.21%
others	0.32%

Native languages in Kremenets
	percent
Ukrainian	97.6%
Russian	2.1%
Polish	0.1%
Belarusian	0.1%
others	0.1%

== Economy ==
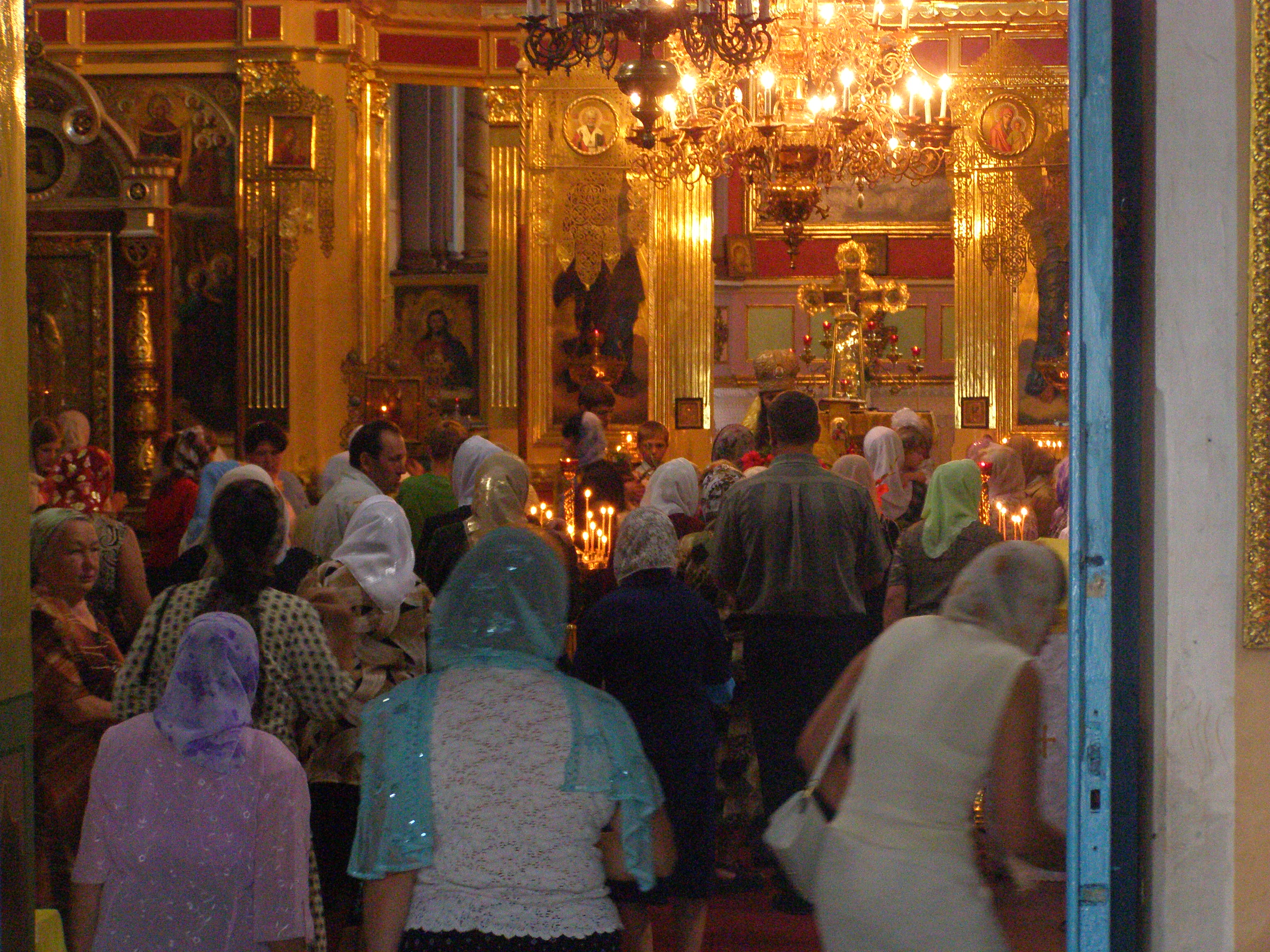
Ukrainian Orthodox Church (Moscow Patriarchate) in Kremenets

Today the economy of Kremenets is supported by Orthodox pilgrims who come to visit the cathedrals, the nunnery, and the nearby Pochaiv Lavra as well as by Polish tourists visiting the Juliusz Słowacki museum. The museum was opened in 2002, with financial help of the government of Poland, which provided one million dollars for the project. There is also a large sugar refinery, but the plant was closed during the 2008 financial crisis.

== Points of interest ==
- complex of a former Jesuit college, which housed the Krzemieniec Lyceum. Designed by Jesuit architect Paweł Gizycki, and founded by the Wisniowiecki family, it was built in 1731–1753, and among others, consists of the Saint Ignatius of Loyola church,
- Stanislaus of Szczepanow Roman Catholic church, built in 1853–1857, with a monument of Juliusz Slowacki inside. In Soviet Union, it served as a gym, currently it belongs to Ukrainian Orthodox Church,
- female Orthodox monastery, which continues the traditions of a 1636 monastery. In the Second Polish Republic, it was the seat of Orthodox Volhynian Bishops.
- Kremenets Botanical Garden, founded in 1806, making it one of the oldest botanical gardens in the country. A resolution of the Cabinet of Ministers of Ukraine from October 12, 1992 declared the Kremenets Botanical Garden as a protected area of national importance, which aims are to preserve, study, acclimate rare and common flora.

== Notable people ==
=== Ukrainian ===
- Rostyslav Hluvko – artist, graphic artist, and public figure
- Andriy Mandziy – luger, olympic athlete
- Dmitry Manuilsky – Secretary-General of Comintern
- Oleksander Osetsky – general in the army of the Ukrainian People's Republic (UNR)
- Leonid Papara – painter
- Andriy Pushkar – armwrestler, world champion
- Vitaliy Shumbarets – world cup ski jumper
- Yulianna Tunytska – luger and participant of the 2026 Winter Olympics

=== Poles ===
- Jozef Antoni Beaupre – physician and patriotic activist, graduate of the Krzemieniec high school
- Tadeusz Czacki – social activist, historian, born in nearby Poryck, founder of the Krzemieniec Lyceum
- Aleksander Czekanowski – geologist and explorer of Siberia
- Ludwik Gronowski – photographer and teacher
- Joanna Duda-Gwiazda – oppositional activist in Communist Poland, wife of Andrzej Gwiazda
- Paweł Giżycki – Baroque era architect, painter, Jesuit priest
- Henryk Hermanowicz – master of photography
- Jerzy Litwiniuk – poet and translator
- Zygmunt Rumel – poet and resistance fighter, murdered by Ukrainian nationalists on July 10, 1943
- Irena Sandecka – poet, social activist and teacher
- Juliusz Słowacki – romantic poet
- Salomea Słowacka – mother of Juliusz Slowacki, buried at the local cemetery
- Stanisław Sheybal – photographer
- Kazimierz Urbanik – mathematician, rector of Wroclaw University

=== Jews ===
- Aaron Samuel ben Moses Shalom of Kremnitz, rabbi
- Mark Kac – mathematical physicist
- Morris S. Kharasch - organic chemist
- Isaac Baer Levinsohn – writer and Haskalah leader.
- Jacob Schaefer - composer and choral director
- Isaac Stern – violin virtuoso

=== Other ===
- José Antonio Saravia - general
- Joseph Saunders (engraver) (1773-1854), English printmaker, lived and died here

== See also ==
- Franciscan Monastery, Kremenets
