= Stanisław Sheybal =

Polish photographer (1891–1976)

- Born: 9 February 1891; Sambir, Russian Empire
- Died: 15 March 1976 (aged 85); Warsaw, Poland
- Education: Jan Matejko Academy of Fine Arts, Jagiellonian University, Academy of Fine Arts in Prague

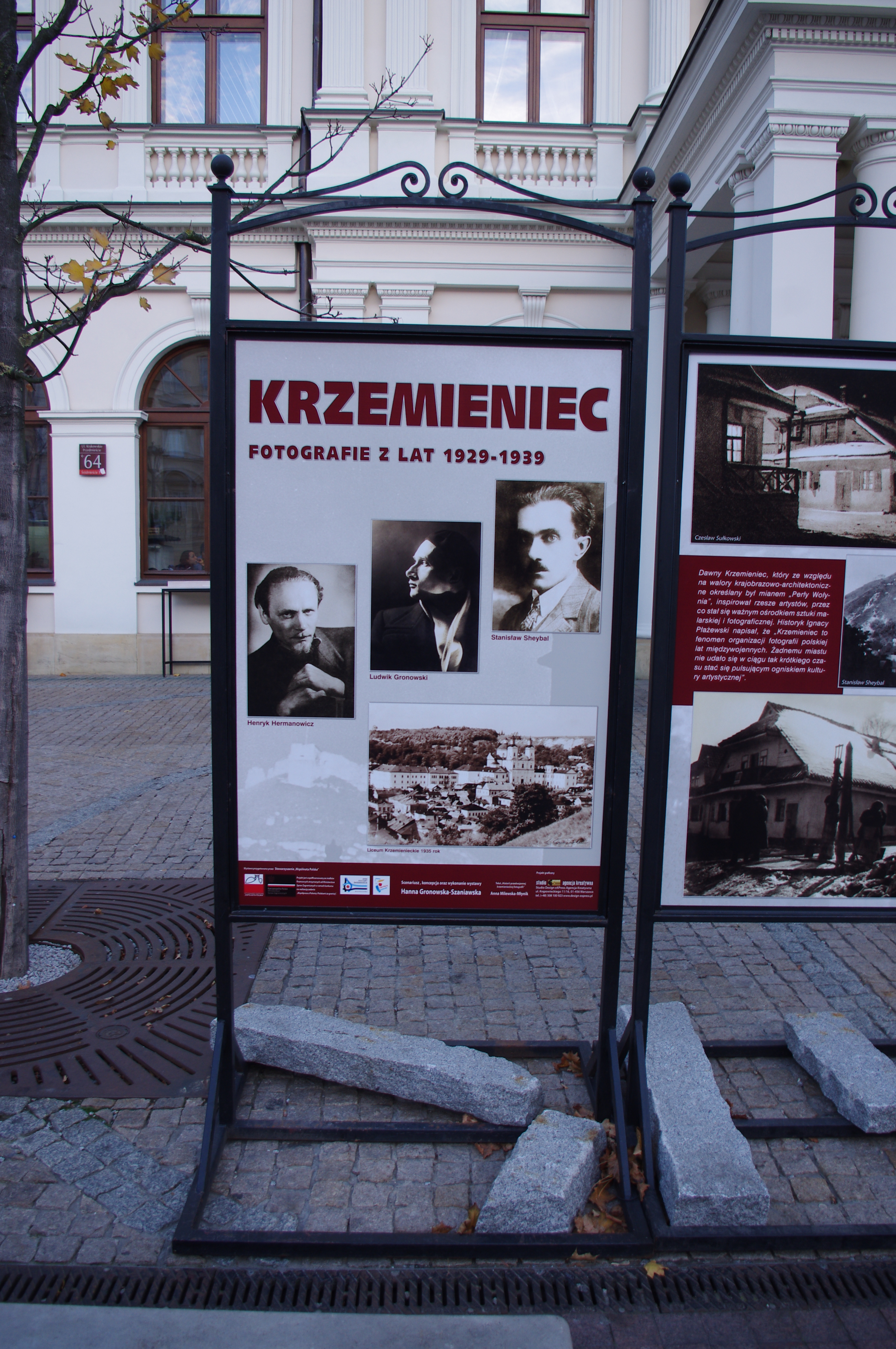
Open air exhibition – Kremenets. Photographs of 1929–1939 – at the Krakow Suburb in Warsaw (26 October 2012) on a banner with photographs of the photographers: Henryk Hermanowicz, Ludwik Gronowski, and Stanisław Sheybal.

Stanisław Sheybal (9 February 1891 – 15 March 1976) was a Polish photographer. He was a member of the Polish Photoclub, an animator and center of artistic and photographic activities in Kremenets and member of the Union of Polish Art Photographers.

== Biography ==
He was born on 9 February 1891 in Sambir, to Franciszek Ksawery (ca. 1859–1928, a Galician administration employee, and Wilhelmina (née Skibińska), a pianist. In 1911 he passed his matriculation exam at the Real school in Tarnów and began studies at the Jan Matejko Academy of Fine Arts in Kraków. He simultaneously studied mathematics and pedagogical subjects at the Jagiellonian University. In 1914–1915 he studied at the Academy of Fine Arts in Prague and worked at Neuman's photographic establishment (he also independently ran a branch of this establishment). During his studies he was drafted into the Austro-Hungarian Army. In 1916 he served in Serbia, and a year later was posted to the Officers' School. After completing a course in military cartography and aerial photography at the Military Geographical Institute in Vienna, he was assigned successively to: cartography unit in Lviv, the frontal cartography unit at the army headquarters in Kosovo, to Bukovyna and to Italy. He took part in the Polish–Ukrainian War and then in the Polish–Soviet War.

After marrying on 4 February 1919 in Sanok to Bronisława (née Kotula) (1891–1979), a bank clerk and later a teacher, they moved first to Kraków and then settled in Zgierz, where he worked at the local gymnasium as a drawing teacher. In 1927 they moved to Kremenets, where, as in Zgierz, he became a drawing teacher.

In 1928 he established a school photographic studio at the Kremenets Lyceum, and in 1930 he established the Kremenets Photographic Society. Members of the society included A. Berger, Z. Celarski, L. Gronowski i E. Smerecki. In 1931 he was admitted to the Polish Photoclub. In 1932 he was a co-founder and editor of the monthly magazine "Życie Krzemienieckie" published by the Kremenets Lyceum, the Krzemieniec Powiat Department and the Union of Social Organizations of the Krzemieniec Powiat. In 1936, the Royal Photographic Society in London, counted Sheybal among the top ten photographers using the technique of guma. In 1936–1939, he headed the examination commission for the photographic profession at the Volyn Artisan House.

A 1938 photograph by Stanisław Sheybal, "The Legend of Queen Bona's Mountain," is one of the author's best-known works and has been published many times, including in the US and Japan.

After the occupation of Kremenets by the Red Army in 1939, he worked (for two years) as a teacher at the Full Polish Ten-Year School, and during the German occupation, together with Henryk Hermanowicz, he ran the "Mystetstvo" Photographic Establishment. In 1942, he moved illegally to Warsaw, where he worked at the "BiS" photographic establishment, Bieńkowski and Szporek. At the same time, he passed the exam to become a master photographer, at the Artisans' House in Warsaw. From 1945 he cooperated in the organization of the Department of Culture of the Wojewódzki Office in Kraków. From 1946, he worked at the Ministry of Culture and Art, where he served first as an inspector and later as head of the Department of Art Education. In 1947 he became a member of the then newly established Union of Polish Artists Photographers. In 1949, he worked as a professor at the State Higher School of Fine Arts in Warsaw and later in Łódź. He used various photographic techniques.

From his marriage to Bronisława, née Kotula, he had two sons, Kazimierz, a film director and screenwriter and documentary filmmaker, and Władysław, an actor and director.

He died on 15 March 1976 in Warsaw, and was buried on 20 March 1976 at the parish cemetery in Marysin Wawerski (sector 9A-1-40).

In 1984, the publishing house Literackie Kraków prepared for publication his memoirs Wspomnienia 1891–1970, which were completed in 1986.

== Exhibitions ==
- 1929: First All-Poland Exhibition of Artistic Photography, Kremenets
- 1930: Individual exhibition of Stanisław Sheybal – 19th individual exhibition of artistic photography, Warsaw.
- 1936: "Gumy" by Stanisław Sheybal, Kremenets

== Awards ==
- Gold Cross of Merit (three times: 10 November 1933, 22 July 1952 and 19 July 1955)
- Silver Wawrzyn Akademicki (4 November 1937)
- Medal of the 10th Anniversary of People's Poland (19 January 1955)
- Medal of the National Education Commission (1967)

== Bibliography ==
- Stanisław Sheybal, "Wspomnienia 1891–1970". Wydawnictwo Literackie, Kraków–Wrocław 1984. ISBN 83-08-01209-4
- "Krzemieniec jakiego już nie ma: w starej fotografii / Henryka Hermanowicza i Stanisława Sheybala". Warszawa: ArtGraph 1993. ISBN 83901153-1-X

== Sources ==
- Панфілова, О. Станіслав Схейбаль — ключова фігура кременецького фотографічного руху // Науковий вісник Південноукраїнського національного педагогічного університету імені К. Д. Ушинського, Одеса : ПНПУ ім. К. Д. Ушинського, 2013, No. 7-8, s. 109–116.
- "Stanisław Sheybal (1891–1976), Krzemieniecki nauczyciel, działacz kulturalny, malarz i fotograf". ceeol.com. Archived from the original on 2018-06-22.
- "Biografia w iPSB". sheybal.pl. Archived from the original on 2016-04-09.
- "Krzemieniec i Liceum Krzemienieckie w latach 1920–1939" (PDF). bazhum.muzhp.pl. Archived from the original (PDF) on 2018-06-22.
- Віктор Літевчук (2018-03-02). "Кременець — центр фотомистецтва на Волині". Волинський монітор.
