= Aaron Samuel =

Aaron Samuel may refer to:

- Aaron Samuel Olanare, Nigerian footballer
- Aaron Samuel Kaidanover, Polish-Lithuanian rabbi
- Aaron Samuel ben Moses Shalom of Kremnitz, author
