= Saint Ignatius of Loyola Church in Kremenets =

Saint Ignatius of Loyola Church
- Базиліка святих Ігнатія Лойоли і Станіслава Костки
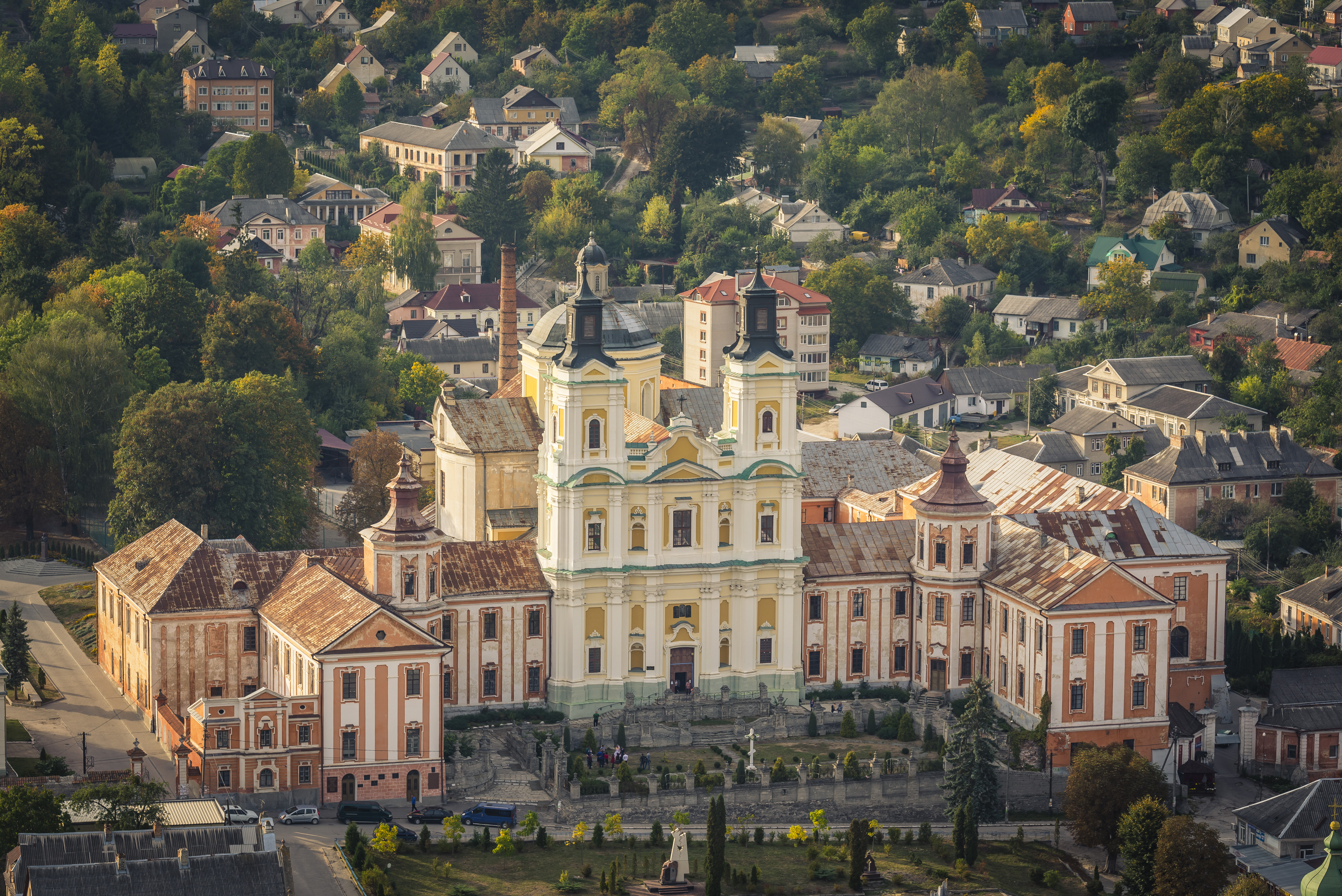
- Saint Ignatius of Loyola and Stanislaus Kostka church in Kremenets, 2016
- Saint Ignatius of Loyola Church
- 50°05′47″N 25°43′27″E
- Location: Kremenets
- Country: Ukraine
- Denomination: Eastern Orthodoxy
- Previous denomination: Catholic Church

History
- Founded: 1731
- Founder: Michał Serwacy Wiśniowiecki
- Dedication: Ignatius of Loyola

Architecture
- Functional status: active

Immovable Monument of National Significance of Ukraine
- Official name: Костел св. Ігнатія Лойоли (St. Ignatius of Loyola Church)
- Type: Architecture
- Reference no.: 190024/1

Saint Ignatius of Loyola and Stanislaus Kostka church is a church in Kremenets, Ternopil Oblast, Ukraine.

Formerly a Jesuit Roman Catholic church, designed by Paweł Giżycki and build around 1731–1745, it was converted into a parish church following the disbandment of Jesuits in the late 18th century, then into an Orthodox church in mid-19th century, briefly restored to Catholics during the Second Polish Republic time, converted into a sports center during the Soviet Union time and following the fall of the Soviet Union, turned over to the Ukrainian Orthodox Church (Kyiv Patriarchate) as Church of the Transfiguration.

== See also ==
- List of Jesuit sites
