= Jerzy Litwiniuk =

Polish translator and poet (1923–2012)

- Born: March 30, 1923; Krzemieniec, Poland (now Kremenets, Ukraine)
- Died: October 18, 2012 (aged 89); Poland
- Occupations: Translator, poet

Jerzy Litwiniuk (March 30, 1923 – October 18, 2012) was a Polish translator from Finnish (the Kalevala), Russian (Farewell to Matyora by Valentin Rasputin), Ukrainian, Belarusian, Latvian, and Estonian. He was also a poet. He lived in Warsaw.

In January 1976, he signed the Memoriał 101 letter of protest by Polish intellectuals addressed to the Sejm of the Polish People's Republic, opposing proposed amendments to the constitution.

== Awards and recognitions ==
Litwiniuk was awarded the Ukrainian Order of Merit, 3rd Class, in 2008, and the Latvian Cross of Recognition, 3rd Class, in 2005. In 1998, he received the Officer's Cross of the Order of Polonia Restituta.
