= Paweł Giżycki =

Polish architect

Paweł Giżycki (1692–1762) was a Polish Jesuit architect who worked in the eastern regions of the Polish–Lithuanian Commonwealth (mainly in the Crown of the Kingdom of Poland).

== Biography ==
Giżycki was born in Greater Poland on 21 January 1692, though his exact place of birth remains unknown. He was admitted to the Society of Jesus in Kraków in 1710. In 1712–1713, he taught grammar in Piotrków. From 1713 to 1716, he undertook philosophical studies at Lublin College, and until 1719, he lectured in Lwów, Sambor, and Sandomierz. Between 1719 and 1723, he studied theology in Sandomierz and Kraków. During this period, Giżycki likely received his architectural education at Kacper Bażanka's workshop and may have participated in the reconstruction of Kraków College after it was damaged by fire. Having completed his theological studies, he was sent on missions to the parishes of Biała, Jordanów, and Żywiec. His first known architectural work, the main altar of Żywiec parish church, dates back to 1724. Giżycki died on 28 January 1762 in Krzemieniec, Polish–Lithuanian Commonwealth (now Kremenets, Ukraine).

== Works and projects ==
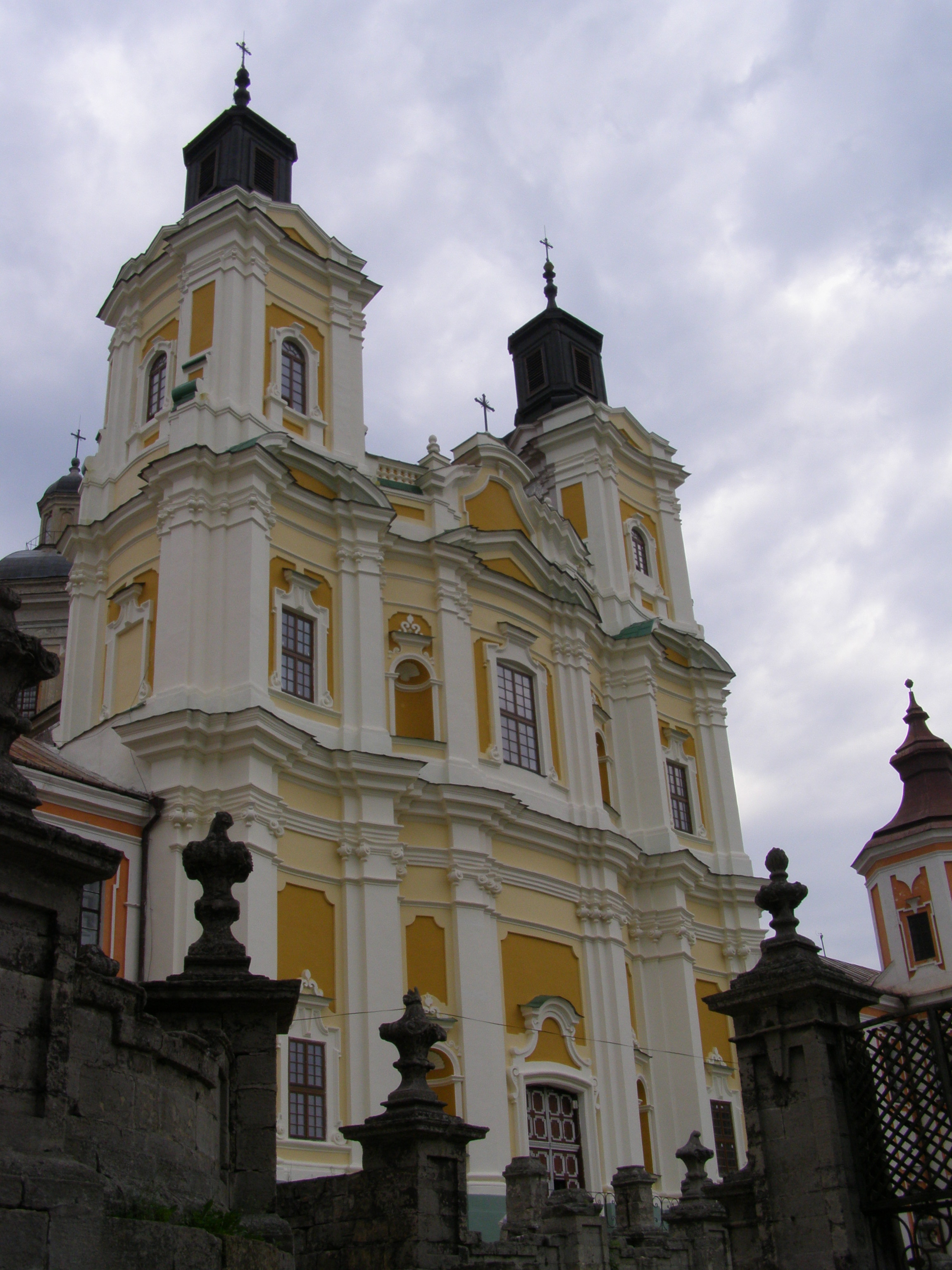
Saint Ignatius of Loyola church in Kremenets designed by Paweł Giżycki

- Castrum doloris of Paweł Karol Sanguszko in Kapucyn Church in Lublin and his tombstone in Lubartów
- Saint Ignatius of Loyola church in Kremenets (1730–1746)
- Stanisław Węcławowicz palace in Burbiszki near Vilnius
- Church and Monastery in Jurewicze
- Jesuit Church in Sambor/Sambir (c. 1730)
- Stanisław Wincenty Jabłonowski's palace (early 1740s)
- Pauline Church in Niżniów/Nyzhniv (early 1740s)
- altar of St. Stanislaus Kostka (project) in St. John Church in Jarosław)
- Reformed Church in Dederkały Wielkie
- tower of Dominican Church in Podkamień/Pidkamin
- Jesuit church in Stanisławów (now Greek Catholic Church of Holy Resurrection in Ivano-Frankivsk) (attributed)
- Bernardine Church and Monastery in Łuck (now Holy Trinity Orthodox Cathedral in Lutsk)
- Jesuit Church in Poryck, 1743–1755 (no longer existing)

== Bibliography ==
- (in Polish) Betlej, Andrzej (2003). Paweł Giżycki SJ: architekt polski XVIII wieku. Towarzystwo Naukowe Societas Vistulana. ISBN 838838516X.
- (in Polish) Betlej, Andrzej (1998). "Uwagi na temat działalności budowlanej Jezuitów oraz Pawła Giżyckiego SJ na południowo-wschodnim pograniczu Rzeczypospolitej". In Baranowski, Andrzej Józef (ed.). Sztuka pograniczy Rzeczypospolitej w okresie nowożytnym od XVI do XVIII wieku. Warsaw.
- Ostrowski, Jan K. (2011). "Art in Poland from the Renaissance to the Rococo". In Biedrońska-Słota, Beata (ed.). Polonia. Tesoros y colecciones artísticas. Madrid.
