= Krzemieniec Lyceum =

Polish secondary school

Coordinates: 50°05′47″N 25°43′28″E

- Polish: Liceum Krzemienieckie; Russian: Кременецкий лицей; Ukrainian: Крем'янецький ліцей
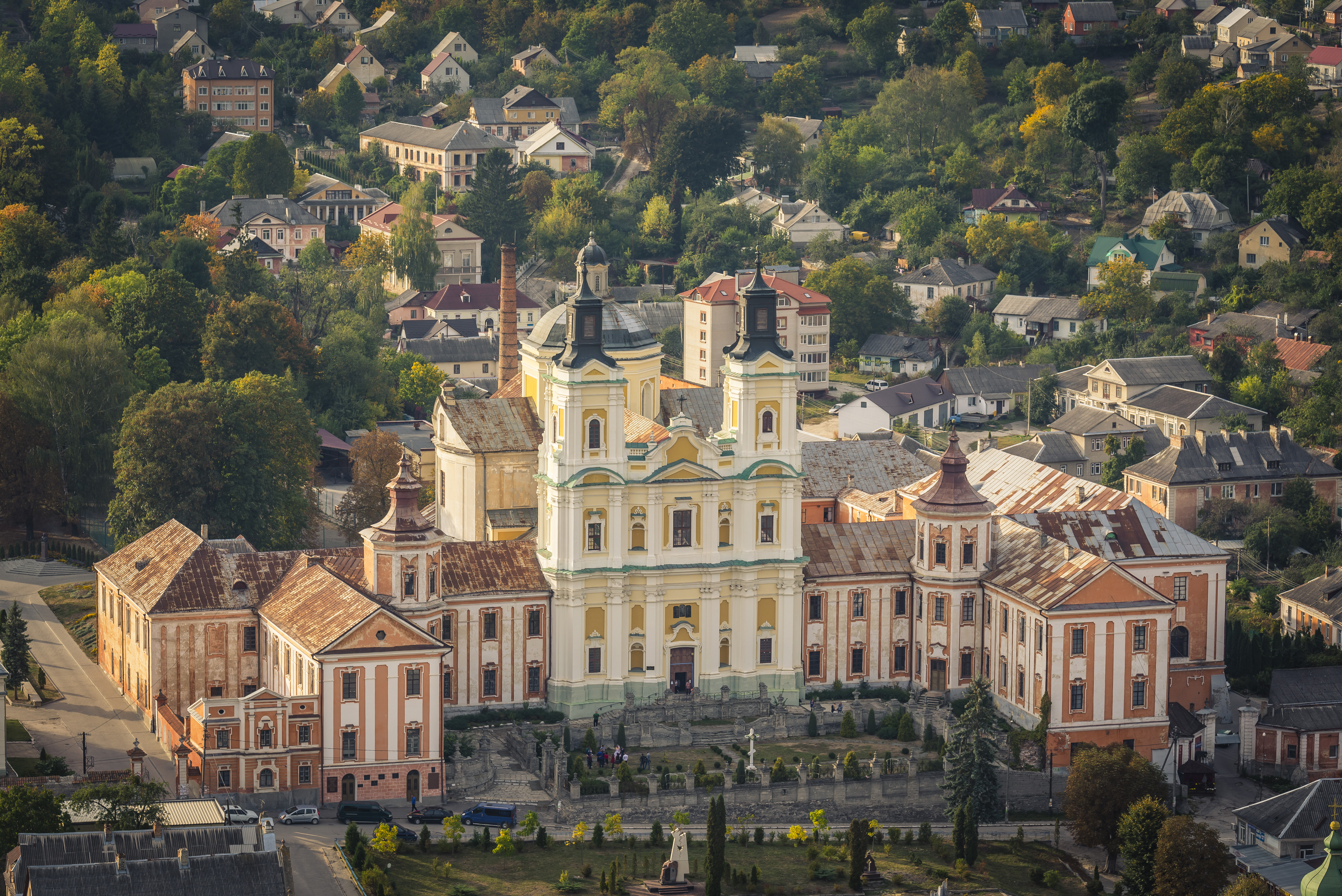

Information
- Other names: The Volhynian Athens; Czacki's School
- Established: 1805
- Closed: 1939

Immovable Monument of National Significance of Ukraine
- Official name: Ансамбль ліцею з костьолом (Ensemble of the lyceum with the church)
- Type: Architecture
- Reference no.: 190024

Krzemieniec Lyceum (Polish: Liceum Krzemienieckie; Russian: Кременецкий лицей; Ukrainian: Крем'янецький ліцей; sometimes referred to as "the Volhynian Athens" and "Czacki's School") was a renowned Polish secondary school which existed 1805-31 and later, in the Interbellum, in 1922-39 in Krzemieniec (now Kremenets in Ukraine).

== Founding ==
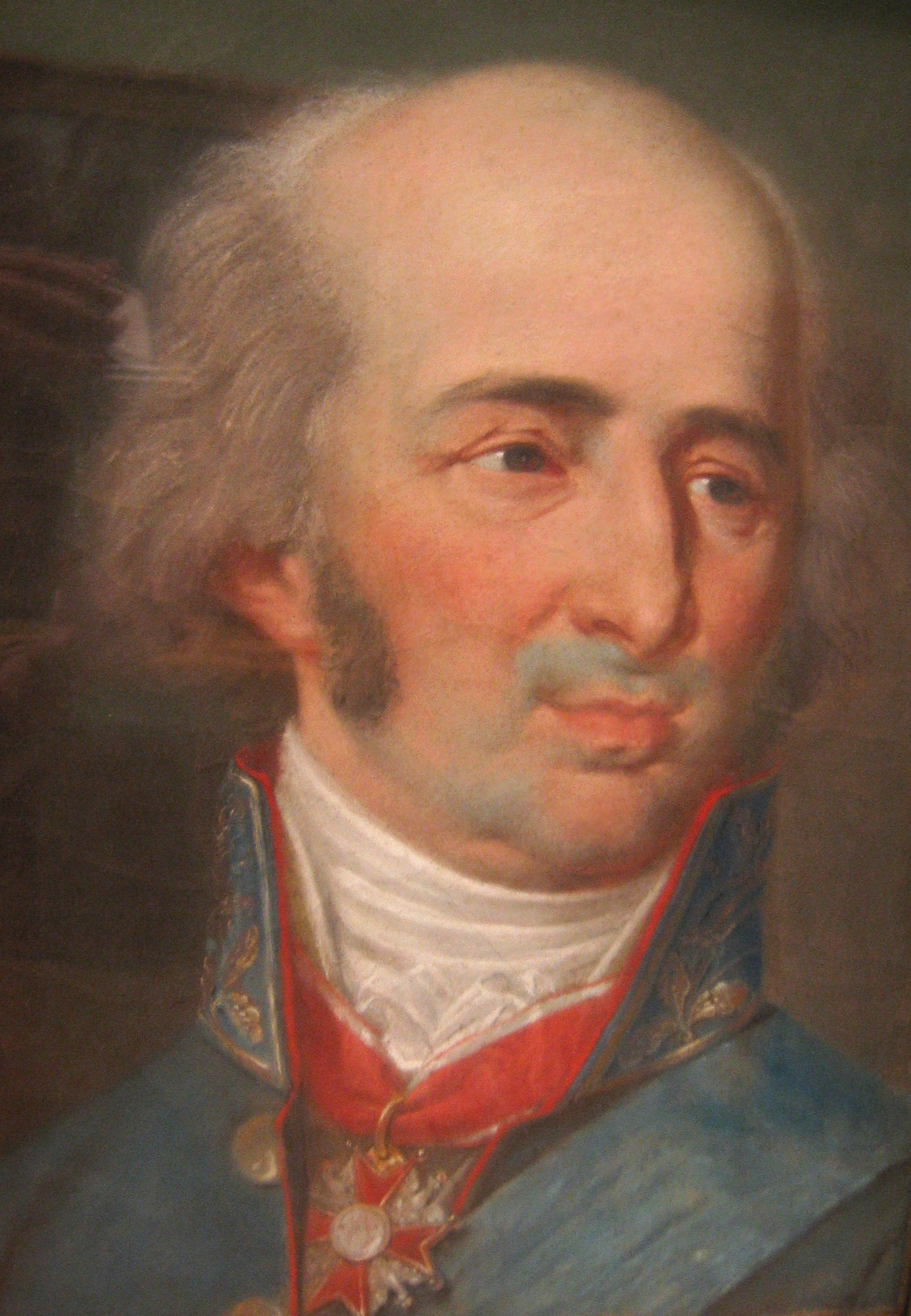
Tadeusz Czacki, founder

The school was founded, with help from Hugo Kołłątaj, by Tadeusz Czacki, who in the early 19th century was director of the school districts of three guberniyas of the Russian Empire: Volhynia Guberniya, Podolia Guberniya, and Kiev Guberniya. Czacki was directed to establish the school by the liberal Tsar Alexander I. The Russian ruler announced the school's creation on 18 May 1803. It was organized under the supervision of then-thriving Wilno University.

The school was located in buildings of a former Jesuit college and in a palace of the Wiśniowiecki family. The school served as an educational center for the southeastern part of the former Polish–Lithuanian Commonwealth (which had been partitioned out of existence in the late 18th century by Russia, Prussia and Austria). The school offered education from elementary through secondary school.

Czacki chose Kremenets because it was located near the Russian-Austrian border and so could also attract students from Austrian Galicia. Allegedly he had considered Lutsk as the site, but the presence there of a Russian army garrison was considered undesirable. Krzemieniec also offered a major advantage over neighboring cities such as Dubno and Zytomierz: the massive complex of former Jesuit college buildings.

== 1805-31 ==
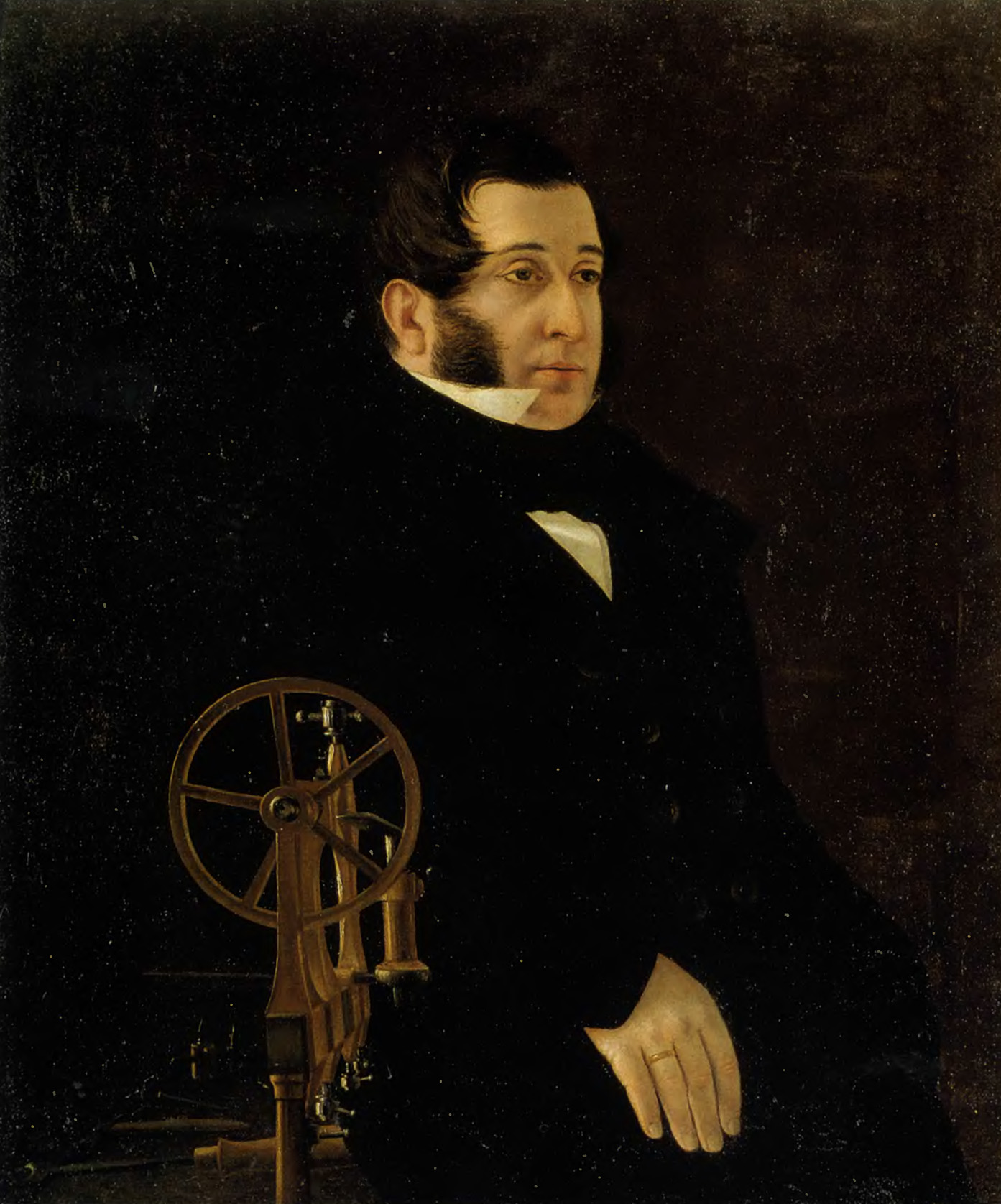
Willibald Besser

The school was originally called the "Volhynian Gymnasium"; in 1819 the name was changed to "Krzemieniec Lyceum". The faculty included such notable figures as Joachim Lelewel, Józef Korzeniowski and Euzebiusz Słowacki (father of the famous poet Juliusz Słowacki). There was only one foreign teacher, the Lemberg-educated Austrian, Willibald Besser, who taught botany and zoology. Czacki required him to perfect his Polish, as all teaching was in the Polish language. Not all students were Poles, however; the student body included many Jews and Ukrainians.

The school was proud of its library, which was based on the library of Poland's last king, Stanisław August Poniatowski, and held 34,388 books, maps and manuscripts, some very rare. The school offered a broad educational program, aimed not only at formal instruction but also at students' general intellectual development. Many students learned English, a language favored by Adam Czartoryski. The best students were given opportunities to continue their education in Edinburgh and at English universities. One of those who received a scholarship to study in Edinburgh was Michal Wiszniewski, who later became a professor of logic.

Tadeusz Czacki dreamed of the school eventually developing into a university. It grew quickly, establishing its position. Numerous donors helped with money, and the school had a modern astronomical observatory and excellent laboratories. The campus stood within a well-kept botanical garden with 8,350 kinds of plants. Seeds were given for free to landowners across Volhynia.

After its 1820s heyday, the school went into decline. In the wake of the November 1830 Uprising, as a reprisal, it was closed by the Russian authorities. Several professors and the library were transferred to the newly created Kiev University. The Russians even moved the renowned botanical gardens to Kiev by horse-cart.

== 1922-39 ==
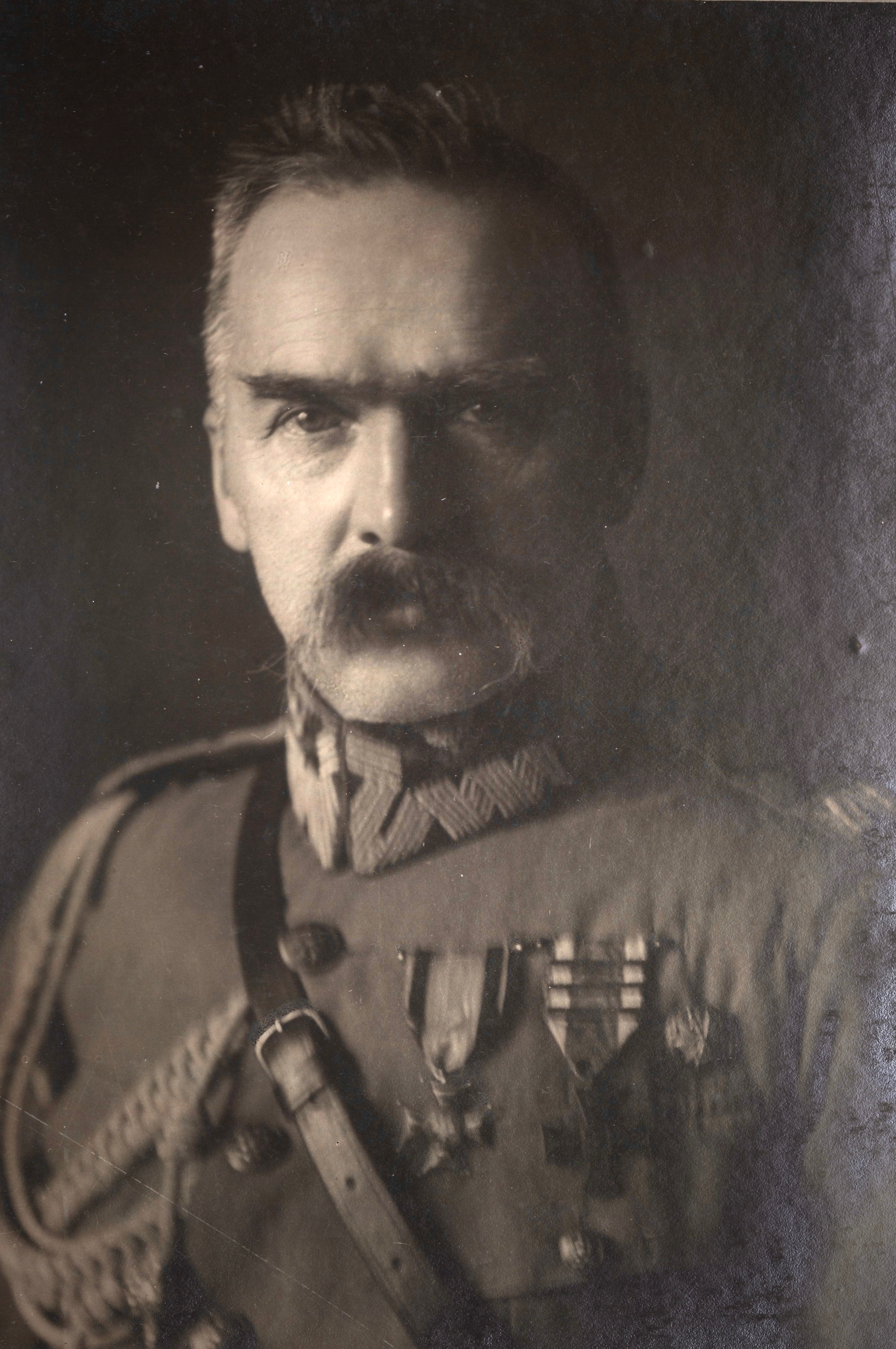
Józef Piłsudski, re-founder

After World War I, Józef Piłsudski ordered the school's re-establishment, and it reopened in 1922. It soon gained a reputation as one of the better educational institutions in eastern Poland. It enjoyed a special status as a separate entity, with its own real estate. It was not exclusively a secondary school; it included three kindergartens, an elementary school, an agricultural secondary school, a teacher's college, two community colleges, and a library.

The school was not limited to Krzemieniec, but included facilities across Dubno and Kowel counties. In 1935 the schools had some 1,000 students, and Krzemieniec was a major cultural and educational center for Volhynia Province.

The school was closed by Soviet occupation authorities in September 1939, after the German and Soviet invasions of Poland.

In 1941, 30 Polish intellectuals connected with the school, mostly teachers, were executed by the Germans, based on a list given to them by Ukrainian nationalists.

== See also ==
- Henryk Hermanowicz
- Stanisław Sheybal
- Ludwik Gronowski

== Sources ==
- Liceum Krzemienieckie
- Photo of the school
- "Stowarzyszenie Wspólnota Polska"
- KRZEMIENIECKIE LICEUM
