= Shlomo Ephraim Luntschitz =

Polish rabbi (1550–1619)

Shlomo Ephraim ben Aaron Luntschitz (1550 – 21 February 1619) was a rabbi and Torah commentator, best known for his Torah commentary Keli Yekar. He served as the Rabbi of Prague from 1604 to 1619.

== Biography ==
He was born in Łęczyca (also known as Luntschitz) and studied under Solomon Luria in Lublin, and subsequently served as rosh yeshiva (dean) of the yeshiva in Lvov (Lemberg). In 1604 he was appointed rabbi of Prague, a position he filled until his death. In the introduction of his Keli Yekar he relates that the name Shlomo was added to his name during life-threatening illness, a common practice in Judaism. One of his students was Aaron Samuel ben Moses Shalom of Kremnitz.

== Works ==
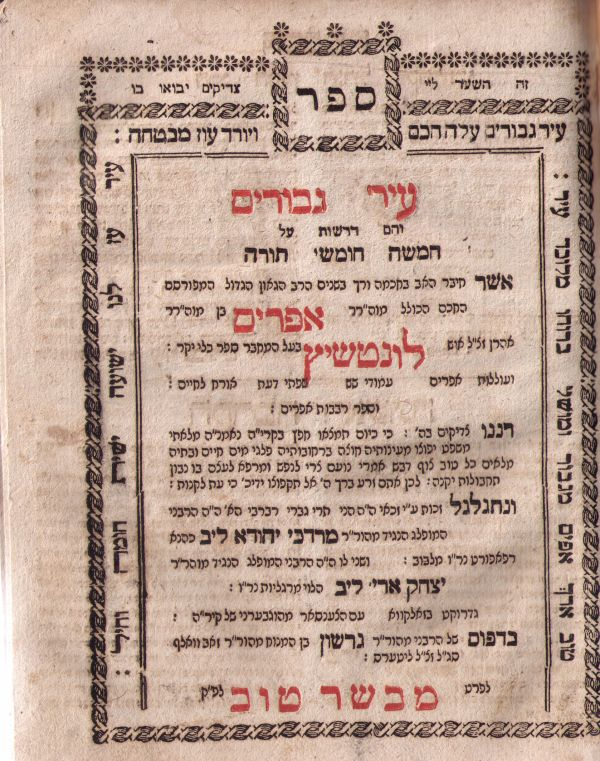
Title page of a 1799 edition of Ir Gibborim

Luntschitz is best remembered for his homiletical work, most prominently Keli Yekar ('precious vessel', an allusion to Proverbs 20:15) on the Torah which first appeared in Lublin in 1602. It is still printed in many editions of the Pentateuch and continues to be highly popular.

He composed two penitential prayers in commemoration of the 1611 pogroms that hit Prague on the 2nd of Adar on the Jewish calendar.

In addition he wrote:

- Ir Gibborim ('city of strong men', cf. Proverbs 21:22), comprising Petichot u-Shearim ('openings and gates') and two works of Torah homilies. It was first published in Basel in 1580.
- Olelot Ephraim ('grapes of Ephraim', a reference to Judges 8:2), four volumes of sermons published in Lublin 1590.
- Ammudei Shesh ('pillars of marble', Esther 1:6), sermons (Prague, 1617). Known for its criticism of pilpul.
- Siftei Da'at ('words of wisdom', also Proverbs 20:15), a continuation of Keli Yekar in style and reach, Prague 1610.
- Orach le-Chayyim ('a path for life', Proberbs 10:17), sermons for Shabbat Shuvah and Shabbat ha-Gadol, Lublin 1595.
- Rivevot Efraim ('myriads of Ephraim', Deuteronomy 33:17), not extant but mentioned in the introduction of Orach le-Chayyim.

== Literature ==
- Kli Yakar, Bereishis 1: Translated and annotated by Elihu Levine (Menucha Publishers, 2013) ISBN 978-1-56871-571-1
- Kli Yakar, Zichron Avrohom Edition: The Torah: With the Commentary of Rabbi Shlomo Ephraim Luntschitz Translated, Annotated, and Elucidated
  - Volume 1: Shemos (ArtScroll Mesorah, 2025) ISBN 9781422642757
  - Volume 2: Bereishis Veyeitzei – Vayechi (ArtScroll Mesorah, 2025) ISBN 9781422645567
- Leonard S. Levin: Seeing with Both Eyes: Ephraim Luntschitz and the Polish-Jewish Renaissance. Brill, Leiden/Boston 2008, ISBN 978-90-04164840.
