= Ludwik Gronowski =

Polish photographer and teacher (1904–1945)

- Born: 1904; Warsaw
- Died: April 1945 (aged 40–41)
- Occupation: photographer

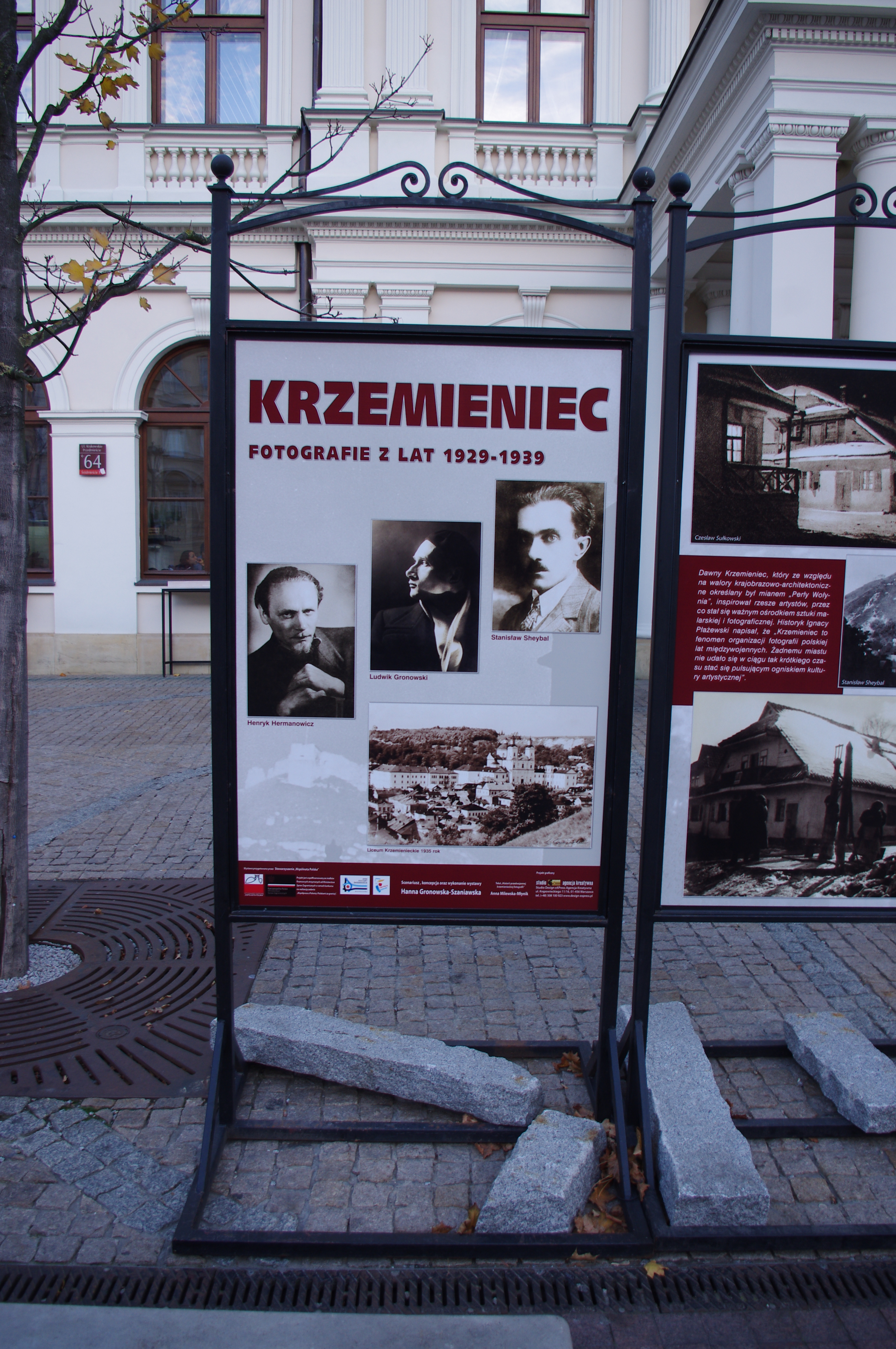
Open air exhibition – Kremenets. Photographs of 1929–1939 – at the Krakow Suburb in Warsaw (26 October 2012) on a banner with photographs of the photographers: Henryk Hermanowicz, Ludwik Gronowski, and Stanisław Sheybal.

Ludwik Gronowski (1904, Warsaw – April 1945) was a Polish photographer and teacher.

== Biography ==
In 1930 he became a lecturer at the famous Kremenets Lyceum in Kremenets, Volhynia, as a certified teacher of geometric chalking, algebra and calculus.

During the Second Polish Republic, on the initiative of Ludwik Gronowski, the Volyn Gliding School, famous throughout Poland, was established in Kremenets. Here, among others, the daughter of Marshal Józef Piłsudski – Jadwiga Pilsudska – took a gliding course.

He was a member of the Kremenets Photographic Society (1930–1939). His works were hosted in many galleries around the world: Milan, London, Paris, Antwerp, Prague, Vienna, Béthune (France), Philadelphia, Chicago, New York, and also Kremenets, Warsaw, Kraków, Lviv, Rivne, Tarnów, Grudziadz.

From Kremenets, which he chose as his family home and place of work, he left irretrievably during World War II in 1942 deep into Poland's Kielce Voivodeship. Tuitaj joined the local partisans. The harsh conditions led to illness and cachexia. He died in April 1945.

Most of Ludwik Gronowski's photographs were lost during the war. Those that survived, mainly from family collections and museums, are now displayed in various exhibitions.

== Bibliography ==
- Fotografie Krzemieniec 1930–1939, Gronowski Ludwik, 2012.

== Sources ==
- Панфілова, О. Людвік Гроновський — відомий майстер фотографії на Кременеччині // Наукові записки Тернопільського національного педагогічного університету імені Володимира Гнатюка. Сер. Мистецтвознавство / редкол.: М. Є. Станкевич, О. М. Голубець, Л. А. Кондрацька [та ін.]; головн. ред. О. С. Смоляк. Тернопіль : ТНПУ, 2013, Вип. 1, s. 157–162.
- "Krzemieniec Ludwika Gronowskiego — wystawa fotograficzna". muzeumliteratury.pl. Archived from the original on 2012-09-16.
- Віктор Літевчук (2018-03-02). "Кременець — центр фотомистецтва на Волині". Волинський монітор.
- Галина Садовська (2016-03-07). "Тут навіть стіни вчать любити рідний край". Вільне життя.
- Andrzej Garlicki (2012-10-10). "Zatrzymane w kadrze". Polityka.
