= Franciscan Monastery, Kremenets =

Franciscan Monastery
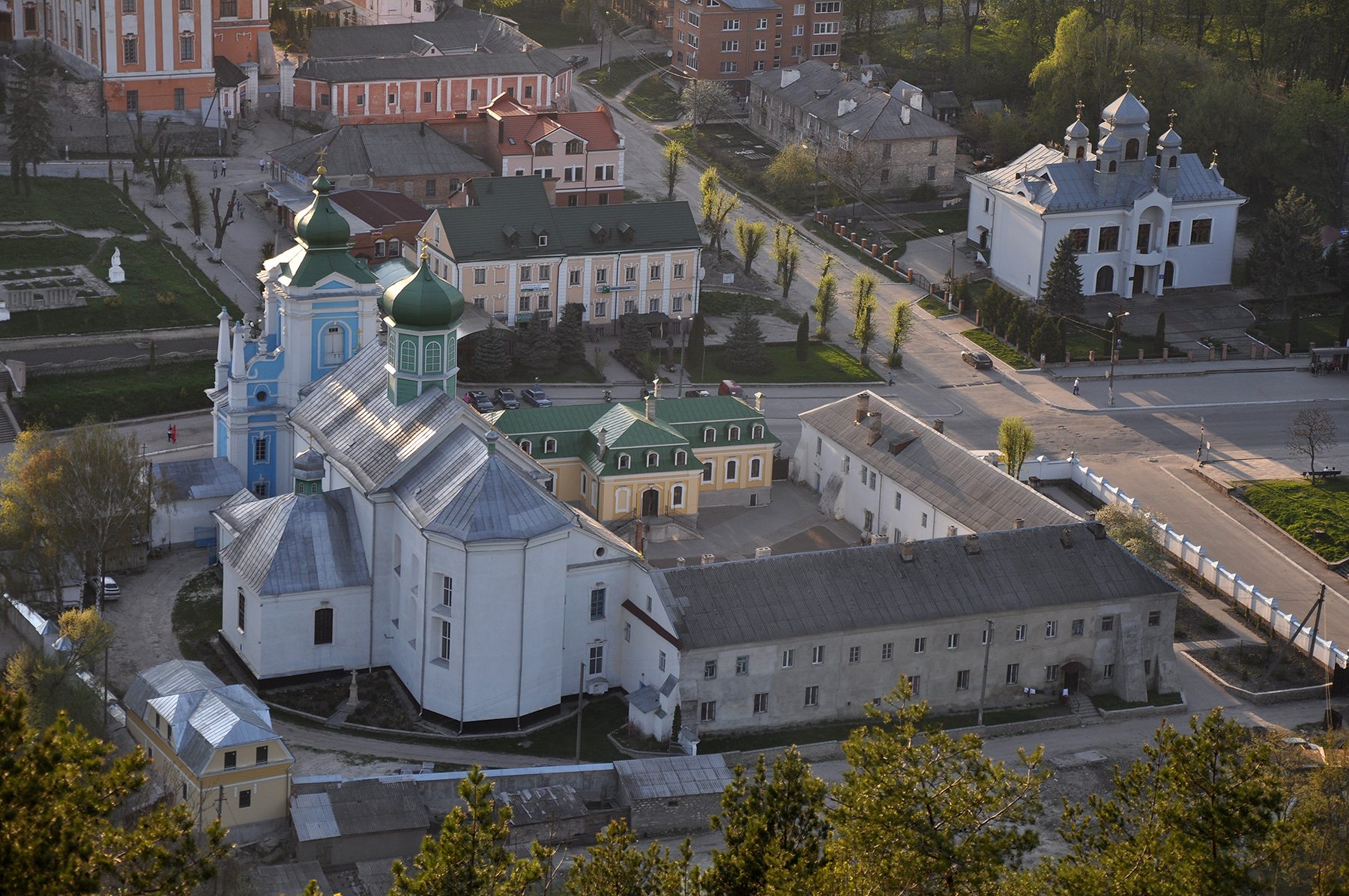
- View of the monastery from Mount Bona
- Interactive map of Franciscan Monastery

Monastery information
- Order: Franciscans (originally)
- Denomination: Orthodox Church of Ukraine
- Established: 1606

People
- Founder: Marcin Szyszkowski

Immovable Monument of National Significance of Ukraine
- Official name: Комплекс споруд Миколаївського собору з келіями (Building complex of St Nicholas Cathedral and cells)
- Type: Architecture
- Reference no.: 190025

The Franciscan Monastery (Ukrainian: Францисканський монастир) is a religious complex in Kremenets, Ternopil Oblast, and an architectural monument of national significance.

== History ==
In 1606, the monastery was founded by Marcin Szyszkowski, Bishop of Lutsk. It was built on the site of a former wooden parish church dedicated to the Assumption of the Virgin Mary, which had been founded by Queen Bona Sforza in 1538.

Thanks to the Franciscans, in the first half of the 17th century, brick buildings replaced the wooden structures: a new church and a two-story monastic building. The mid-17th century brought destruction to the monastery due to the Ukrainian Liberation War, but the monks were eventually able to resume their activities.

Magnate Stanisław Potocki (Governor of Kyiv) provided significant funds for the church (18th century). In the 18th century, a two-tiered bell tower was added to the architectural complex.

At the beginning of the 19th century, it was a large and influential institution: the monastery owned land, including the village of Bonivka (now Kremenets Raion), and its parish served Catholics not only in Kremenets, but also in about forty surrounding villages. However, in 1832, by decree of Emperor Nicholas I, the Franciscan Monastery was finally closed. Its property and buildings were transferred to the Orthodox Church, and the former Catholic church was reconsecrated as St. Nicholas Cathedral, which still functions today.

== Gallery ==
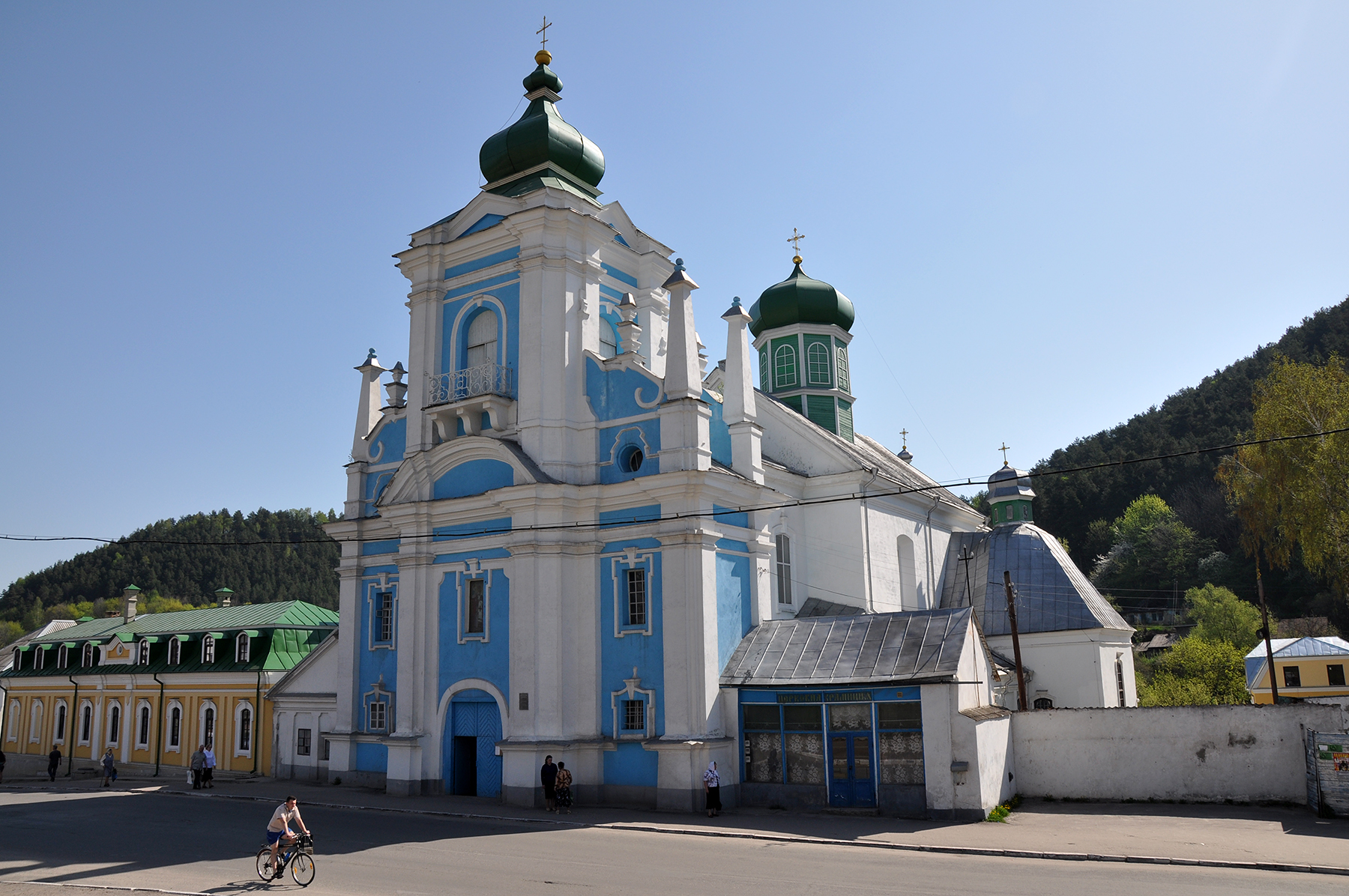
St. Nicholas Cathedral

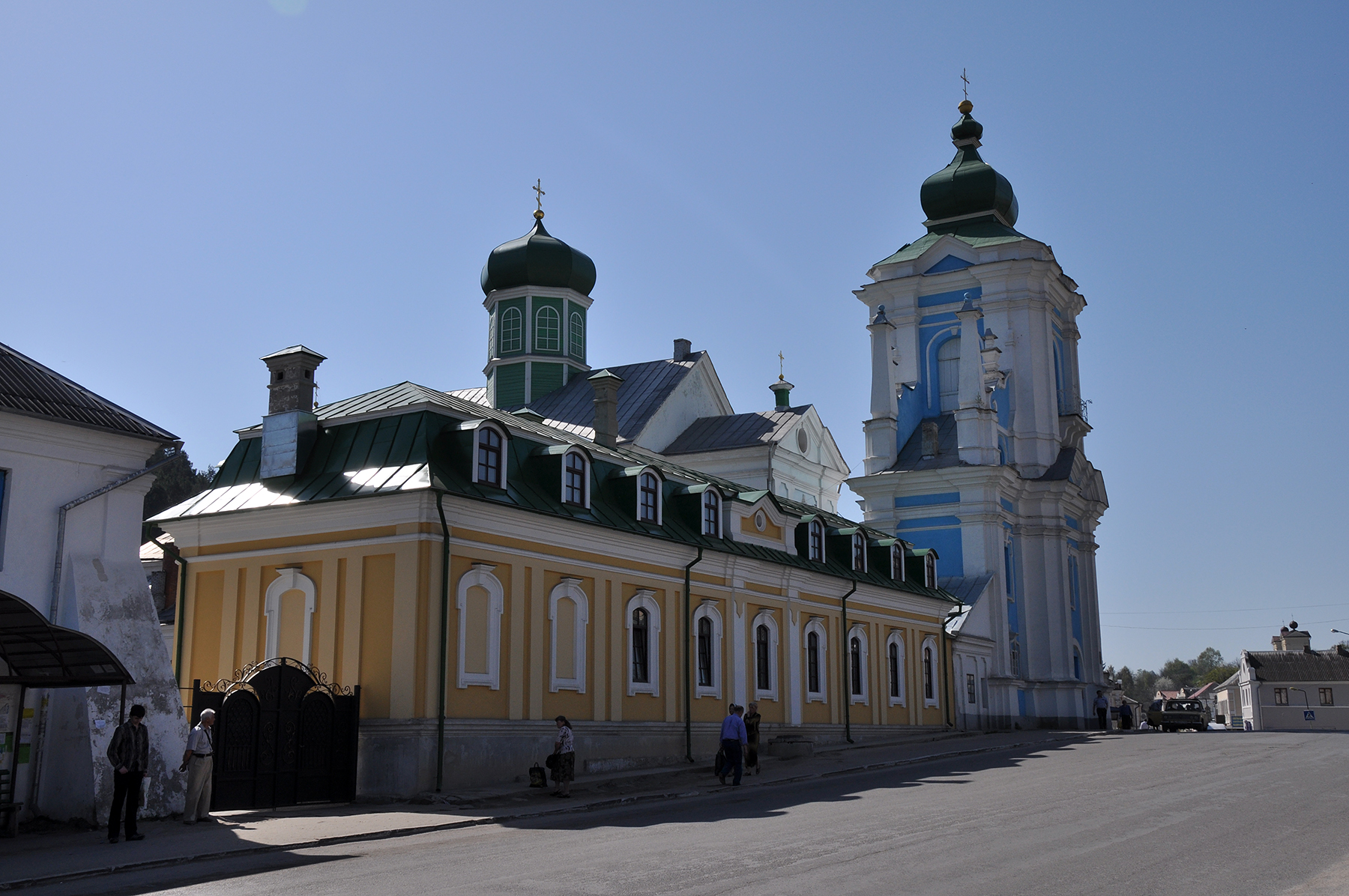
Monastery buildings
