= Leonid Papara =

Ukrainian painter (1906–1984)

- Леонід Папара
- Born: 9 August 1906; Kremenets, now Ternopil Oblast, Ukraine
- Died: 6 March 1984 (aged 77); Minneapolis, U.S.
- Education: University of Lviv
- Occupation: Painter

Leonid Papara (Ukrainian: Леонід Папара; 9 August 1906 – 6 March 1984) was a Ukrainian painter. Member of the Ukrainian Association of Visual Artists (1948) and the Ukrainian Artist's Association in USA (1971).

== Biography ==
Leonid Papara was born on 9 August 1906, in Kremenets, now Ternopil Oblast.

In 1940, he graduated with a master's degree in chemistry from the Faculty of Mathematics and Natural Sciences of University of Lviv, where he also worked concurrently in the departments of inorganic chemistry (1937–1939) and inorganic and analytical chemistry (1939–1941). In 1927, he completed his studies at the Oleksa Novakivskyi Art School.

From 1944, he was in the West, where from 1945–1949, he resided in displaced persons camps in West Germany.

In 1949, he emigrated to Minneapolis, U.S., where he died on 6 March 1984. He is buried in Sunset Cemetery in Minneapolis.

== Creativity ==
He studied art with painters in Kremenets. From the 1920s, he was in Lviv, where he mastered tempera painting and iconography under the artist Petro Kholodnyi. He also studied painting techniques and technology from the notes of his teacher, Volodymyr Peshchanskyi, who was deceased at the time.

He created works in the classical watercolor technique. Papara's works are captivating due to their generalized imagery, the lightness of their impressionistic brushstrokes, and a soft, luminous color palette.

=== Exhibitions ===
From 1920, he began presenting his works at exhibitions, notably at the History museum of Kremenets. In 1934, he participated in the 6th exhibition of the Association of Independent Ukrainian Artists in Lviv; in 1947, he exhibited with Ukrainian émigré artists at the National Museum in Munich, as well as in other cities including Neumarkt, Regensburg, Nuremberg (all in Germany), Paris; the University of Minnesota, the Minneapolis Institute of Art, and New York City. Individual works by Papara are preserved in private collections in the USA and Ukraine (among them: the watercolor series "Zolota osin" (1930), and the watercolors "Zyma u Karpatakh" and "Osinnii peizazh iz khatoiu").

Among his important works:

- Watercolors: "Tserkva v Neumarkti", "Mlyn", "Zakhid sontsia", "Pered doshchem", "Lisnychivka".

Painting of the Ukrainian Church of St. Constantine (Minneapolis, USA).

== Bibliography ==
- Papara Leonid / L. V. Voloshyn // Encyclopedia of Modern Ukraine [Online] / Eds. : I. М. Dziuba, A. I. Zhukovsky, M. H. Zhelezniak [et al.] ; National Academy of Sciences of Ukraine, Shevchenko Scientific Society. – Kyiv : The NASU institute of Encyclopedic Research, 2023.
- (in Ukrainian) Дуда І., Папара Леонід // Ternopil Encyclopedic Dictionary: in 4 v. / editorial board: H. Yavorskyi and other, Ternopil: "Zbruch", 2008, V. 3: П—Я, S. 26. — ISBN 978-966-528-279-2.
- Папара Леонід // Книга Творчости українських мистців поза Батьківщиною = Ukrainian Art in Diaspora / гол.ред., вступ. сл. П. Мегик; пер. Д. Барабах, В. Шиприкевич, М. Богачевська-Хом'як. — Філядельфія, Па : «Нотатки з Мистецтва», 1981. — 512 с.
- L. Voloshyn (2024). "Папара Леонід". Мистецька школа Олекси Новаківського 1923-1935. Життя у перспективі часу (in Ukrainian). Lviv–Drohobych: Kolo. p. 254, 409—410. ISBN 978-617-642-676-9.
- Книга мистців і діячів української культури. — Торонто, 1954.
- Каталог мистецької виставки. — Регенсбург, 1947. — С. 18.
