= Henryk Hermanowicz =

Polish photographer (1912–1992)

- Born: 20 October 1912; Vilno, now Vilnius
- Died: 3 May 1992 (aged 79); Kraków
- Occupation: photographer

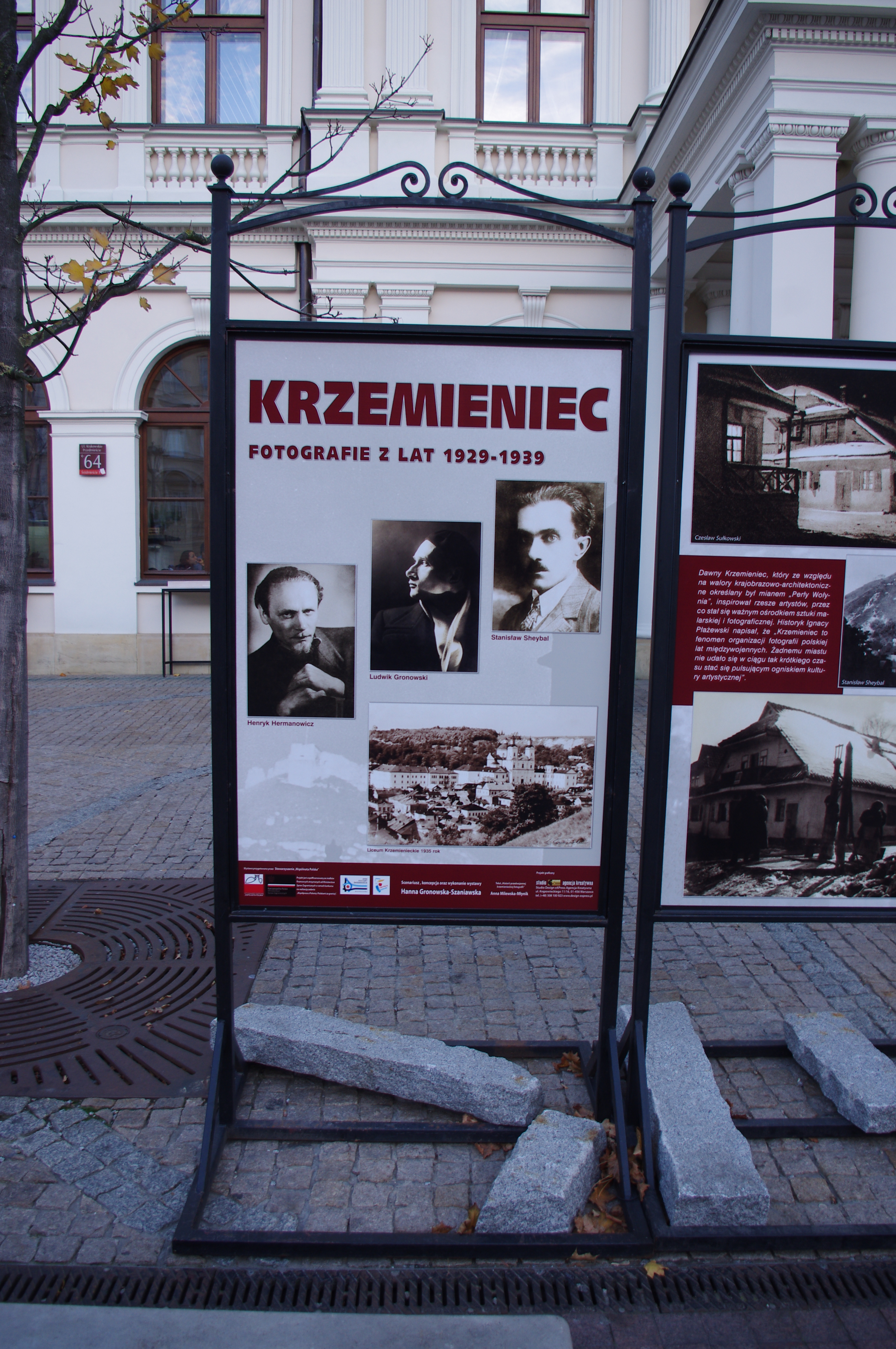
Open air exhibition – Kremenets. Photographs of 1929–1939 – at the Krakow Suburb in Warsaw (26 October 2012) on a banner with photographs of the photographers: Henryk Hermanowicz, Ludwik Gronowski, and Stanisław Sheybal.

Henryk Hermanowicz (20 October 1912 – 3 May 1992) was a Polish master of photography, a student of Jan Bułhak.

== Biography ==
He is listed in the Encyclopedia of World Photography (Switzerland). He worked as a professor at the Kremenets Lyceum (from 1937), head of the Kremenets Museum of Local Lore (from 1940).

During the Second World War, together with Stanisław Sheybal, he opened the "Mystetstvo" photo salon in Kremenets.

From 1945, he lived in Kraków.

== Creativity ==
In 1931, he made his debut as a master at the V International Salon of Art Photography. Participated in international exhibitions.

He illustrated the books-albums "Kremenets", "Chudove ridne misto Juliusza Słowackiego", "Misto velykoi tuhy" (all published in 1939, Kremenets) published on the occasion of the 130th anniversary of Juliusz Słowacki birth.

The works are kept in the collections of the Regional Literary and Memorial Museum of Juliusz Słowacki and the Kremenets Local History Museum.
