= Aaron Samuel ben Moses Shalom of Kremenets =

Jewish writer

Aaron Samuel ben Moses Shalom of Kremenets (אהרן שמואל ב"מ משה שלום) was a rabbi from Kremenets who died 1616. He was a student of rabbi Shlomo Ephraim Luntschitz and lived in the city of Eisenstadt (in the year 1611). It was documented by Rabbi Aharon Shmuel ben Moshe Shalom from Kremenitz himself that he also stayed in Fürth. He mentions that in 1606, he delivered a sermon for Shabbat Pinechas in the synagogue of Fürth (page 25b of Nishmat Adam). Or ha-Ḥayyim reports that he also taught in the German city of Fulda.

== Works ==
- Nishmat Adam Hanau, 1611, on the nature and origin of the soul, the reason for its descent and its purpose in this world, as well as the afterlife and reward and punishment. The book was reprinted in the year 1732 in Wilhermsdorf.
- Be'er Sheva, the book ist divided into gates, which he named, and each gate into chapters. He mentions it in the book "Nishmat Adam" on page 7b.

== Jewish Encyclopedia bibliography ==
- Michael, Heimann Joseph, (1891) Or ha-Ḥayyim, Frankfort-on-the-Main (in Hebrew), entry 318;
- Benjacob, Isaac, Oẓar ha-Sefarim,, Oẓar ha-Sefarim, p. 404.
