= Kremenets Castle =

Castle in Kremenets, Ternopil Oblast, Ukraine

- Zamkova Street, Kremenets, Ternopil Oblast
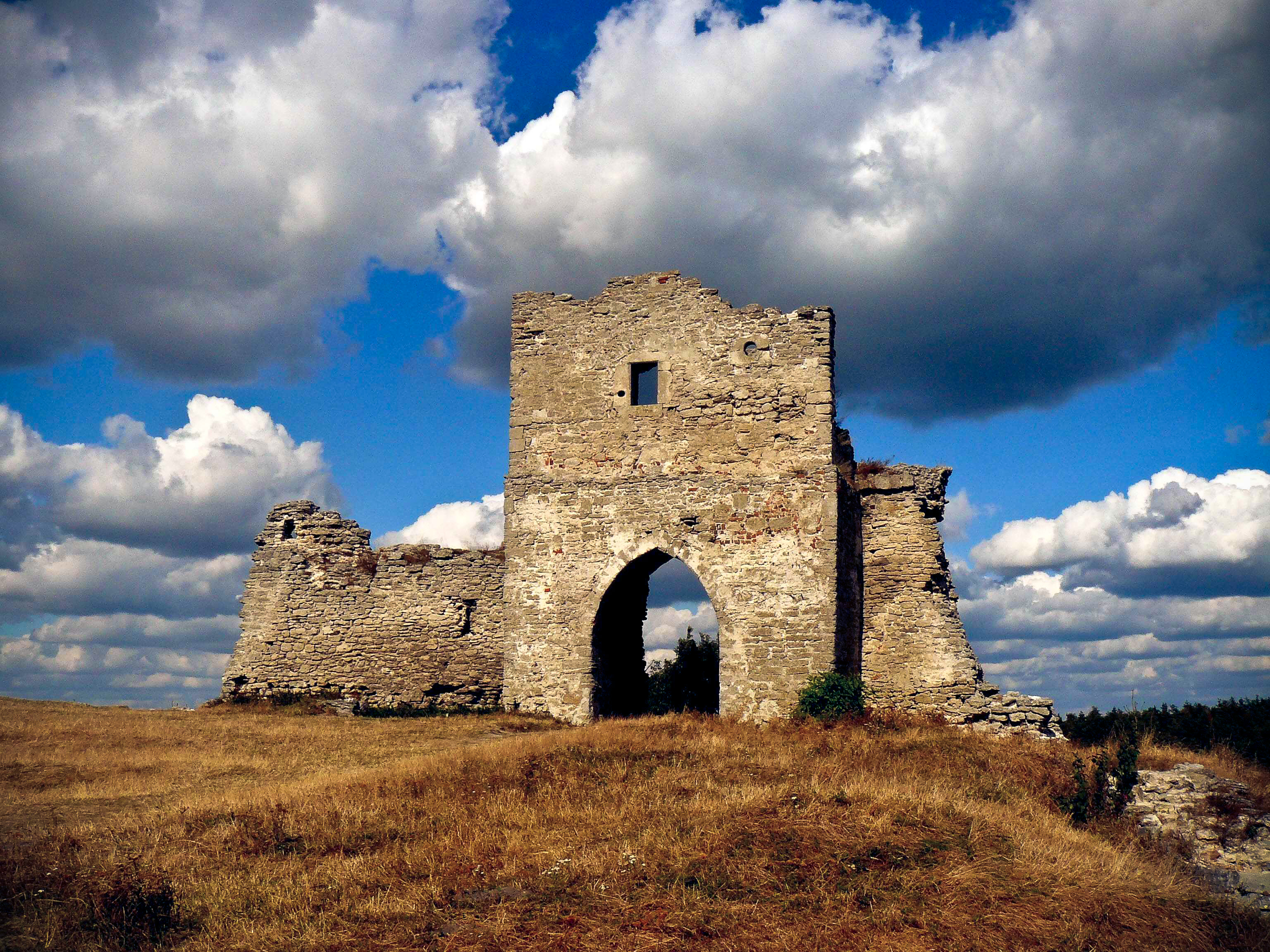

Site information
- Type: Castle
- Condition: ruins

Location
- Coordinates: 50°05′42″N 25°43′51″E

Site history
- Built: 13th century
- Materials: limestone

Immovable Monument of National Significance of Ukraine
- Official name: Замок, руїни (Castle ruins)
- Type: Architecture
- Reference no.: 190023

The Kremenets Castle (Ukrainian: Кременецький замок, romanized: Kremenets'kyi zamok, Lithuanian: Kremenecio pilis, Polish: zamek w Krzemieńcu) is a castle situated in the city of Kremenets, Ternopil Oblast, Ukraine. The castle was built of limestone on a steep hill. The keep located on its west side, and its width was 65 metres (213 ft) and length of 135 metres (443 ft). All the elevation was surrounded by a tall stone wall, and in the earlier ages of the 13th century wood as building material was used instead.

The castle is known as an impregnable citadel that had been attacked by Hungary, the Mongols, the Cossacks, and others.

== History ==
=== Transformation timeline ===
When facts, events, and people put together in millennium long history, it is quite a story. Further we depart into depth of the centuries, more complicated it gets to establish specific dates. According to some Polish sources, Kremenets as a fortified town had existed by the year of 1064, when front ranks of landlord Bolesław II the Generous (1042–1081) charged it being an obstacle during his Kievan campaign.

A few decades afterwards following unsuccessful attack on the town of Ikva enacted with the same squadrons of Bolesław II the Generous, the castle gates were opened voluntarily to the order of his owner, Denisko Mokasiev. As a reward he with his family received a lifelong town propriety patent of Kremenets.

Russian sources based on Galicia annals refer to the fortress in the course of the battle between Galiciaa landlord Mstislav the Lucky (1175–1235) against the army of Hungarian king Andrew II the Jerosolimitan (1175–1235) in the vicinity of Kremenets. The winning streak of Hungarian forces were snapped although great casualties sustained.

The city was one of a few that persisted through Golden Horde inroads on the land of Galicia and Volyn' during 1241–1255, nonetheless losing its commissioner who resorted to treason trying to remain in power. The castle only could not survive to the will of its defenders. In 1261 to the order of Khan Boroldai's tumen, the stronghold was disassembled by Volyn' landlord, Vasyl’ko Romanovich (1203–1269).

Life on the castle hill revived only 20 years later, in the 1290s, to those days' initiative of Volyn' ruler, lord Mstislav Danilovych, in the years following 1292.

Difficult fortunes plagued that fringed fastness in the 14th century, since the downfall of Galicia-Volyn' dominion brought about power struggle of neighboring sovereigns, as Poland, Hungary, Lithuanian challenged each other. Kremenets Castle dilapidated at the century winding.

Having turned out in the year of 1396 year to the hands of great Lithuanian prince Vytautas, the fortress of Kremenets acquired some certainty, as it was being repaired and battle readiness restored. Behind its walls a military squadron was dislocated. The power gained again together with distinctiveness and illustrious forbidding originated from king's choice of royal dungeon owned by the prince Švitrigaila (1370–1452).

For the centuries to come the fate of disgraced prisoner until the year of 1408 and thereafter the great prince of Lithuania as well as prince of Volhynia tied with that ground. Having become to him a bastile, later it was a stronghold of his encroach on Litvonia sovereign. It could be for that only reason town was entitled conducting self-governing status under the clause of province equal to Lutsk and Vladimir.

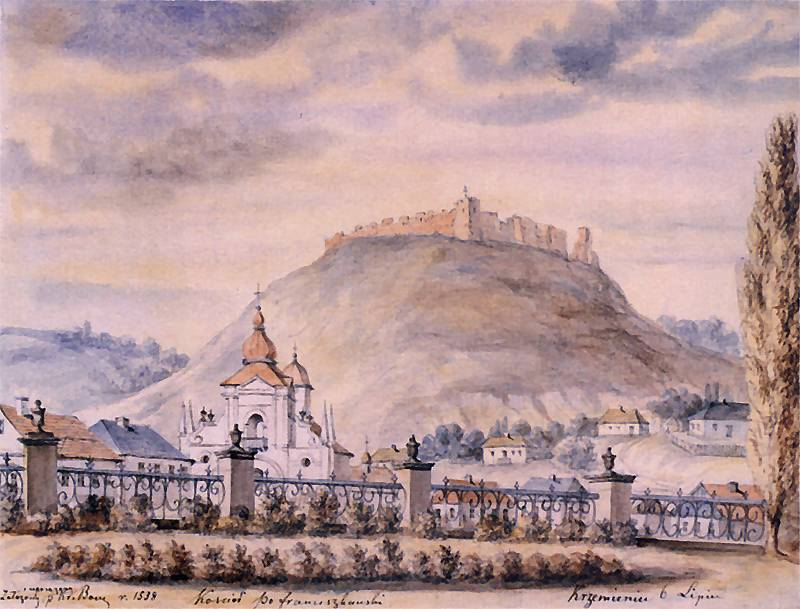
Kremenets Castle, between 1862 and 1876

Facing increasing Tatar aggression for half of the century, fort-post overlooking river Ikva therein as Polish–Lithuanian Commonwealth property became perpetual battleground ascribing it to its borderline disposition. Although for that matter there were benefits reaped out of it. Generous outfitting subventions, restoration and security upgrades gave a momentum to further city development.

Again, the castle's importance to the state was conformed by the Polish king and Litvonia prince' decree bestowing the town and vicinities to his spouse, Bona Sforza, thanks to whom Castle Hill received its another name, Bona. By the same streak fortress got new impulse for its development attributed to boundaries expansion of land and property.

Last days Kremenets Castle met in September 1648 in the course of a month-and-a-half siege of Maksym Kryvonis' squadrons. Tombstones remained as a mute reminder of a bloody attack, when the fortress first and the last time fell in order to never rise from ashes again.

Archaeological excavations organised in the 1970s were performed on the castle ground. There were ethereal ideas of restoration bringing it from the limbo, but inspiration and fund raising are lacking to do it practically.

=== Folklore narrative ===
Krements Castle came into existence long before princess Bona Sforza, wife of Polish king Sigismund the First. It is theorized, that the stronghold was erected in the 8th or 9th century. First written citations of Krements were found in Polish literature of 1064. The castle received great fame after unsuccessful horde attack of Batu Khan in the winter time of 1240–41. The fortress became known by the name of Polish princess of Italian descent, Bona Sforza. People of the countryside narrated many peculiar and imaginary stories on her behalf. Supposedly she sought eternal youth. In the course of absence any medicinal treatment that would provide it for her, Sforza would have to use blood of innocent virgins. They were thrown off store height in the castle tower on sharp stakes of lettuce work bearing, while the store down she was standing taking a gory shower. There is another legend telling a story of a rope bridge crossing built out of female braids of hair that princess used to take to get into the castle.

To many well known narration about a tradition that Bona observed hiding out in a water well of underground palace and every Easter used to come out holding in her chin a golden key to a secret treasure chest filled with gold. Even though historian assert that Sforza owning the castle for twenty years had not visited it even once, motley canvas knit out of ancient legend perplex imagination.

Legends remain to be legends, but the castle existence in many aspects has to be credited to Sigismund's I spouse. The king gave it to her all together including town outskirts in 1536. The new hostess secured tall bulwark, three towers, barracks, utility structures, and magazines. A deep well, later on becoming a source of an imaginary story, was dug out as main water supply for the troopers in case of prolonged siege. Managing the country with a help of her monitors, Bona introduced a system of oppressive imposition that consisted of monetary as well as natural goods taxation. This turned out to be viewed as a persecution towards native population. Departing to Italy due to her husband's death, she shipped out 70 horses drawn wagons of valuables.

Relieved from its ruthless owner, the castle remained to be on guard. For a long time no one could have overcome this stronghold. Only in September 1648 colonel Maksym Kryvonis managed to besiege it. For a month and a half lasted furious battle between Cossacks and Szlachta. At last the fort-post fell. Since then it has not been rebuilt. And, next to the hill platform P’yatnitsky graveyard appeared retaining tombs of warrior burials.

The Castle Hill has become a tourist destination of Kremenets State Historic Architectural Preservation. Thousands of people come to visit it in order to get a glimpse of fortress bulwark and bird's eye view of the town and its vicinity. Gothic arch of the gatehouse brings you into the castle yard. Not that long ago a TV-relay antennas were located here. But remains of the wall with its jugged outlines stand deserted now giving a clue if its dramatic past time.

== Architectural snapshots ==
Having ground broken in the 11th or 12th century originally as Slavic enceinte positioned on the western fringe, fort-post was on top of 400-metre-high (1,300 ft) Castle Hill. It comprised considerably smaller dimensions comparatively to modern encompassing ragged outline. Facing forward stone bulwark plummeted two meters down turning into convoluted mirroring shaped to the crag drop-off.

The castle as it appears nowadays was laid out in the 1290s. Its perimeter increased considerably by fourfold and outer line of battlement structure was constructed adjoining Chervlena gatehouse, initially as a single architectural piece, with wooden drawbridge over an inlet. Fortpost occupied the crest of hill, completely towering a circle of tall bulwarks as high as 8 metres and thick as 2 metres.

Later in the northern part of the castle double-decker portal tower containing spade-shaped arch slash through became principal entry way to the complex from the side of Chercha mount. Triple-decker tower over a new house was erected in the western part of the encente in order to have a bird's-eye view of the town and vicinity. The first level was allocated for strategic reserves of provision, second level was inhabited including some living areas devoted to utility rooms, third level retained cannons.

Reinforcing security of the fortress on the side of mount Cherche inlet, a moat was dug out and two stone bastions constructed.

All the inside area of fortified perimeter was taken by thirty-four wooden structures of affluent town dwellers, where their most valuable possessions were secured due to prolonged subsistence on the front line, rainwater stone collector, nine magazines packed with provisions, living headquarter constructed out of durable wood, St. Michael's chapel, and other utility structures as dungeon, bakery, sentinel shack, etc.

Kremenets Castle's complex design was conceived on the principles of early Gothic defence architecture that implied two dead-end lower decks, minimum of decorations, simplicity of geometrical spans, merlon battlement with its crenelated parapet of 2-metre-high (6.6 ft) wood scaffolding covering the whole length of fortress walls.

Only Portal tower on the north-eastern mount side with adjoining to it corner of the bulwark, tower over the new house, and fragments of western and eastern walls have been preserved.

== Gallery ==
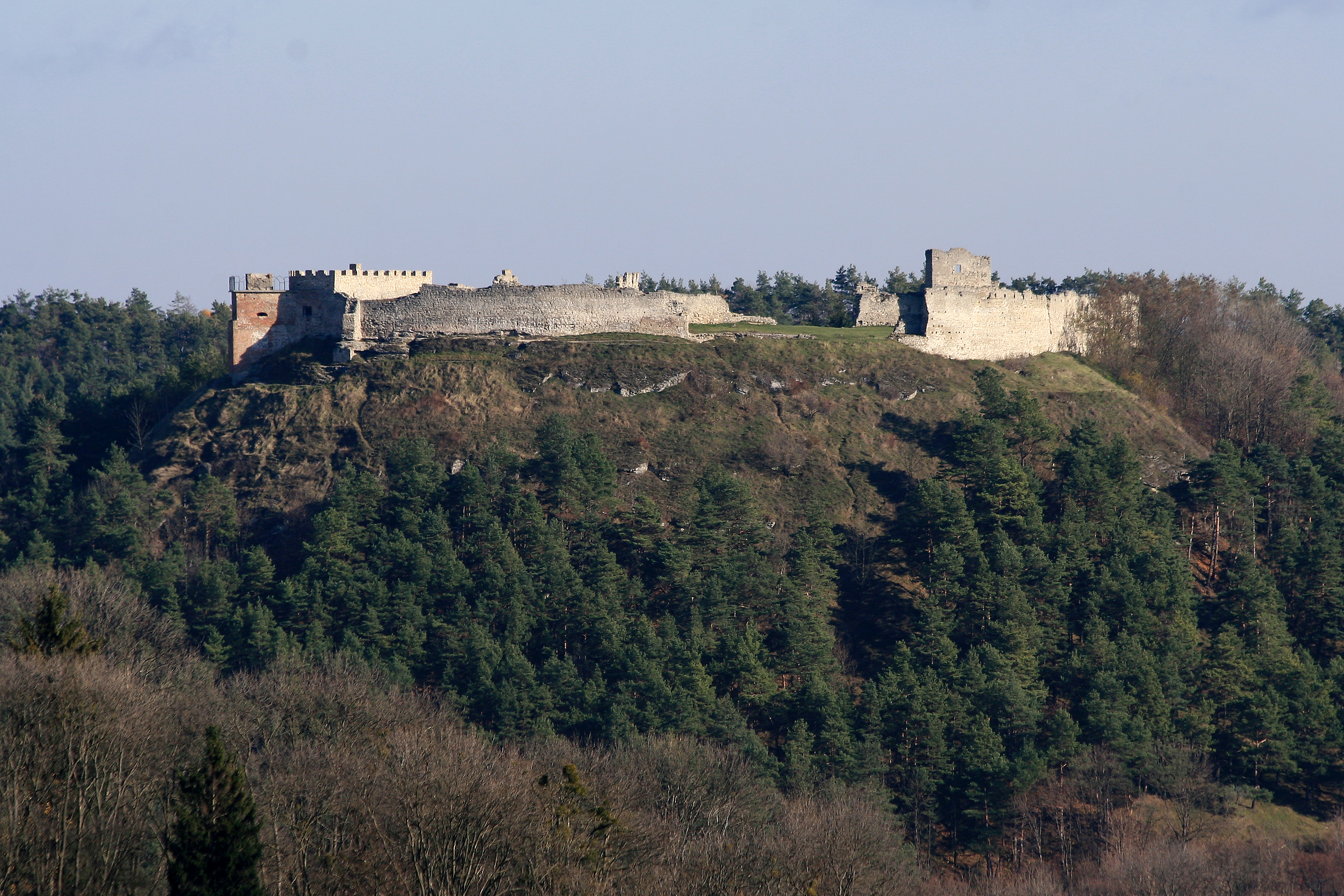
Landscape

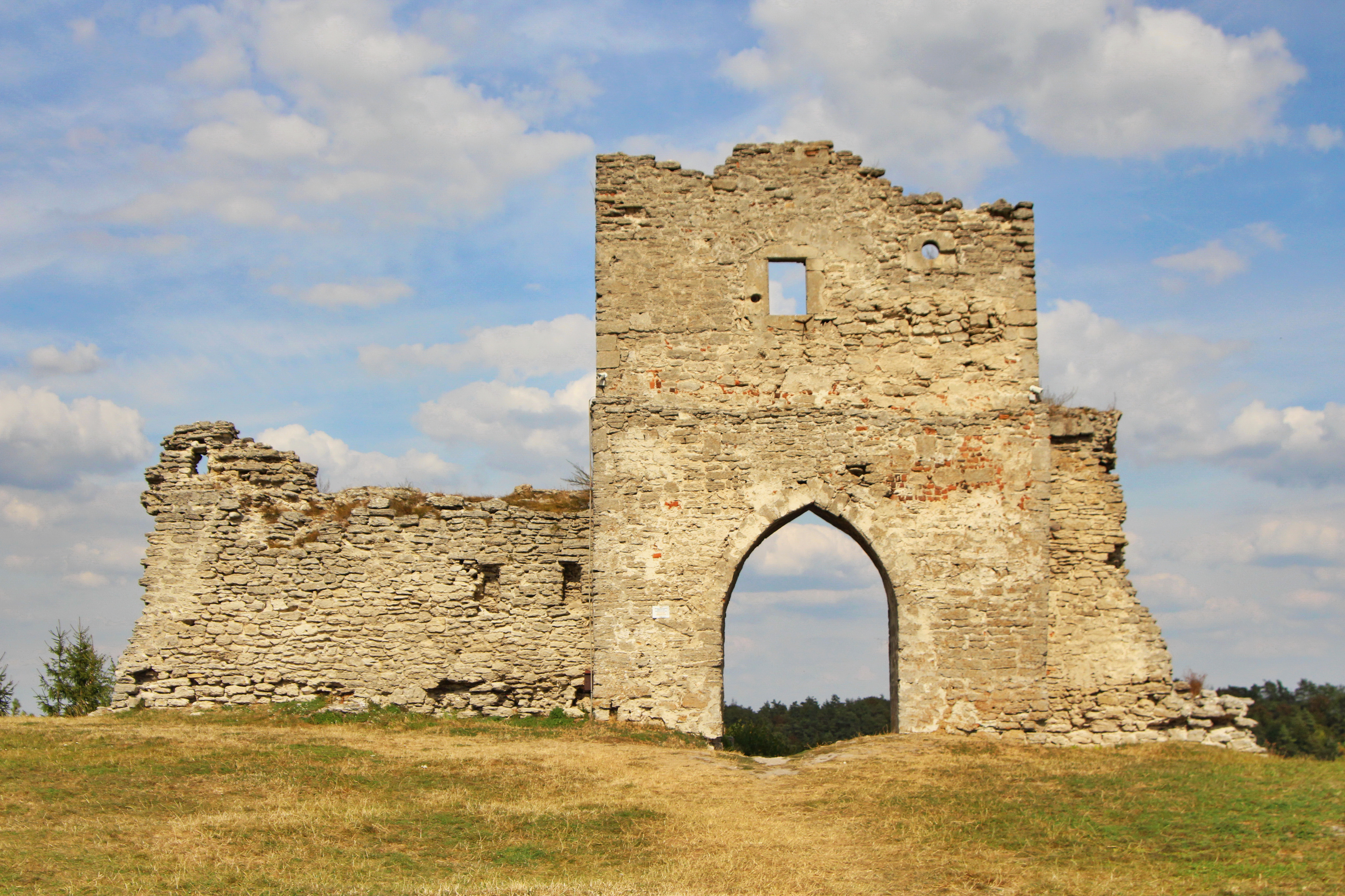
Ruins of the entrance

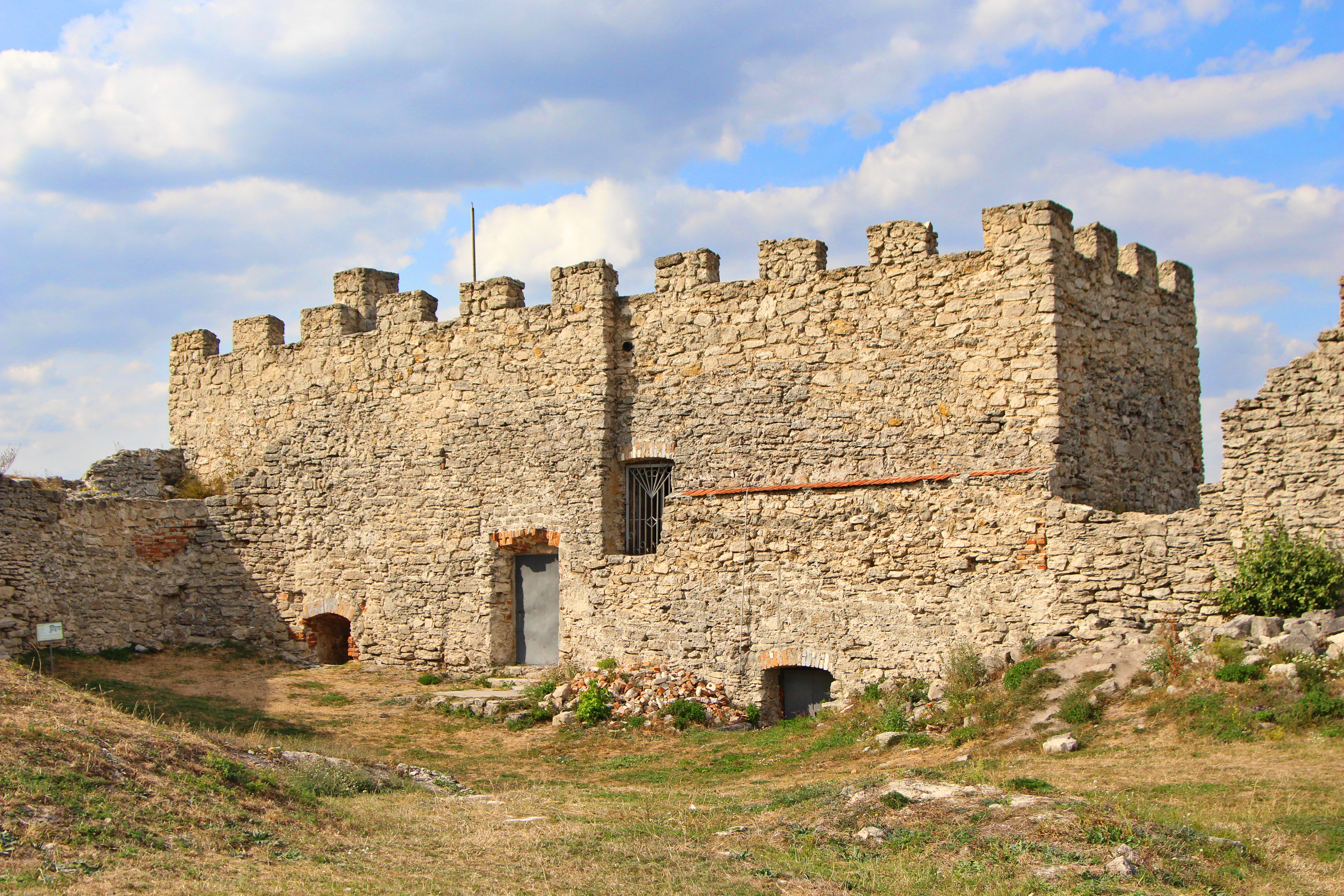
Ruins of the tower

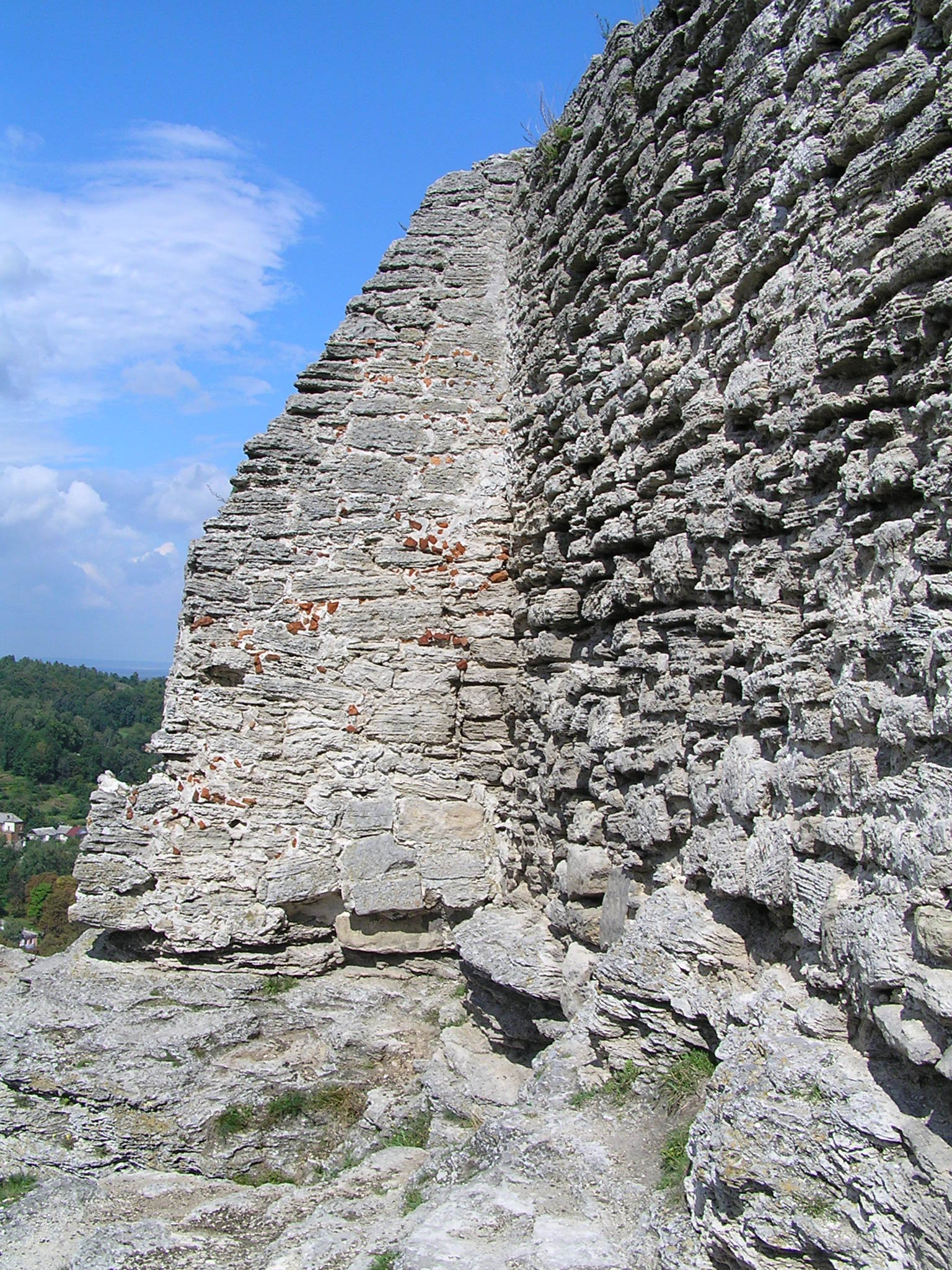
Side of the wall

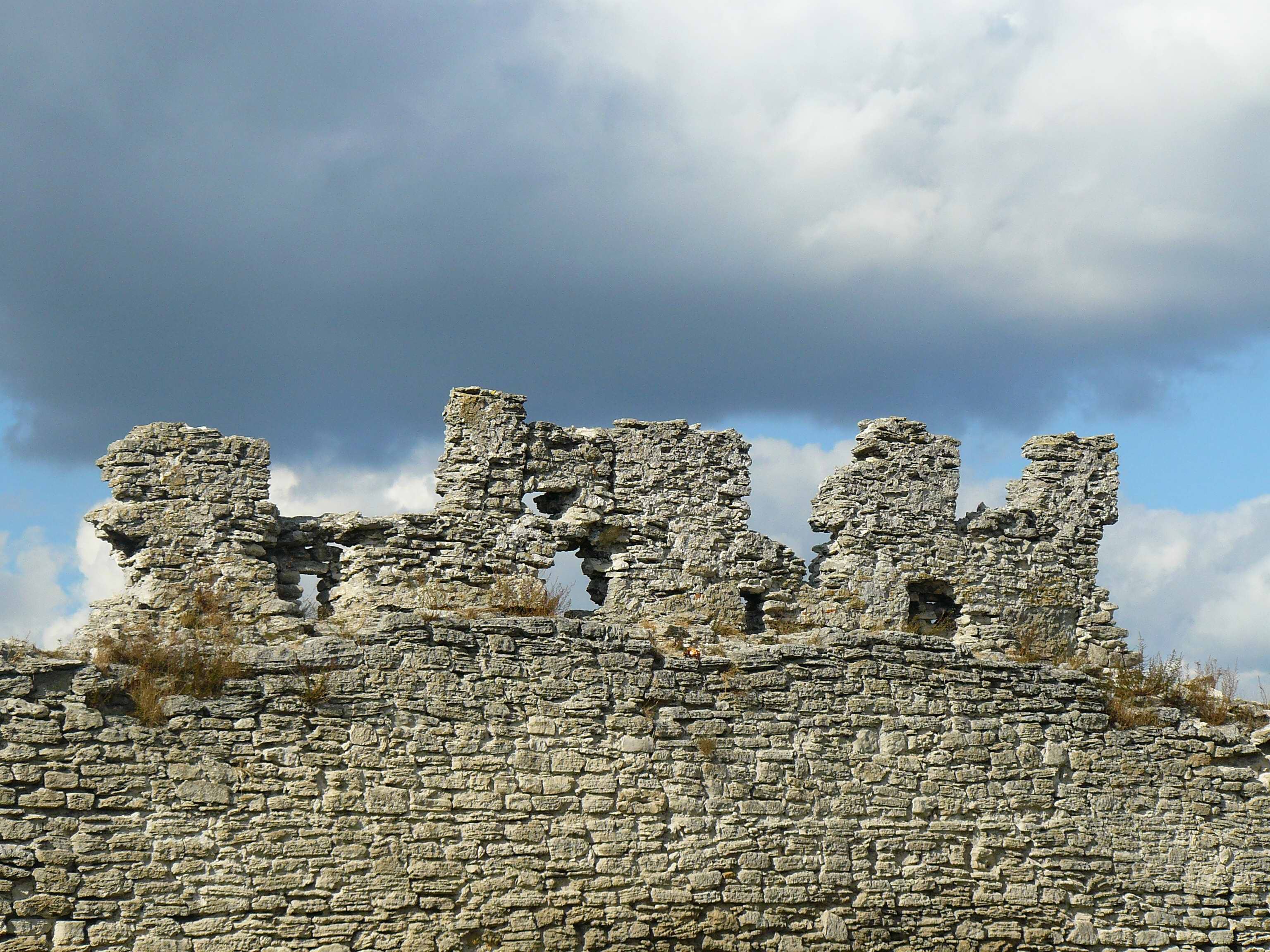
Top of the wall

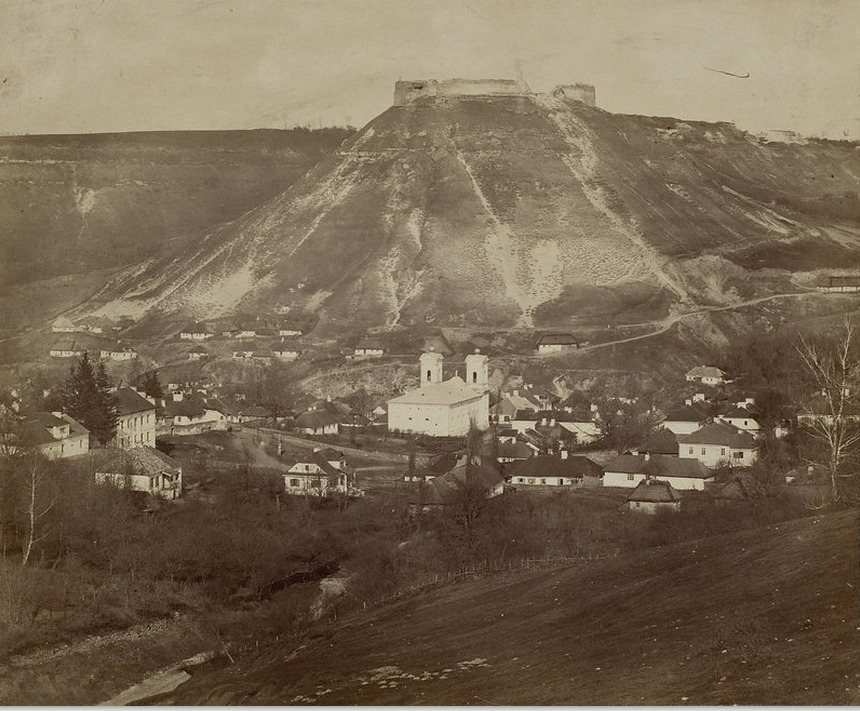
The castle in 19th century
