= List of plants known as mugwort =

Mugwort (Artemisia vulgaris), or common wormwood, is a medicinal and culinary herb native to Eurasia and northern Africa.

Mugwort may also refer to:

== Plants in the genus Artemisia ==
- Artemisia absinthium, – mugwort, wormwood
- Artemisia annua – annual mugwort
- Artemisia argyi - Chinese mugwort, used in traditional Chinese medicine
- Artemisia douglasiana – Douglas mugwort, native to western North America
- Artemisia glacialis – alpine mugwort
- Artemisia indica - Japanese mugwort
- Artemisia japonica - Oriental mugwort
- Artemisia ludoviciana - western mugwort, native to North America
- Artemisia norvegica – Norwegian mugwort
- Artemisia princeps – Japanese mugwort ("yomogi"), Korean mugwort ("ssuk"), used as a culinary herb and in traditional Chinese medicine.
- Artemisia stelleriana – hoary mugwort
- Artemisia verlotiorum – Chinese mugwort
- Artemisia vulgaris - L.–mugwort, felonherb, green-ginger, common wormwood

== Other plants ==
- Tanacetum vulgare, also known as common tansy, native to Eurasia
