= Mugwort =

Genus of flowering plants used as herbs

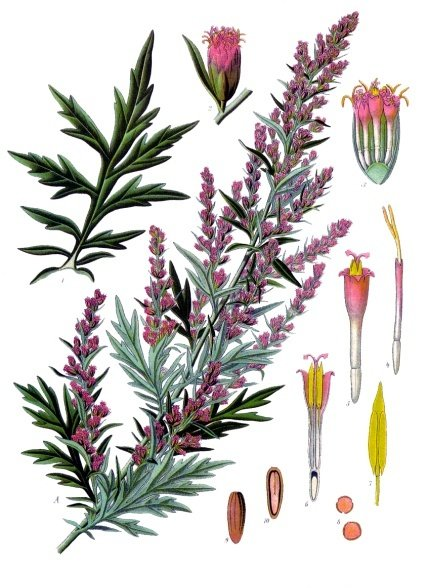
Illustration of Artemisia vulgaris (1897)

Mugwort is a common name for several species of aromatic flowering plants in the genus Artemisia. In Europe, mugwort most often refers to the species Artemisia vulgaris, or common mugwort. In East Asia, the species Artemisia argyi is often called "Chinese mugwort" in the context of traditional Chinese medicine, Ngai Chou in Cantonese or àicǎo (艾草) for the whole plant in Mandarin, and àiyè (艾叶) for the leaf, which is used specifically in the practice of moxibustion. Artemisia princeps is a mugwort known in Korea as ssuk (쑥) and in Japan as yomogi (ヨモギ). While other species are sometimes referred to by more specific common names, they may be called simply "mugwort" in many contexts.

== Etymology ==
The Anglo-Saxon Nine Herbs Charm mentions mucgwyrt. A folk etymology, based on coincidental sounds, derives mugwort from the word "mug"; more certainly, it has been used in flavoring drinks at least since the early Iron Age. Other sources say mugwort is derived from the Old Norse muggi (meaning "marsh") and German wuertz (wort in English, originally meaning "root"), which refers to its use since ancient times to repel insects, especially moths. The Old English word for mugwort is mucgwyrt where mucg-, could be a variation of the Old English word for "midge": mycg. Wort comes from the Old English wyrt (root/herb/plant), which is related to the Old High German wurz (root) and the Old Norse urt (plant).

== Species ==
Species in the genus Artemisia called mugwort include:

- Artemisia absinthium L. — wormwood, traditionally used in the production of absinthe
- Artemisia annua — annual mugwort
- Artemisia argyi H.Lév. & Vaniot — Chinese mugwort, used in traditional Chinese medicine
- Artemisia douglasiana Besser ex Besser — Douglas mugwort or California mugwort, native to western North America
- Artemisia glacialis L. — alpine mugwort
- Artemisia granatensis Boiss. - Sierra Nevadan chamomille, endemic to the Sierra Nevada mountain range in the Iberian peninsula
- Artemisia indica Willd. — Oriental mugwort
- Artemisia japonica Thunb. — Japanese mugwort
- Artemisia lactiflora Wall. ex DC. — white mugwort
- Artemisia norvegica Fr. — Norwegian mugwort
- Artemisia princeps Pamp. — Korean mugwort (ssuk), Japanese mugwort (yomogi), used as a culinary herb and in traditional Chinese medicine
- Artemisia stelleriana Bess. — hoary mugwort
- Artemisia verlotiorum Lamotte — Chinese mugwort
- Artemisia vulgaris L. — common mugwort, used as a culinary herb and medicinally throughout the world

== Uses ==
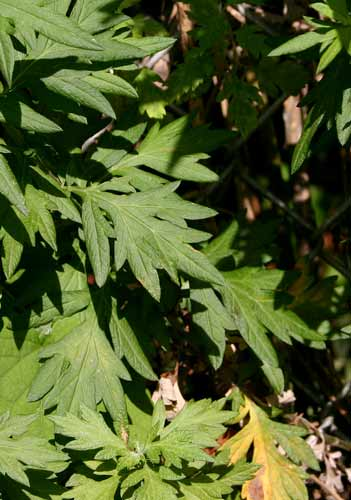
A mugwort leaf with the pointed leaves characteristic of a mature plant

=== Traditional medicine ===
Mugwort has been used in many cultures as a traditional medicine, spiritual, and culinary ingredient since at least the Iron Age. In contemporary culture, mugwort is a common ingredient in Chinese, Japanese, and Korean traditional medicine, where the leaves are used directly as a food ingredient, or to obtain oil extracts, tinctures, or burned in what is called moxibustion. The mugwort plant has been used as an anthelminthic, and is sometimes confused with wormwood (Artemisia absinthium). Mugwort has also been used in folk medicine to relieve sleeplessness, menstrual cramps, induce abortion, and for malaria.

=== Food ===
Aromatic and slightly bitter leaves, as well as young spring shoots, can be eaten raw or cooked. The leaves and buds, best picked shortly before mugwort flowers in July to September, can be used as a bitter flavoring agent to season fat, meat and fish. In Germany in the Iron Age, mugwort was used to flavor beer before the introduction of hops.

=== Essential oil ===
The composition of mugwort essential oil can vary depending on the genus of plant selected, its habitat, as well as the part of the plant extracted and the season of its harvest. Its main components can include camphor, cineole, α- and β-thujone, artemisia ketone (CAS: 546-49-6), borneol and bornyl acetate as well as a wide variety of other phenols, terpenes, and aliphatic compounds. The presence and concentration of thujone varies largely by species, as well as the climactic, and soil conditions where the plant is grown.

=== Insecticide ===
All parts of the plant contain essential oils with all-purpose insecticidal properties (especially in the killing of insect larvae). This is best used in a weak infusion, but use on garden plants is not recommended, as it also reduces plant growth.

=== Incense and tinder ===
Mugwort, known for its pleasant fragrance, has been used as one of the ingredients in incense in East Asia—particularly in Japan, China, and Korea. The downy hairs on the underside of the leaves can be scraped off and used as effective tinder.

== Cultural ==
=== Medieval Europe ===
In the European Middle Ages, mugwort was used as a magical protective herb. Mugwort was used to repel insects – especially moths – from gardens. Mugwort has also been used from ancient times as a remedy against fatigue and to protect travelers against evil spirits and wild animals. Roman soldiers put mugwort in their sandals to protect their feet against fatigue and cramps. Mugwort is one of the nine herbs invoked in the pagan Anglo-Saxon Nine Herbs Charm, recorded in the 10th century in the Lacnunga. Grieve's Modern Herbal (1931) states that "in the Middle Ages, the plant was known as cingulum Sancti Johannis, it being believed that John the Baptist wore a girdle of it in the wilderness...a crown made from its sprays was worn on St. John's Eve to gain security from evil possession, and in Holland and Germany one of its names is 'St. John's plant', because of the belief that – if gathered on St. John's Eve – it gave protection against diseases and misfortunes."

In the Isle of Man, mugwort is known as bollan bane, and is still worn on the lapel at the Tynwald Day celebrations, which also have strong associations with St. John.

=== China ===
There are several references to the Chinese using mugwort in cuisine. The famous Chinese poet Su Shi in the 11th century mentioned it in one of his poems. There are even older poems and songs that can be tracked back to 3 BC. Some names include lóuhāo (蒌蒿) or àicǎo (艾草) in Mandarin. Mugwort can be prepared as a cold dish or can be stir-fried with fresh or smoked meat. The Hakka Taiwanese also use it to make chhú-khak-ké (鼠麹粿), doughy sweet dumplings. Mugwort is also used as a flavoring and colorant for a seasonal rice dish.

In traditional Chinese medicine, mugwort is used in a pulverized and aged form – called moxa in English (from Japanese mogusa) – to perform moxibustion, that is, to burn on specific acupuncture points on the patient's body to achieve therapeutic effects. There is a belief that moxibustion of mugwort is effective at increasing the cephalic positioning of fetuses who were in a breech position before the intervention. A Cochrane review in 2012 found that moxibustion does not reduce the risk of breech presentation at birth compared to placebo, but stressed a need for well-designed randomised controlled trials to evaluate this usage.

=== Germany ===
In Germany, known as Beifuß, it is mainly used to season goose, especially the roast goose traditionally eaten for Christmas.

=== India ===
The plant, called nāgadamanī in Sanskrit, is used in Ayurveda for cardiac complaints as well as feelings of unease, unwellness, and general malaise.

=== Japan ===
Mugwort – or yomogi (蓬) – is used in a number of Japanese dishes, including yōkan, a dessert, or kusa mochi, also known as yomogi mochi(よもぎ餅).

Mugwort rice cakes, or kusa mochi are used for Japanese sweets called daifuku (literally 'great luck'). To make these, take a small amount of mochi and stuff it or wrap it round a filling of fruit or sweetened adzuki (red bean) paste. Traditional daifuku can be pale green, white or pale pink and are covered in a fine layer of potato starch to prevent sticking. When Japanese people smell the scent of mugwort, the first thing that often comes to mind is yomogi mochi.

Mugwort is a vital ingredient of kusa mochi (rice cake with mugwort) and hishi mochi (lozenge rice cake), which is served at the Doll Festival in March. In addition, the fuzz on the underside of the mugwort leaves is gathered and used in moxibustion. In some regions in Japan, there is an ancient custom of hanging yomogi and iris leaves together outside homes in order to keep evil spirits away. It is said that evil spirits dislike their smell. The juice is said to be effective at stopping bleeding, lowering fevers and purging the stomach of impurities. It can also be boiled and taken to relieve colds and coughs.

=== Korea ===
In both North and South Korea, mugwort – ssuk (쑥) – is used in soups and salads. A traditional soup containing mugwort and clams is ssukguk (쑥국), made in spring from the young plants just before they bloom. Another dish is named ssukbeomul (쑥버물), in which the mugwort is mixed with rice flour, sugar, salt and water and is then steamed. It is a common ingredient in rice cakes, teas, soups, and pancakes.

=== North America ===
Indigenous peoples of North America used mugwort for a number of medicinal purposes. Strong, bitter-tasting pasture sagewort tea was taken to treat colds and fevers. Mugwort was used in washes and salves to treat bruises, itching, sores, poison ivy, eczema, and underarm or foot odour. The leaves were dried, crushed, and used as a snuff to relieve congestion, nosebleeds, and headaches. Frequently, to improve taste and absorption, Mugwort Tea is made by crushing the leaves, and steeping with other ingredients. Tarragon plants were boiled to make washes and poultices for treating swollen feet and legs and snow blindness. Some tribes called western mugwort 'women's sage' because the leaf tea was taken to correct menstrual irregularity. It was taken to relieve indigestion, coughs, and chest infections. Western mugwort smoke was used to disinfect contaminated areas and revive patients from comas. Northern wormwood tea was taken to relieve difficulties with urination or bowel movements, to ease delivery of babies, and to cause abortions.

== Side effects ==
=== Allergies ===
Mugwort pollen is one of the main sources of hay fever and allergic asthma in North Europe, North America, and parts of Asia. Mugwort pollen generally travels less than 2,000 meters. The highest concentration of mugwort pollen is generally found between 9 and 11 am. The Finnish allergy association recommends weeding as a method of eradicating mugwort. Weeding mugwort is known to lessen the effect of the allergy, since the pollen flies only a short distance. Cut flowers before they bloom to avoid allergens and reproduction of the plant.

=== Toxicity ===
Mugwort typically contains the neurotoxin compound thujone, though this varies greatly by species and the environmental conditions where the plant is grown. Toxicity to humans is believed to be weak, though some studies have linked high concentrations of thujone to seizures and an abortive effect. The Botanical Safety Handbook suggests the Mugwort not be used during pregnancy unless it is under the supervision of a medical expert. In rare cases, minor allergic skin reactions have been recorded in relation to moxibustion, the burning of dried Mugwort.

== See also ==
- Dysphania ambrosioides, a plant with a similar flavour profile used in North and South American cuisines.
- Eucosma metzneriana, moth that feeds on this plant
- List of plants known as mugwort
- Ssukcha, traditional Korean drink
- Chinese mugwort
