= Boreal sagebrush =

Boreal sagebrush is a common name for several shrubs in the genus Artemisia:

- Artemisia arctica
- Artemisia norvegica
