= Johann Heinrich Hochhuth =

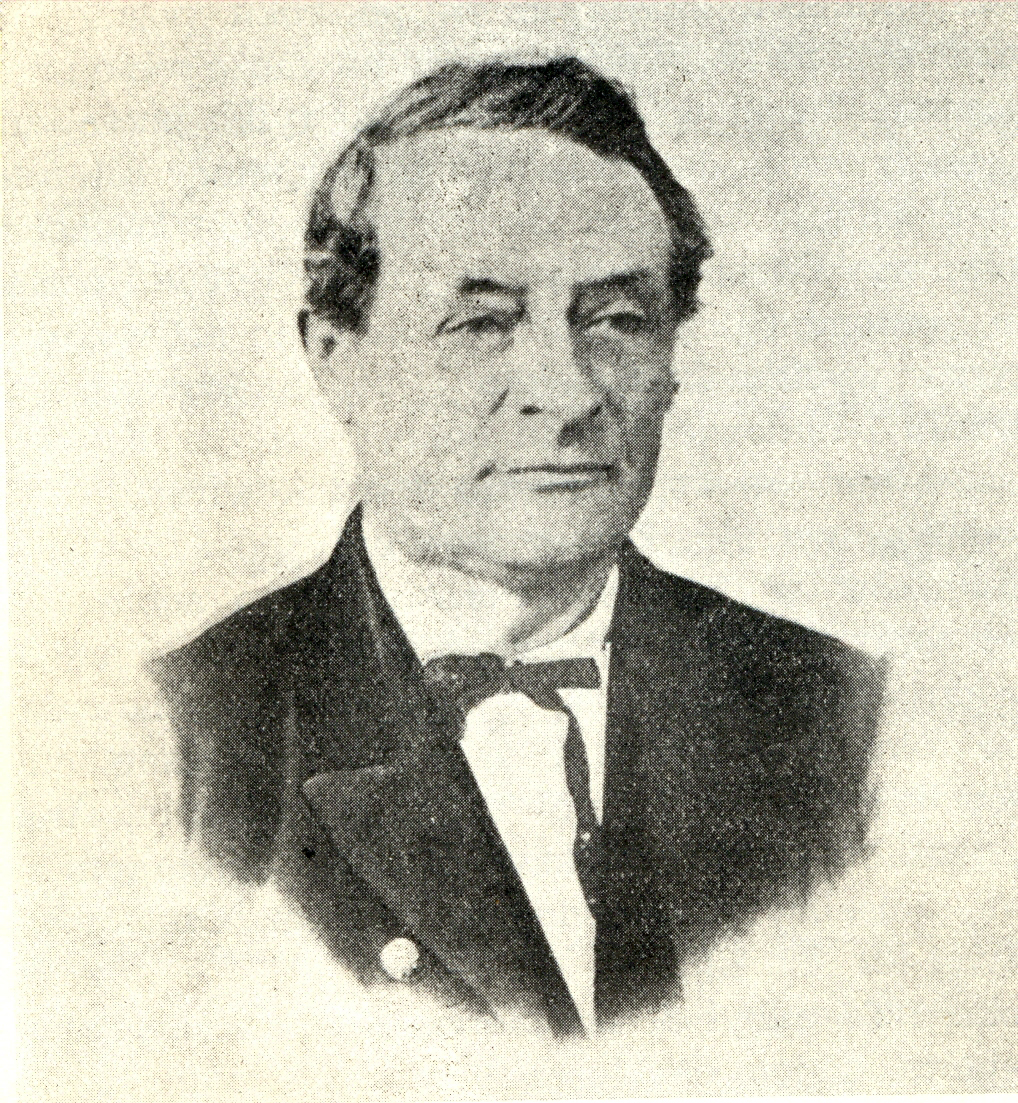

Johann Heinrich Hochhuth (Russian: Йоганн Гайнріх Гохгут; 1811 – June 17, 1872) was a German-born botanist and naturalist who worked in Kiev. He made extensive collections of insects while also working on the development of the Kyiv botanical gardens at St. Volodymyr University. He described numerous species of beetles in journals and wrote articles on economics while also teaching German at the Second Kyiv Gymnasium.

Hochhuth was born in Kassel on the Fulda (Hesse) and after graduating from the local high school he went to Vienna, first at the faculty of medicine and then to biology at the University of Dorpat due to a dislike for anatomy. In 1834 he went to work at Kremenets under the director Wilibald Besser. In 1836 he took up a temporary position as gardener at Kyiv and also worked as a taxidermist. He moved permanently to Kyiv in 1839 and began to work with Rudolf Trautfetter on the botanical garden. He collected insects (his collection holds 17285 specimens representing about 3031 species) and also produced taxidermy bird mounts of nearly 132 specimens. He published on the insect fauna of the region, describing nearly 60 species of weevils and three species - Otiorhynchus hochhuthi Marseul, 1872, Melanobaris hochhuthi Faust, 1882, and Phyllobius hochhuthi Faust, 1883 are named after him. He collaborated with Maximilien de Chaudoir on the faunistics of the Caucasus and Transcaucasia.
