= Absinthium vulgare =

Absinthium vulgare may refer to two different species of plants:

- Absinthium vulgare Lam., a taxonomic synonym for common wormwood (Artemisia absinthium)
- Absinthium vulgare (L.) Dulac, a taxonomic synonym for common mugwort (Artemisia vulgaris)
