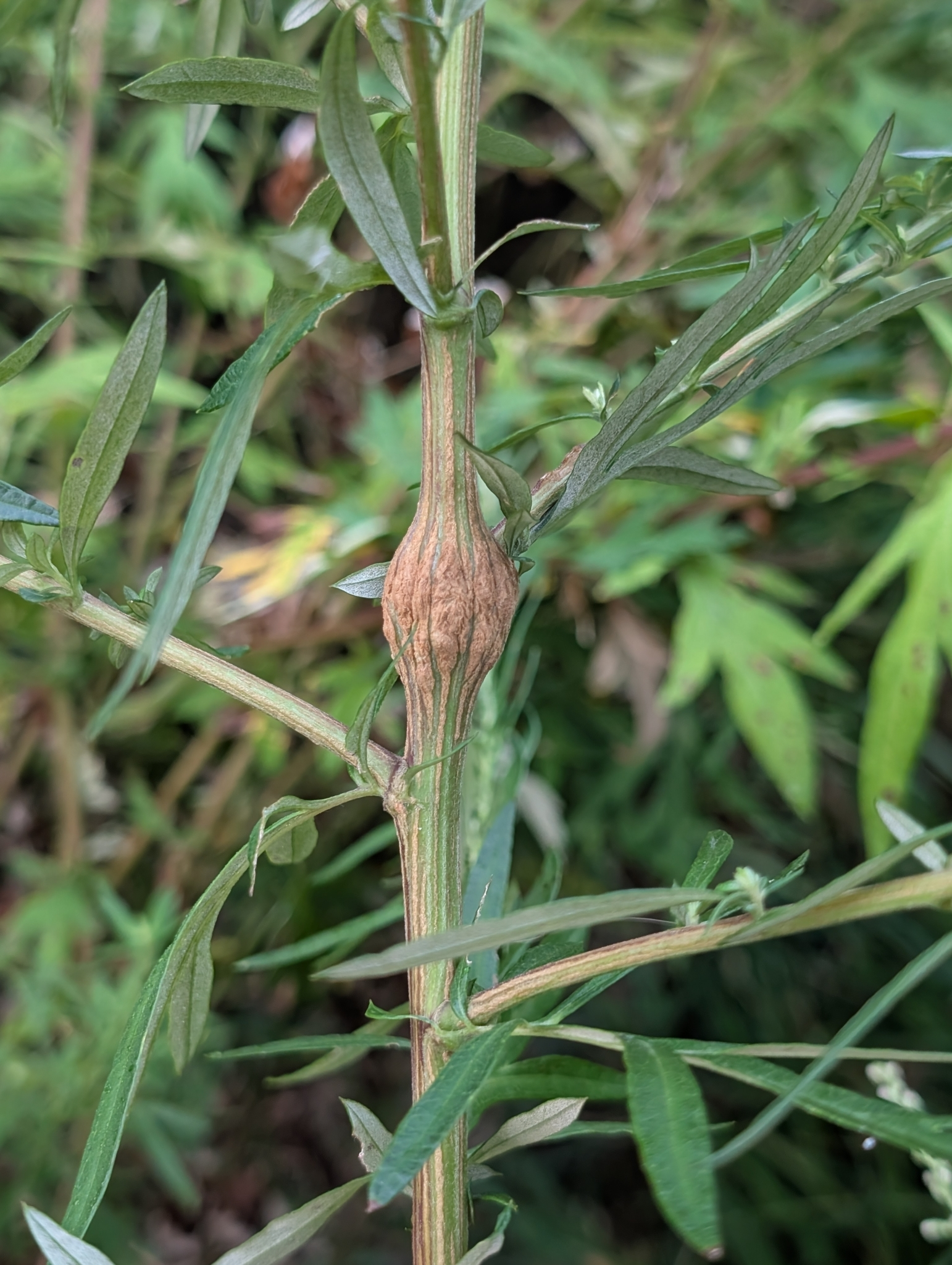

Scientific classification
- Kingdom: Animalia
- Phylum: Arthropoda
- Class: Insecta
- Order: Coleoptera
- Suborder: Polyphaga
- Infraorder: Cucujiformia
- Family: Mordellidae
- Genus: Pseudomordellina
- Species: P. hattorii

Binomial name
- Pseudomordellina hattorii (Tokeji, 1953)

= Pseudomordellina hattorii =

Species of beetle

Pseudomordellina hattorii is a species of tumbling flower beetle in the family Mordellidae. It is known for inducing galls on the stems of plants in the genus Artemisia. Originally known only from Japan, it is now an introduced species in the Eastern United States. It is the first gall-inducing mordellid beetle to be recorded in North America.

== Description ==
The galls induced by P. hattorii form on the stems of its host plant, common mugwort (Artemisia vulgaris), in North America.

== History ==
Observations of unknown stem galls on common mugwort (Artemisia vulgaris) by community naturalists in the Eastern United States led to the discovery of the species' presence in North America.

== Range ==
P. hattorii is native to Japan. It is now established as an introduced species in North America, where previously unknown stem galls associated with the beetle have been observed in the Eastern United States since at least 2011.
