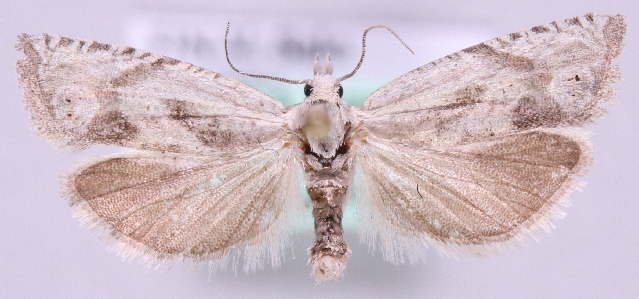

Scientific classification
- Kingdom: Animalia
- Phylum: Arthropoda
- Clade: Pancrustacea
- Class: Insecta
- Order: Lepidoptera
- Family: Tortricidae
- Genus: Eucosma
- Species: E. metzneriana

Binomial name
- Eucosma metzneriana (Treitschke, 1830)

Synonyms
- Conchylis metzneriana Treitschke, 1830; Eucosma metzeneriana; Grapholitha (Semasia) anserana Heinemann, 1863; Thiodia intacta Walsingham, 1900; Eucosma metzneriana joannisiola Dufrane, 1955; Eucosma metzneriana f. osthelderi Dufrane, 1955

= Eucosma metzneriana =

Species of moth

Eucosma metzneriana, the mugwort bell, is a species of moth of the family Tortricidae. It is found on Sicily and in Great Britain, the Netherlands, Belgium, Luxembourg, France, Germany, Denmark, Austria, Switzerland, Italy, the Czech Republic, Slovakia, Slovenia, Hungary, Bulgaria, Romania, Poland, Sweden, Finland, the Baltic region, Ukraine, Russia (European Russia, Siberia and the Russian Far East), North Africa, Transcaucasia, Asia Minor, Iran, Kazakhstan, Kyrgyzstan, Mongolia, China (Henan, Hubei, Guangxi, Tibet, Shaanxi, Gansu, Xinjiang), Korea and Japan.

The wingspan is 17–23 mm. Adults have been recorded on wing from June to July in Europe.

The larvae feed on Artemisia species, including Artemisia vulgaris and Artemisia absinthium. Feeding causes gall formation. The gall has the form of a swelling of the stem. The light coloured frass is ejected out of this gall. The larvae have a pale yellow body and a brown head. Pupation takes place in the stem of the host plant.
