= Kremenets Botanical Garden =

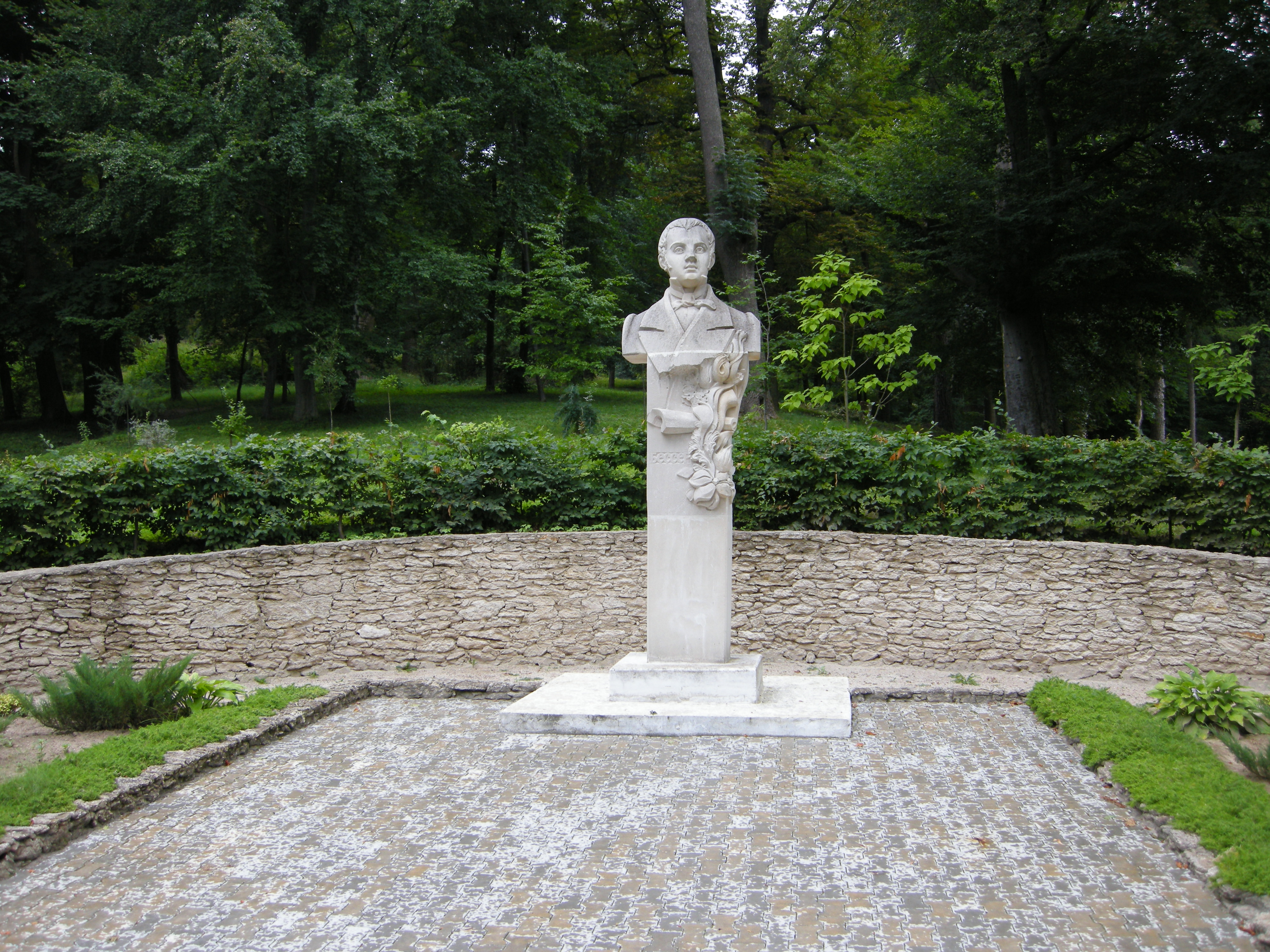
Monument to Austrian-born botanist Wilibald Swibert Joseph Gottlieb von Besser.

Kremenets Botanical Garden (Ukrainian: Кременецький ботанічний сад) is located in the city of Kremenets in the Ternopil Oblast (province) of western Ukraine. The garden was founded in 1806, making it one of the oldest botanical gardens in the country.

Resolution of the Cabinet of Ministers of Ukraine from October 12, 1992 declared the Kremenets Botanical Garden as a protected area of national importance, which aims are to preserve, study, acclimate rare and common flora.

== Description ==
Botanical Garden's area has 200 hectares, most of which – natural landscapes of complex topography with a height difference of 150 meters (maximum absolute height ois the territory of 399 meters, minimum – 255 m). 170 hectares of the territory consist of artificial and natural forest plantations, herbaceous and rock communities. The slopes of the garden covered with hornbeam, oak – hornbeam, larch, pine, pine-birch, ash-maple forests of artificial and natural origin.

== History ==
During 1806-1809, project of Kremenets'kiy Botanical Garden had been formed by famous Irish master of landscape architecture Dionysius Mc Klyer. According to this project garden area was 4.5 hectares. It consisted of the park, rose garden, three orangeries, greenhouses and pharmacist garden. Collected by D. Mc Klyerom collection of living plants totaled 480 species of local flora and 760 exotic plants. The contribution of an Irishman was something that Grain Land Ukraine did not want to let dissipate. To sustain this Irish link and to protect a two-century-old work, Grain Land Ukraine financed a new Irish Corner in the garden. The Irish Corner is planted with plants and trees native to Ireland.

In 1809, the director of the garden became doctor of medicine, botany and zoology, Austrian Wilibald Swibert Joseph Gottlieb von Besser. The area extends to 20 hectares and number of species increased to 1200. In 1810, W. Besser published the first catalog of plants of the botanical garden, which describes the interesting species brought from France, Switzerland, Germany, Belgium, the U.S. and other countries. This catalog include such species as: Canadian pine, Rhododendron anthopogon, Liriodendron tulipifera, Ginkgo biloba, Morus alba, Castanea sativa. Many species was transferred to the botanical garden from private collections and gardens. W. Besser widely practiced exchange seeds and herbarium with the botanic gardens of Kraków, Hamburg, Paris, Hetinhen, Vienna and others. Became famous as a result of systematic publications V. Besser. A clear indication of species richness and uniqueness of the collection of living plants of Kremenets’kiy Botanical Garden was the presence of 241 plant species from Cape floral kingdom in it.

In 1832, the Kremenets Botanical Garden was closed. The main collector base was moved to Kyiv, where it formed the University of St. Vladimir (now Taras Shevchenko National University of Kyiv) and botanical garden with it (now The Fomin Botanical Garden). In 1921-1939 and 1951-1969, attempts were made to open the garden. In 1990, according to the Council of Ministers of Ukraine, the botanical garden was restored. Since 2001, the garden transferred into submission of the Ministry of Ecology and Natural Resources of Ukraine.

== Collection ==
Collection fund of botanic Garden has over 2000 taxa. The collection of trees and shrubs contains 217 species; medicinal – 111 species; fodder plants - 128 species of 29 genders; vegetable – 74 species of 8 genders; flower-ornamental – 220 species of 84 genders, fruit and berry – 66 species, 141 genders. In collection, there are 270 species of the natural flora plants, including 11 listed in the Ukrainian Red book: Neottia nidus-avis (L.) Rich, E. purpurata Smith, Cephalanthera damasonium (Mill.) Druce from the family Orchidaceae, Galanthus nivalis L. from family Amary daceae, Lilium martagon L. from family Liliaceae, Allium ursinum L, Epipactis atrorubens (Hoffm. ex Bernb.) Schult., on the lighter areas occurs A. strictum Schrad, the family AIIiaseae, Botrychium lunaria (L.) Sw. family Lycopodiaceae. Common area is for relics: Melittis sarmatica Klok. the family Lamiaceae, Hedera helix L. the family Araliaceae, grows here and Daphne mezereum L. the family Thymelaeaceae.

Currently, the Botanical Garden has 5 scientific departments: Dendrology, Phytosozology, Department of flower-ornamental plants, Department of acclimatization of fruit crops, Medicinal plants and new plants cultivation department.

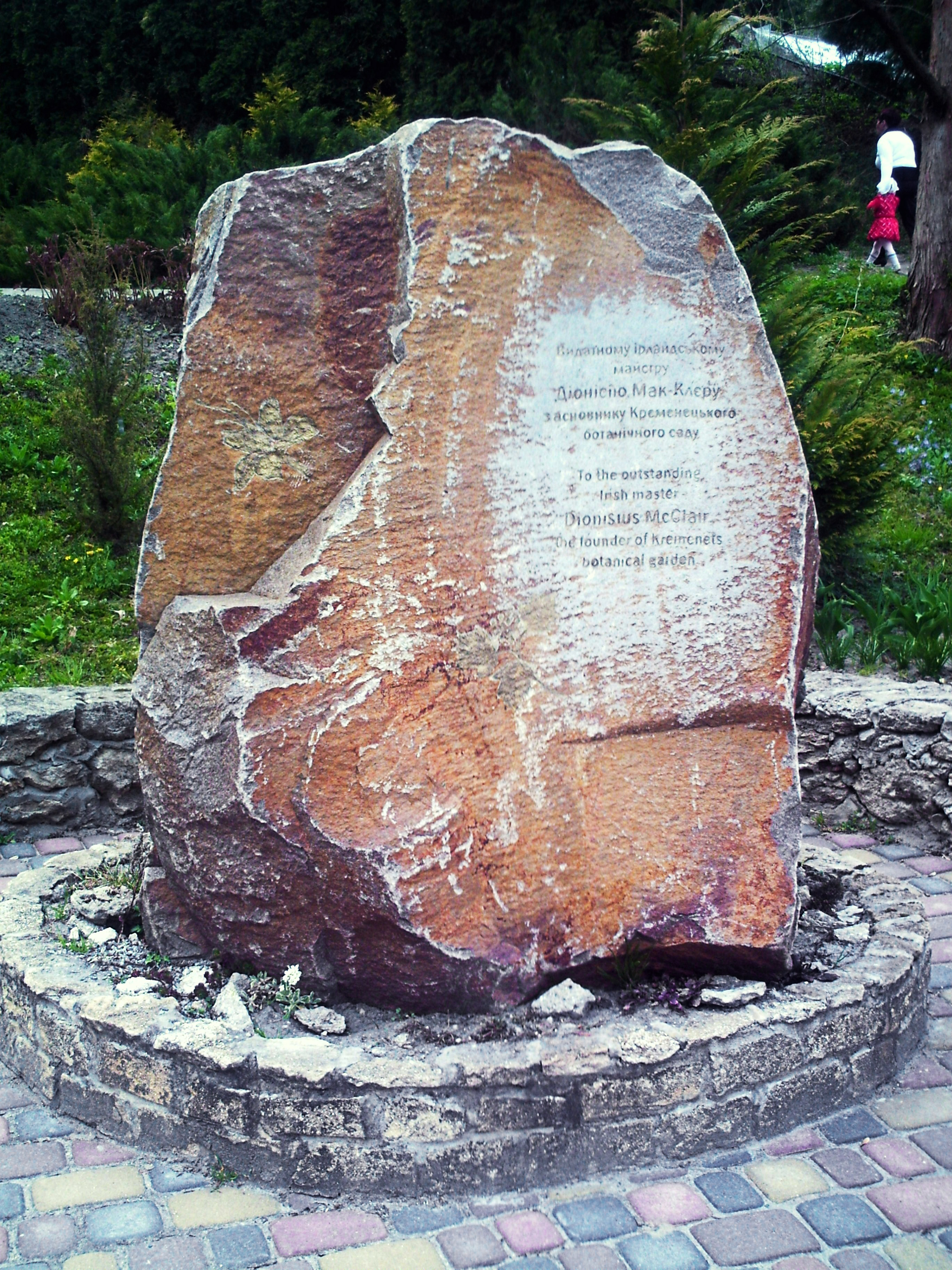
A monument in the Kremenets Botanical Garden.
