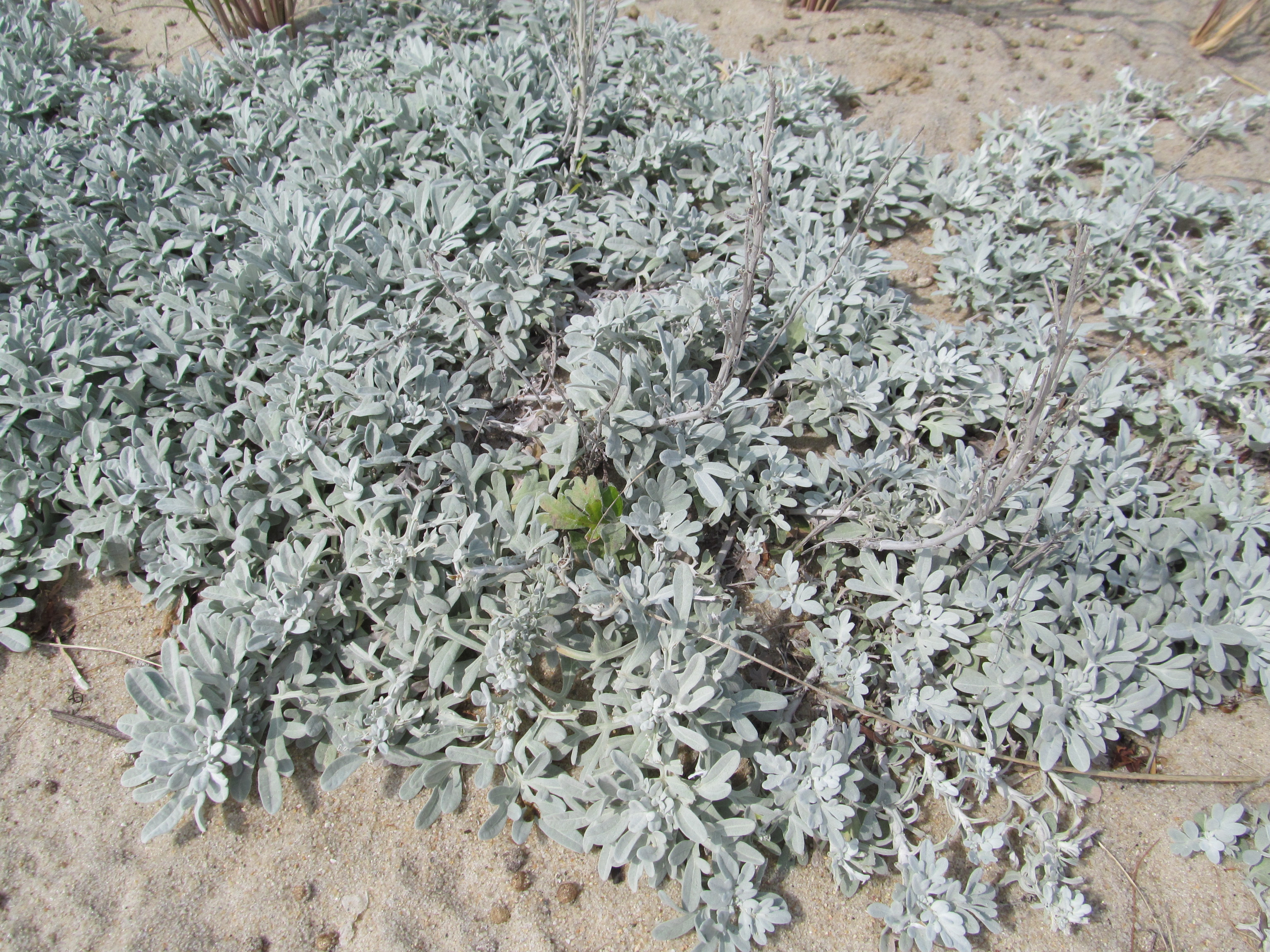
- Coastal Mitigation Nursery; Craigville Massachusetts USA

Scientific classification
- Kingdom: Plantae
- Clade: Embryophytes
- Clade: Tracheophytes
- Clade: Spermatophytes
- Clade: Angiosperms
- Clade: Eudicots
- Clade: Asterids
- Order: Asterales
- Family: Asteraceae
- Genus: Artemisia
- Species: A. stelleriana

Binomial name
- Artemisia stelleriana Besser

Synonyms
- Artemisia chinensis Pursh; Artemisia stelleriana var. sachalinensis Nakai; Artemisia stelleriana var. vesiculosa Franch. & Sav.

= Artemisia stelleriana =

Species of flowering plant

Artemisia stelleriana is an Asian and North American species of plants in the sunflower family. It is native to China (Heixiazi Island in Heilongjiang Province), Japan, Korea, Russian Far East (Sakhalin, Kuril Islands, Yakutia, Kamchatka Peninsula), and the Aleutian Islands in the United States. The species is widely cultivated as an ornamental and naturalized in scattered locations in North America, primarily on coastal dunes and other sandy locations, as well as in Scandinavia. Common names include hoary mugwort, Dusty Miller, beach wormwood, and oldwoman.

== Description ==
The plants have pale-green to white leaves, which are covered on both surfaces with thick trichomes, giving a silver or whitish appearance. The yellow flowers grow in tall clusters and bloom from July to late August. The species thrives in dry and hot climates.

== Cultivars ==
A number of forms have been selected as garden cultivars. 'Boughton Silver' (a.k.a. 'Silver Brocade') is probably the best known cultivar. It is a prostrate form with prettily cut broad white leaves and was originally known as 'Mori's form'. English plantswoman Valerie Finnis (Lady Scott) was given this form by a Mr Mori during her honeymoon in Japan in 1970. It was distributed in UK mainly as 'Mori's form', but was also known as 'Boughton Silver' relating to her husband's garden at Boughton House, Northamptonshire. It was taken to Canada by Bruce McDonald and renamed 'Silver Brocade.'

'Nana' is a more erect (30 cm), but lax stemmed form with less deeply cut silverish leaves. It has been grown for many years in UK where it is used as a filler between other plants in the herbaceous border.

'Elsworth' is a taller (45 cm) more strongly erect stemmed form with more deeply cut silver leaves. It was selected by UK National Artemisia Collection Holder John Twibell c1990.

'Shemya' is a short form (30 cm) with silver green leaves, and was also selected by John Twibell c2013 This form was selected from seed originating from Shemya in the Aleutian Isles (Alaska, USA).
