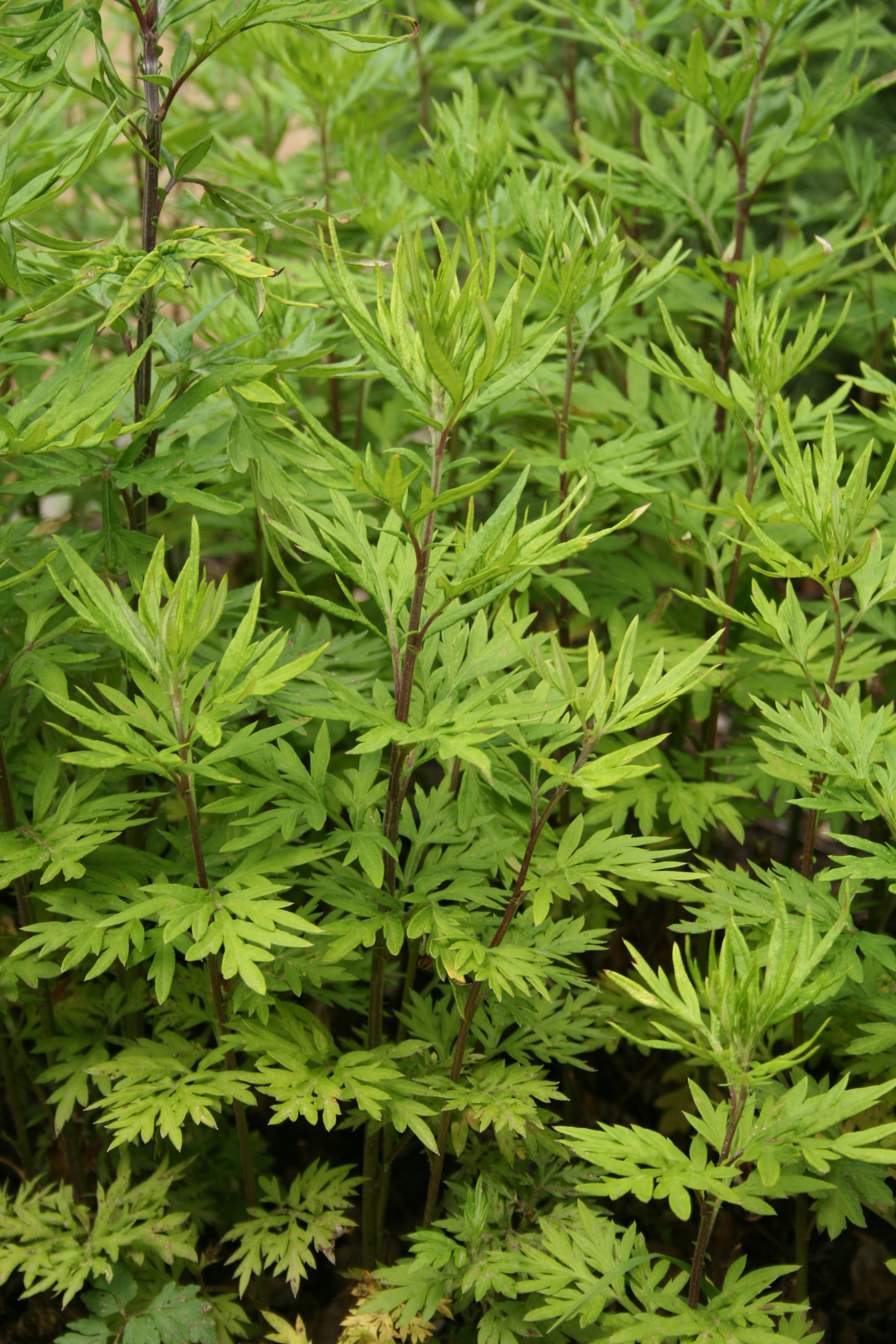

Scientific classification
- Kingdom: Plantae
- Clade: Tracheophytes
- Clade: Angiosperms
- Clade: Eudicots
- Clade: Asterids
- Order: Asterales
- Family: Asteraceae
- Genus: Artemisia
- Species: A. verlotiorum

Binomial name
- Artemisia verlotiorum Lamotte

Synonyms
- Artemisia verlotorum Lamotte, correct spelling according to Tropicos; Artemisia leptostachya DC.; Artemisia selengensis Turcz.

= Artemisia verlotiorum =

Species of flowering plant

Artemisia verlotiorum, the Chinese mugwort, is a species of plant in the sunflower family, widespread across much of Eurasia.

== Etymology ==
It is named for Jean Baptiste Verlot, who first distinguished the plant from Artemisia vulgaris in 1877 and for his brother Pierre Bernard Verlot, and is sometimes referred to as Verlot's Mugwort.

== Description ==
It has oblong reddish to brown capitula, its stems are green and the leaves broader, lighter colored and denser on the stem. The plant is more strongly and pleasantly aromatic than Artemisia vulgaris. It flowers very late in the summer, but reproduces mainly by stolons, thus forming thick groups. Chinese Mugwort shares the same habitat as Artemisia vulgaris, and both are very common.

Artemisia verlotiorum is often confused with Artemisia vulgaris ("common mugwort"), which is closely related.

Differences between	Artemisia verlotiorum	Artemisia vulgaris
Growth form	rhizomes present, plant strongly stoloniferous	rhizomes absent or present, plant not stoloniferous
Leaves	lighter green	dark green
Lobes of adult leaves	lanceolate and entire	ovate-lanceolate and toothed
Synflorescence	green, nodding	brownish, erect
Connective above anther	acuminate	acute
Scent	aromatic	not aromatic
Flowering period	September–November	July–September
Chromosome number	2n = 48	2n = 16
