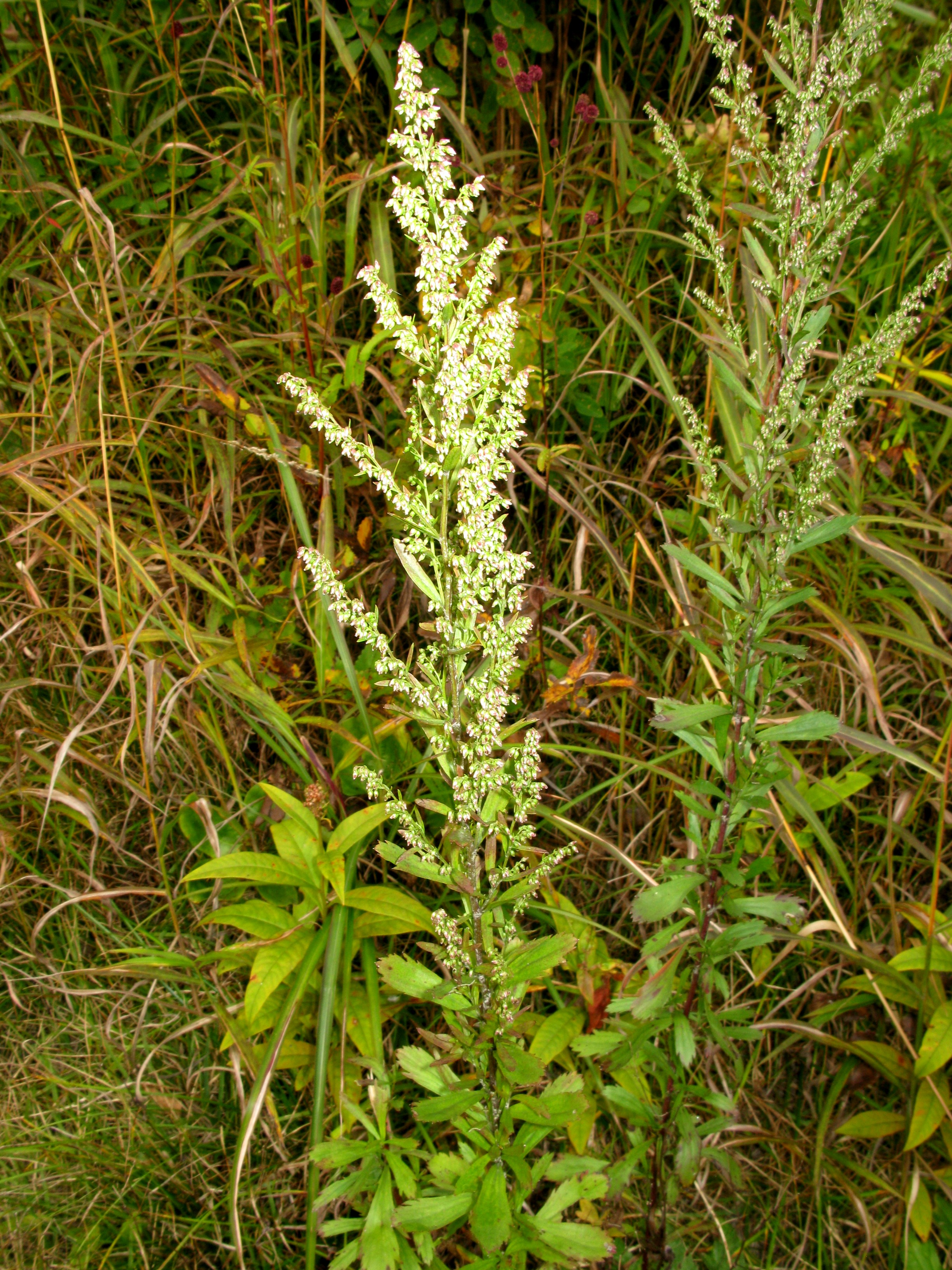

Scientific classification
- Kingdom: Plantae
- Clade: Tracheophytes
- Clade: Angiosperms
- Clade: Eudicots
- Clade: Asterids
- Order: Asterales
- Family: Asteraceae
- Genus: Artemisia
- Species: A. japonica

Binomial name
- Artemisia japonica Thunb.

Synonyms
- Chrysanthemum japonicum (Thunb.) Thunb.; Draconia japonica (Thunb.) Soják; Oligosporus japonicus (Thunb.) Poljakov

= Artemisia japonica =

Species of plant

Artemisia japonica, commonly known as the Japanese wormwood or the Oriental wormwood, is a species of wormwood in the family Asteraceae that is native to Japan, Korea, China, Southeast Asia, and the Indian Subcontinent.

== Description ==
Artemisia japonica is a perennial herb growing up to 50-130 centimeters. The rootstock is thick, woody, and has a strong smell. The leaves are clustered at the rounded apex. The leaf blade is spatulate and oblong-obovate to broadly spatulate or flabellate. The achenes are brown and obovoid. The many nodding capitulas are ovoid or subglobose. 12-15 florets are yellow. The florets are bisexual, meaning that the species has male and female flowers. The flowering is from August to November. It is most commonly found in the months of August, September, and October. It is most commonly found in the countries of China, Japan, and Korea.

Artemisia japonica has four varieties:

- Artemisia japonica var. hainanensis native to China.
- Artemisia japonica var. hallaisanensis native to Korea.
- Artemisia japonica var. japonica native to Japan.
- Artemisia japonica var. manshurica native to Northeastern China.

== Uses ==
The young leaves are cooked and eaten. The adult leaves are used as a digestive. A decoction of the leaves can give hypertension if eaten too much. The juice from the plant is used to treat vaginitis and skin diseases. The powder from drying the plant is used as an incense. It is used in making antitoxifying and antifebrile drugs.

In a study about artemisinin production in Artemisia species, A. japonica had around average levels compared to other species (0.05% to 0.15% artemisinin). It also had more artemisinin in the flowers than their leaves.

== Ecology ==
Globodera artemisiae, a parasite, was first found on Artemisia japonica in September 2020. The parasite is commonly found on Artemisia vulgaris. The plant is grazed by sheep and goats in Ladakh and Lahoul, India, but not liked by yaks in the region.
