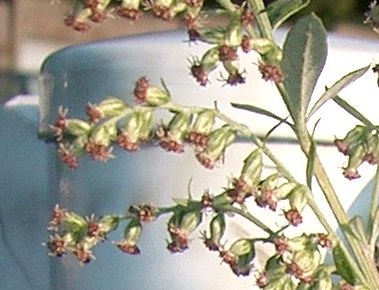

Scientific classification
- Kingdom: Plantae
- Clade: Tracheophytes
- Clade: Angiosperms
- Clade: Eudicots
- Clade: Asterids
- Order: Asterales
- Family: Asteraceae
- Genus: Artemisia
- Species: A. princeps

Binomial name
- Artemisia princeps Pamp.

Synonyms
- Artemisia montana var. nipponica (Nakai) Pamp.; Artemisia parvula Pamp.

= Artemisia princeps =

Species of plant

Artemisia princeps, also commonly called yomogi, ssuk, Japanese mugwort, Korean wormwood, Korean mugwort or wormwood in English, is an Asian plant species in the sunflower family, native to China, Japan and Korea. It is a perennial, very vigorous plant that grows to 1.2 meters (3 ft 11 in). This species spreads rapidly by means of underground stolons and can become invasive. It bears small, buff-coloured flowers from July to November which are hermaphroditic, and pollinated by wind. The leaves are feather shaped, scalloped and light green, with white dense fuzz on the underside.

== Distribution and habitat ==
Artemisia princeps is native to China, Japan and Korea. It has been introduced into Belgium and the Netherlands. It grows in a variety of habitats including roadsides, slopes, valleys and riverbanks.

== As food ==
Leaves and young seedlings can be eaten raw or cooked. They can also be used in salads and soups after removal of the bitterness.

=== Japan ===
In Japan the herb is used to flavour glutinous rice dumplings called kusa mochi (草餅) or yomogi mochi (蓬餅), or rice flour dumplings called kusa dango (草団子). The young leaves can be lightly boiled before being pounded and added to impart a pleasant colour, aroma and flavour. Because of this use, the species is also called mochigusa (餅草, though it is also called mogusa in reference to its use in moxibustion). The plant is also actively grown in the state of Hawaii, and used for making the herbal mochi by residents of Japanese descent.

The leaves are occasionally blanched and added to soups or rice in Japanese cuisine.

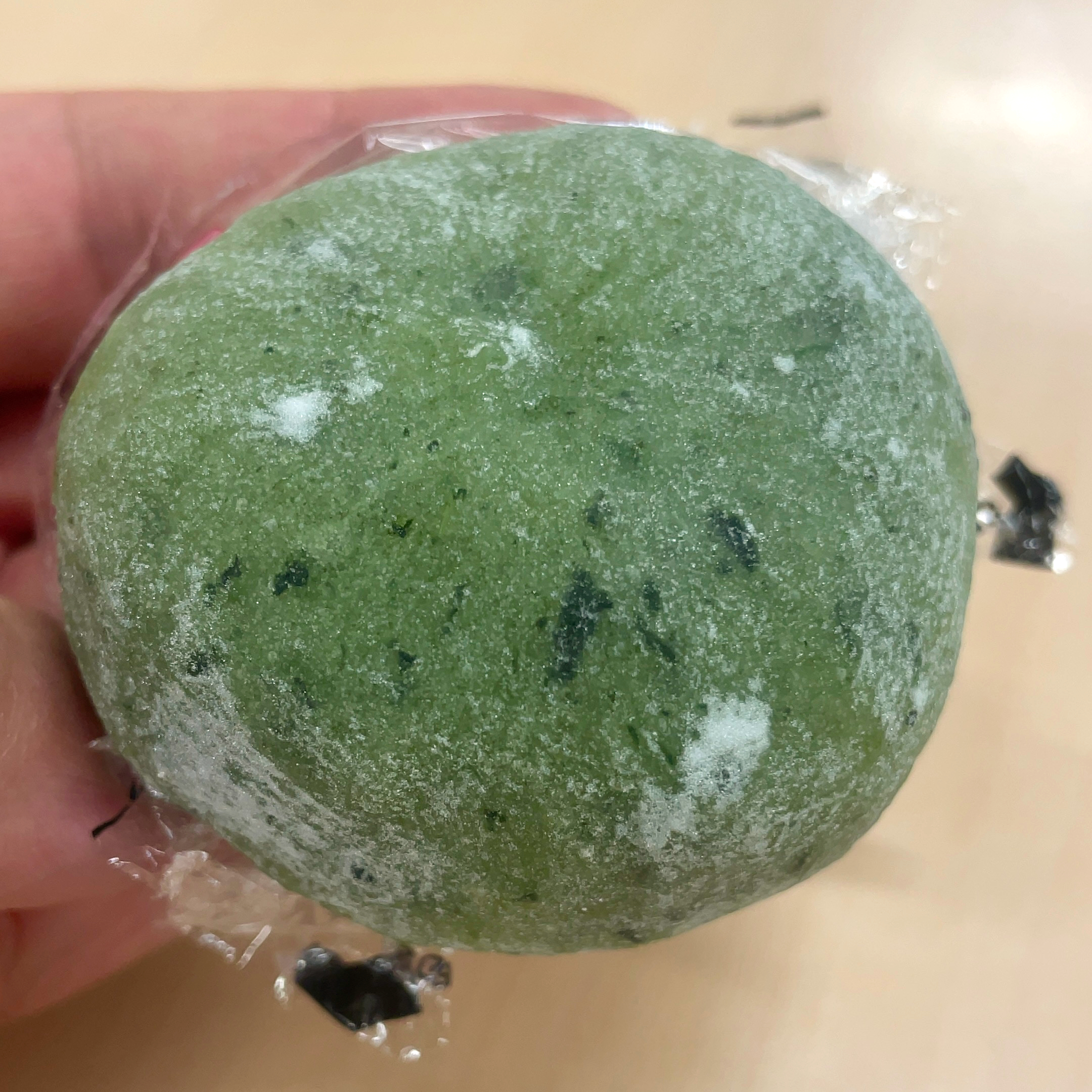
Kusa mochi

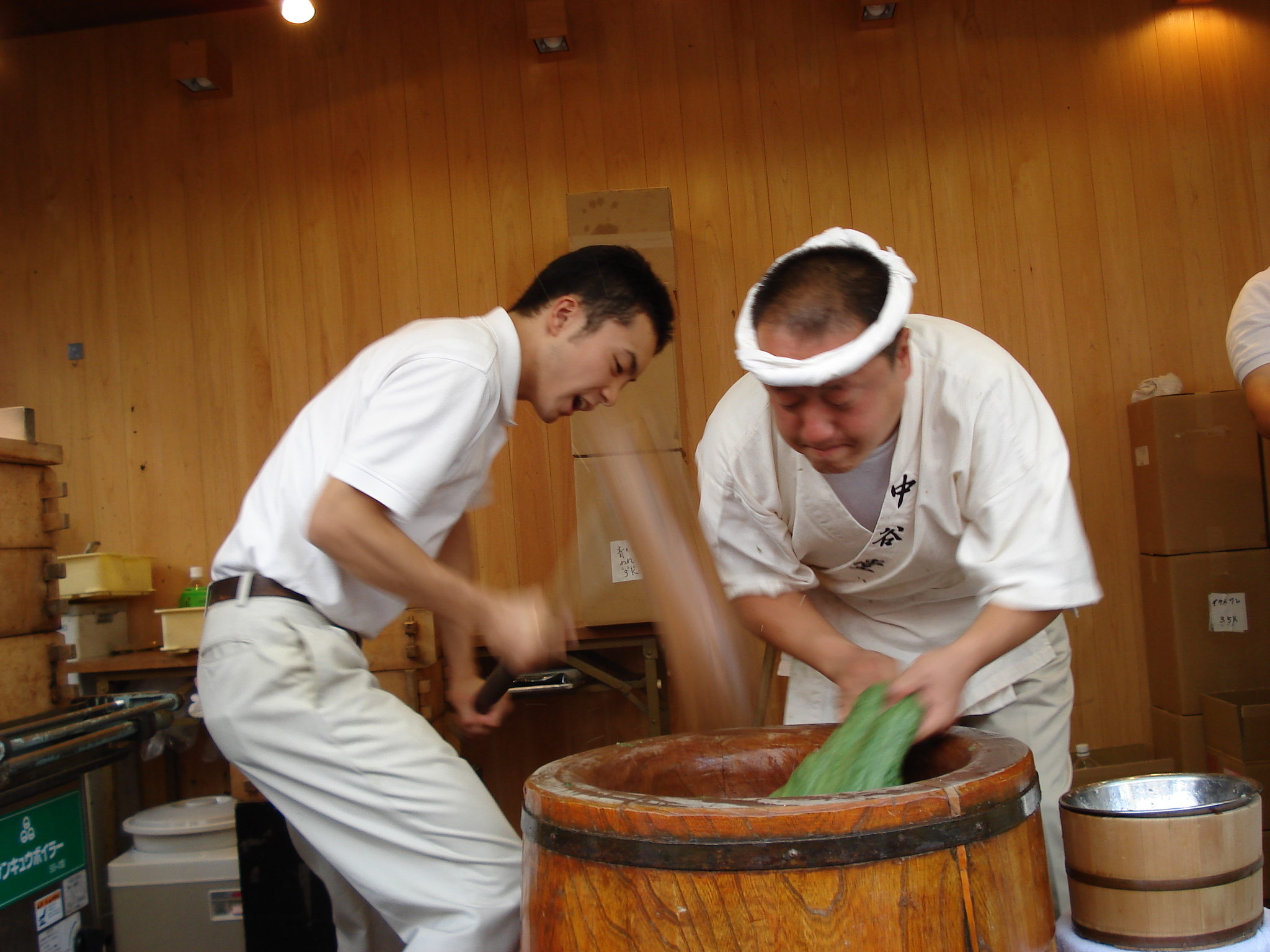
Kusa mochi being made by pounding

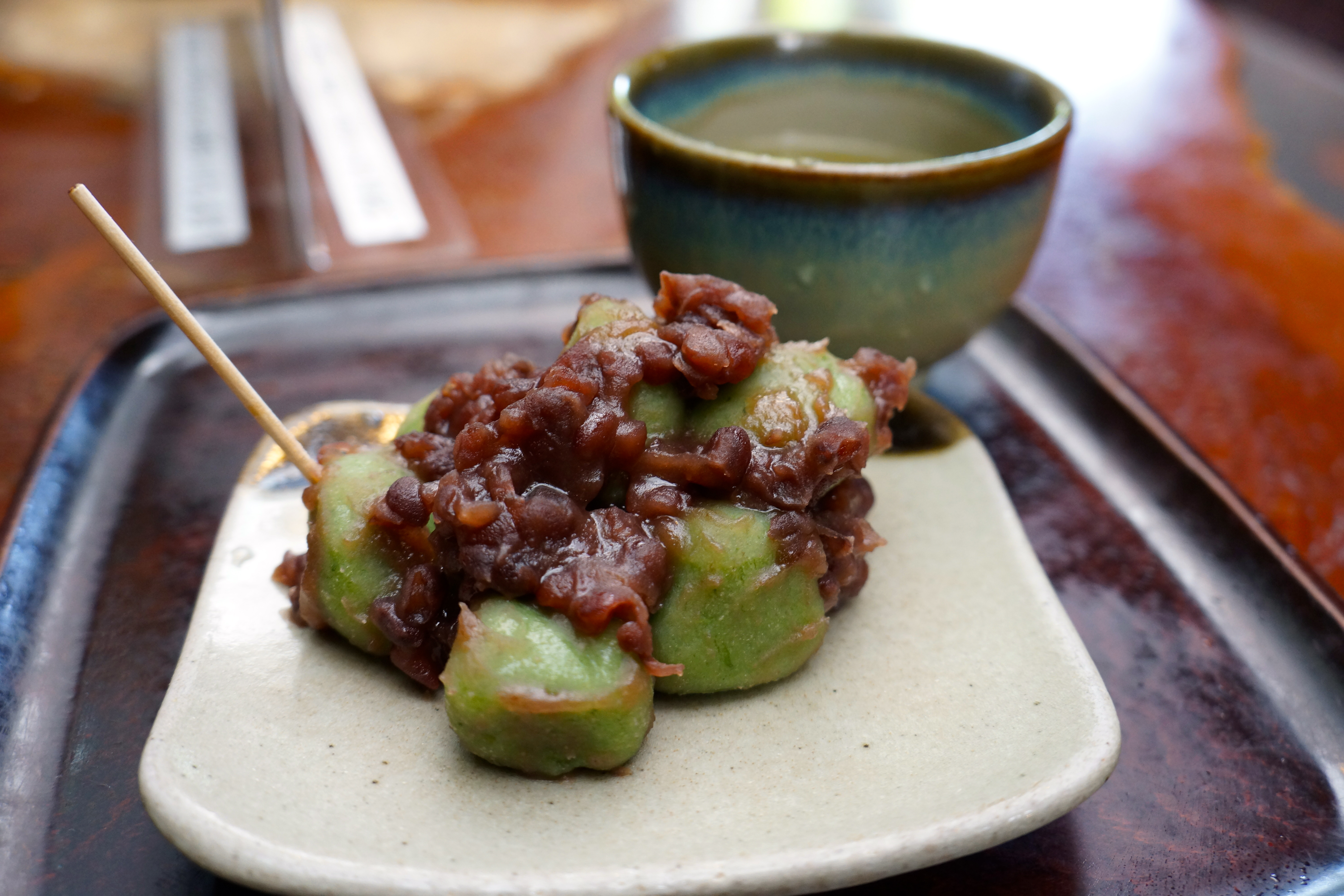
Kusa dango (rice dumplings) with anko

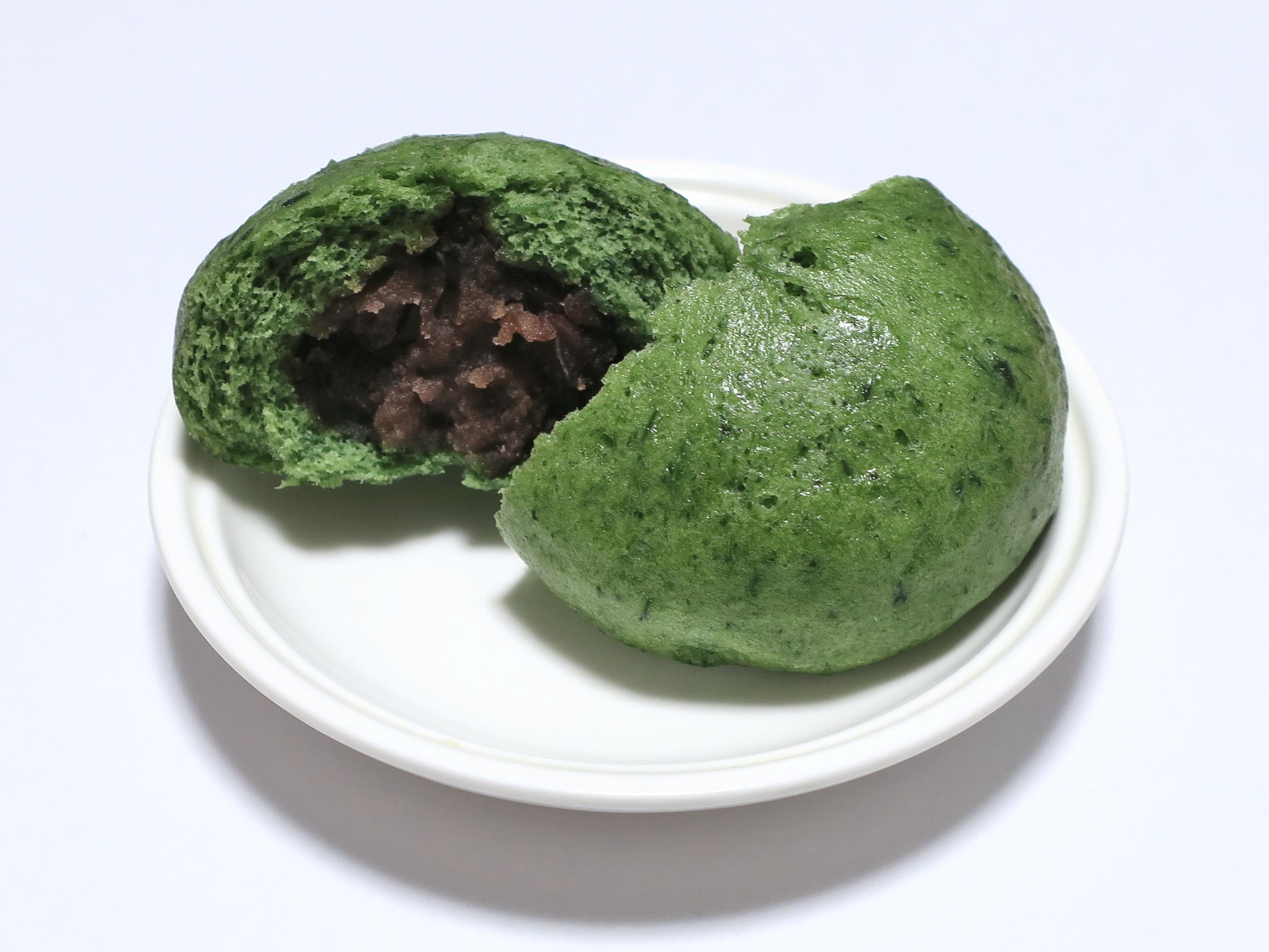
Yomogi manjū

=== Korea ===
Mugwort, referred to as ssuk (쑥) in Korean, is widely used in Korean cuisine as well as in traditional medicine (hanyak). In spring, which is the harvesting season, the young leaves of mugwort are used to prepare savory dishes such as jeon (Korean-style pancakes), ssuk kimchi, (쑥김치), ssukguk (쑥국, soup made with ssuk). Most commonly, however, fresh mugwort as well as dried leaves ground into powder are a characteristic ingredient in various types of tteok (rice cakes). Today, ssuk also adds flavor and color to more contemporary desserts and beverages, e.g. ice cream, breads, cakes, mugwort tea (ssukcha 쑥차) and ssuk latte (쑥라떼).

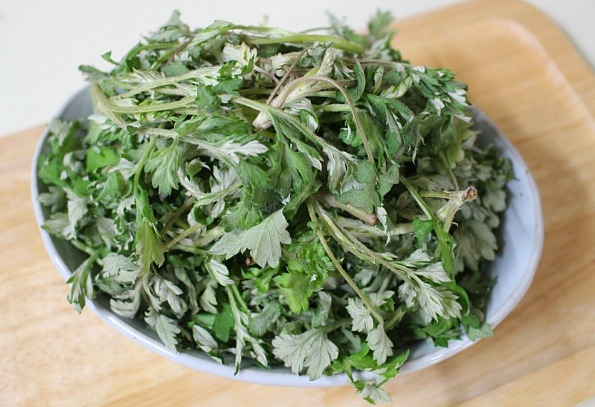
Ssuk (Korean mugwort)

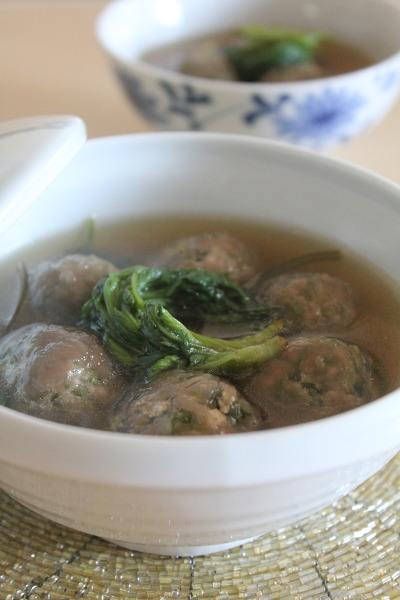
Aetang (mugwort dumpling soup)

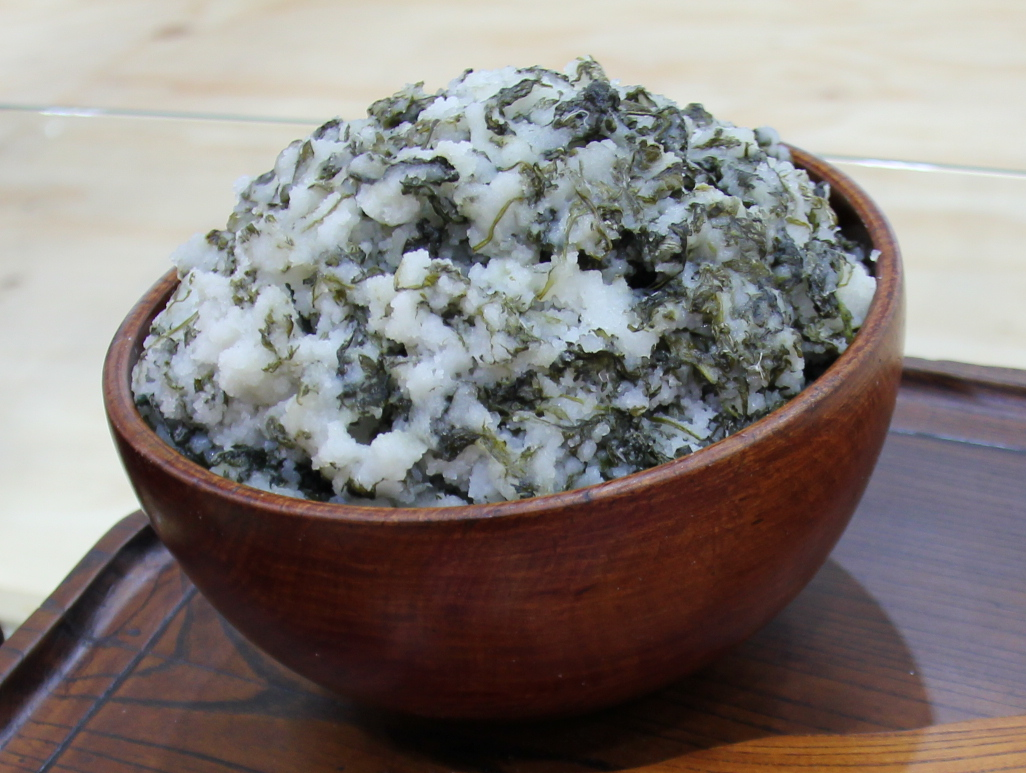
Ssuk-beomuri (mugwort rice cakes)

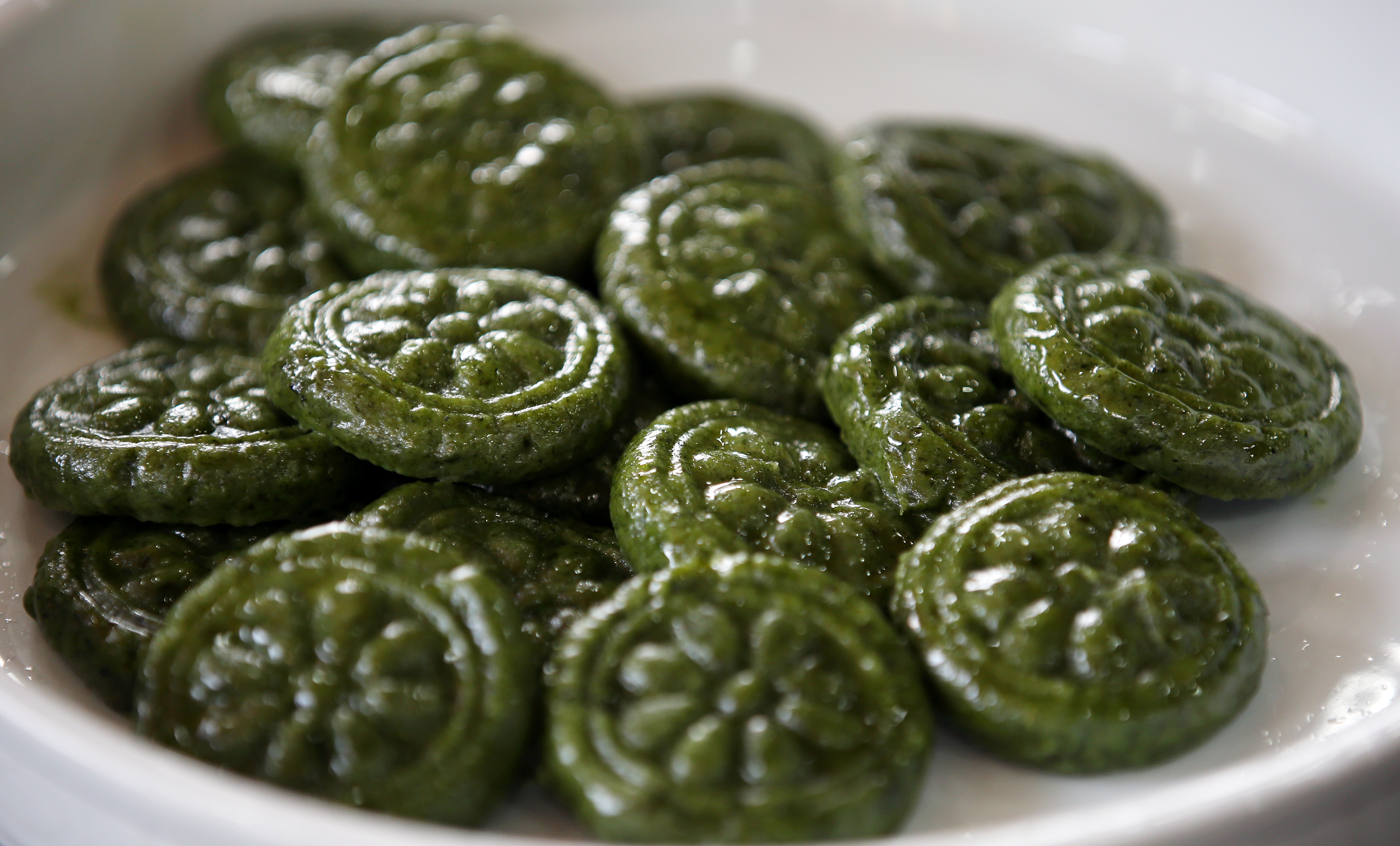
Ssuktteok (mugwort rice cakes)

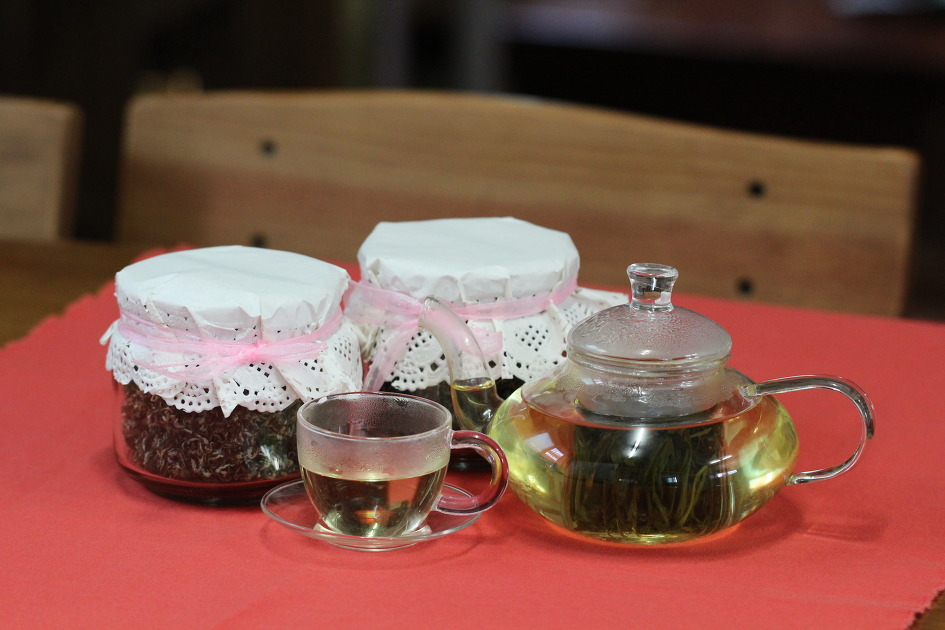
Ssukcha (mugwort tea)

=== China ===
In China it is known as huanghua ai (黄花艾, literally yellow-flower mugwort).

== As medicine ==
Artemisia princeps is one of the species of mugwort used in moxibustion, a traditional medical practice of China, Korea, Mongolia, Tibet, Nepal and Vietnam.

== In culture ==
In Korea, it is called ssuk (쑥) or tarae ssuk (타래쑥) which is deeply related to the mythical figure of Tan'gun (단군신화). According to the Samguk yusa, Tan'gun established Gojoseon in 2333 BCE. He was said to be born from the union of the Ungnyeo ('bear-woman') with Hwanung, son of Haneunim, god of the heavens. While Tan'gun is a mythological figure, some interpret his legend as a reflection of the sociocultural conditions of the kingdom's early development.

To ancient inhabitants of Korea, ssuk was one of the foods believed to have medicinal or religious value. The Ungnyeo transformed herself from a bear into a woman by eating nothing but twenty cloves of garlic and a bundle of ssuk for 100 days.

== See also ==
- List of kampo herbs
