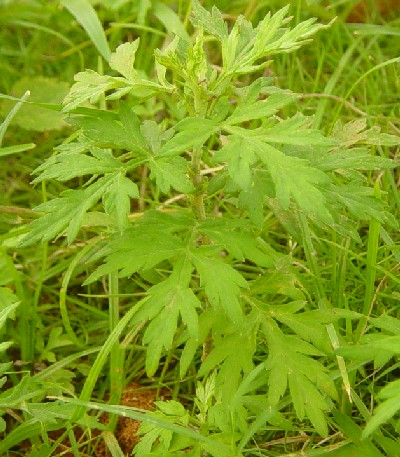

Scientific classification
- Kingdom: Plantae
- Clade: Tracheophytes
- Clade: Angiosperms
- Clade: Eudicots
- Clade: Asterids
- Order: Asterales
- Family: Asteraceae
- Genus: Artemisia
- Species: A. argyi

Binomial name
- Artemisia argyi H.Lév. & Vaniot

Synonyms
- Artemisia chiarugii Pamp.; Artemisia handel-mazzettii Pamp.; Artemisia nutans Nakai; Artemisia nutantiflora Nakai ex Pamp.

= Artemisia argyi =

Species of mugwort daisy

Artemisia argyi, commonly known as silvery wormwood or Chinese mugwort, is a herbaceous perennial plant with a creeping rhizome. It is native to China, Korea, Mongolia, Japan, and the Russian Far East (Amur Oblast, Primorye). It is known in Chinese as àicǎo (艾草) or ài yè (艾葉) or ài hāo (艾蒿), in Japanese as Chōsen yomogi (朝鮮蓬 [et al.], lit. "Korean wormwood/mugwort") and in Korean as Hwanghae ssuk (황해쑥; 黃海쑥; lit. "Yellow Sea mugwort"). It is used in herbal medicine for conditions of the liver, spleen and kidney.

== Description ==
Artemisia argyi is an upright, greyish, herbaceous perennial about one metre tall, with short branches and a creeping rhizome. The stalked leaves are ovate, deeply divided and covered in small, oil-producing glands, pubescent above and densely white tomentose below. The lower leaves are about six centimetres long, bipinnate with wide lanceolate lobes and short teeth along the margins. The upper leaves are smaller and three-partite, and the bracteal leaves are simple, linear and lanceolate. The inflorescence is a narrow leafy panicle. The individual flowers are pale yellow, tubular, and clustered in spherical turned-down heads. The central flowers are bisexual while the marginal flowers are female. The petals are narrow and folded cylindrically and the bracts have a cobwebby pubescence. The whole plant is strongly aromatic.

== Habitat ==
This wormwood is a xerophile, growing on dry mountain slopes, steep river banks, the edges of oak woods, coastal scrub, wasteland and along road and railway verges. The plants do better and are more aromatic when they grow on poor dry soil.

== Medicinal use ==
Wormwood leaves are gathered on a warm dry day in spring and summer when the plant is in flower and dried in the shade. In traditional Chinese medicine, they are considered to have bitter, pungent and warm properties and to be associated with the liver, spleen and kidney meridians. The leaves are used as an antiseptic, expectorant, febrifuge and styptic. The herb is considered to increase the blood supply to the pelvic region and stimulate menstruation, help treat infertility, dysmenorrhea, asthma and coughs. Another use is in moxibustion, a form of healing in which the herb is burned in cones or sticks or as a compressed ball set on the top of an inserted acupuncture needle. Boiling water can be poured onto the ground up leaves and used in a decoction, alone or with other substances, and the fresh leaf can be crushed and blended and a juice extracted. A volatile oil can be extracted from the leaves and used in the treatment of asthma and bronchitis for which purpose it is sprayed onto the back of the throat and brings rapid relief. The leaves have an antibacterial action and have been shown to be effective against Staphylococcus aureus, Bacillus dysenteriae, Bacillus subtilis, Bacillus typhi, Escherichia coli and Pseudomonas.

== Research ==
- Ninety–six volatile constituents have been identified from the leaves of A. argyi and certain other species of wormwood including alpha-thujene, 1,8-cineole, camphor and artemisia alcohol.
- Nearly fifty volatile constituents have been identified from A. argyi flowers, and it is suggested that therapeutic use of the flowers may be just as effective as using the leaves.
- A methanol extract prepared from aerial parts of the plant strongly reduced the mutagenicity of Salmonella typhimurium.
- An extract of A. argyi was shown to have antifungal activity against Botrytis cinerea and Alternaria alternata which cause deterioration of fruit and vegetables in storage.
- Flavones isolated from an extract of the herb were shown to have an anti-tumour effect.
- A study examined the clinical efficacy of moxibustion, analyzed the chemical compositions of the leaf of different strains of A. argyi, examined the best mode of delivery and how to enhance the therapeutic effects of this treatment.

== Traditional use ==
The fine fibers of the plant have been used as a binding agent for the seal stamping paste. The stamps, held with deep esteem, have a history of thousands of years of use in China. They adorn documents, calligraphy, and artwork.

== Toxicity ==
It has been reported to be toxic, but there is no scientific evidence for this.
