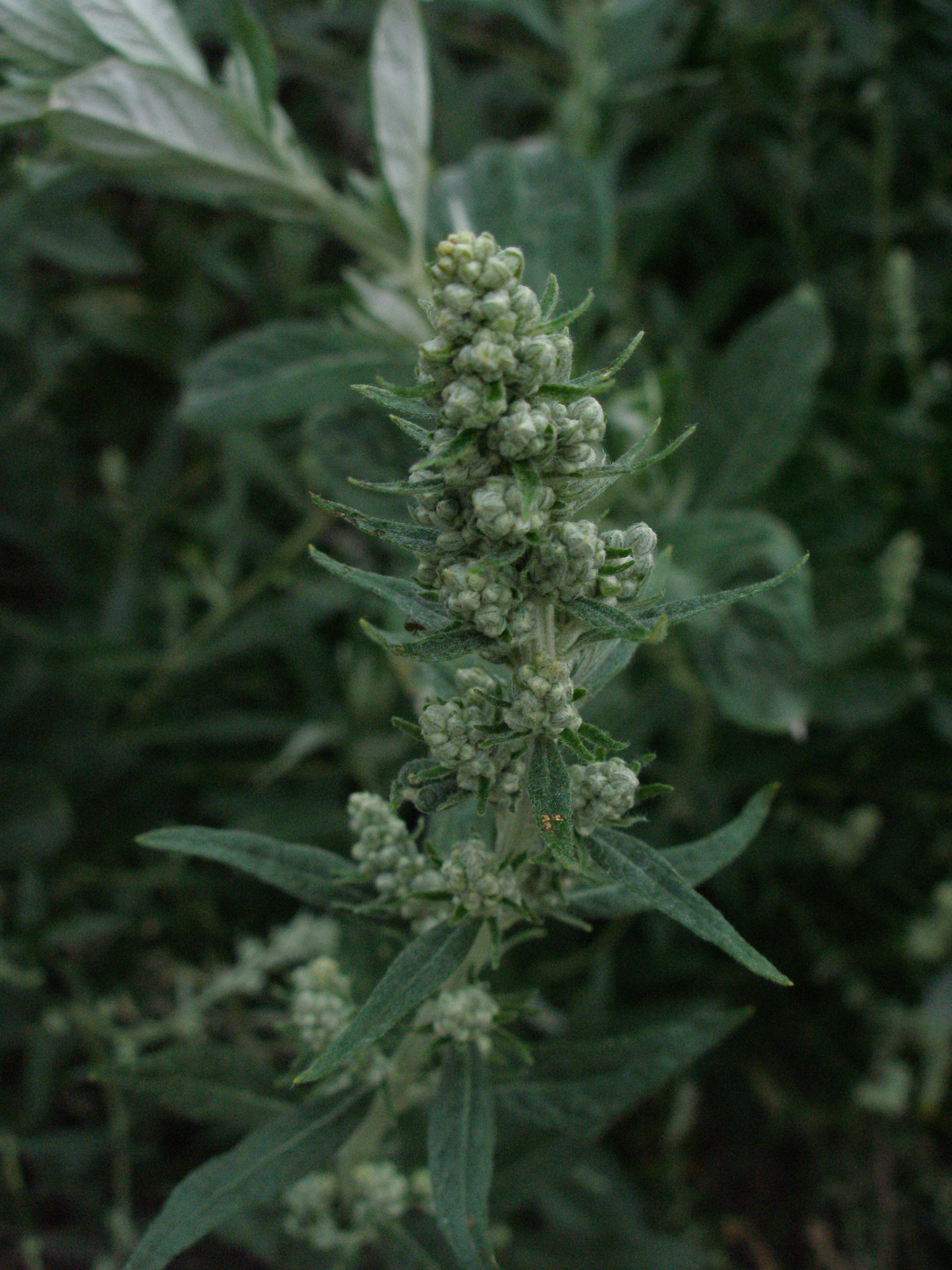

Conservation status
- Secure (NatureServe)

Scientific classification
- Kingdom: Plantae
- Clade: Embryophytes
- Clade: Tracheophytes
- Clade: Angiosperms
- Clade: Eudicots
- Clade: Asterids
- Order: Asterales
- Family: Asteraceae
- Genus: Artemisia
- Species: A. douglasiana

Binomial name
- Artemisia douglasiana Besser ex Besser

Synonyms
- List: Artemisia heterophylla Besser; Artemisia campestris var. douglasiana (Besser ex Hook.) B.Boivin; Artemisia caudata var. douglasiana (Besser) B.Boivin; Artemisia commutata var. douglasiana (Besser) Besser; Artemisia desertorum var. douglasiana Besser ex Hook.; Artemisia ludoviciana var. douglasiana (Besser) D.C.Eaton; Artemisia vulgaris subsp. douglasiana (Besser) H.St.John; Artemisia vulgaris var. heterophylla (H.St.John) Jeps.

= Artemisia douglasiana =

Species of flowering plant

Artemisia douglasiana, known as California mugwort, Douglas's sagewort, or dream plant, is a western North American species of aromatic herb in the sunflower family.

== Distribution and habitat ==
The herbaceous perennial is native to the Western United States in California, Idaho, Nevada, Oregon, and Washington; and in northwestern Baja California, Mexico.

The plant prefers direct sunlight and moist soils, but tolerates shady areas and dry soils. It occupies hardiness zones 6a to 10b and occurs at elevations ranging from 0–3080 meters. A. douglasiana is often found in ditches and streambanks.

== Description ==
Artemisia douglasiana is dicot, and a perennial forb. Its stems grow from a substantial colony of rhizomes which require a minimum soil depth of 16 cm and can grow in fine to coarse soils. The stems grow erect and range in height from 0.5–2.5 metres (1.6–8.2 ft).

Its grey-green leaves are evenly spaced, elliptical, and lobed at the tips. The appearance of the 3–5 lobes at the tips of its leaves may range from being seemingly absent to being highly defined. Its leaves have been shown to contain thujone and cineole.

During its bloom period, which ranges from May to October, the plant features bell-shaped clusters of flowers containing 5–9 pistillate flowers and 6–25 disk flowers.

Although A. douglasiana can reproduce from seed, it is primarily propagated from division and spreading of its underground rhizomes. The extensive rhizomes help prevent erosion by stabilizing streambanks. A. douglasiana is susceptible to infection by Xylella fastidiosa which causes Pierce's disease.

=== Galls ===
This species is host to the following insect and mite induced galls:

- Aceria abalis Keifer leaf gall mite (see image)
- Rhopalomyia occidentalis (Felt, 1916) leaf midge

external link to gallformers

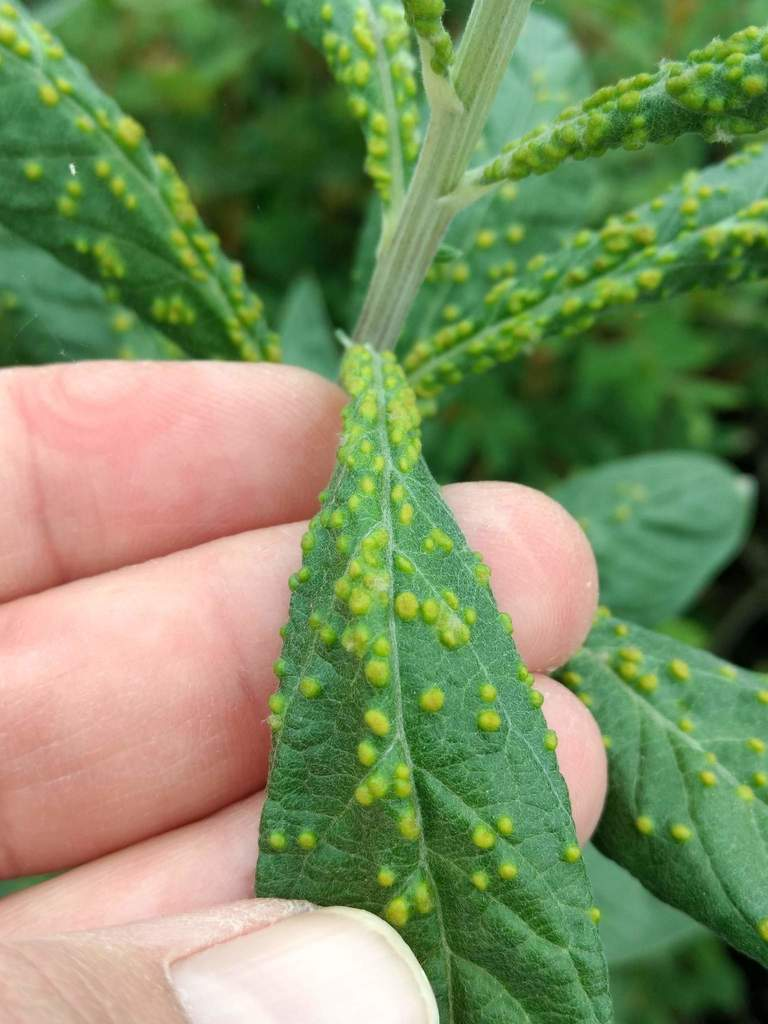
Aceria abalis galls

== Uses ==
Its seeds are foraged by a variety of native birds and its leaves are used as nesting material by some native bees.

Artemisia douglasiana is used by Native American tribes as a medicinal plant to relieve joint pain and headaches, and to treat abrasions and rashes (including poison ivy). It is also used to treat women's reproductive issues, including irregular menstruation and is occasionally used as an abortifacient.

This plant also has ceremonial and spiritual purposes for many tribes. It is commonly carried to ward off spirits of the dead and was smoked or drunk as a tea to induce vivid dreams.

It is also planted by contemporary herbalists for both medicinal and spiritual uses.

=== Cultivation ===
Artemisia douglasiana is cultivated as an ornamental plant by specialty native plant nurseries, for planting in wildlife gardens, natural landscaping design, habitat restoration and erosion control projects.
