= Ssukcha =

Traditional Korean mugwort tea

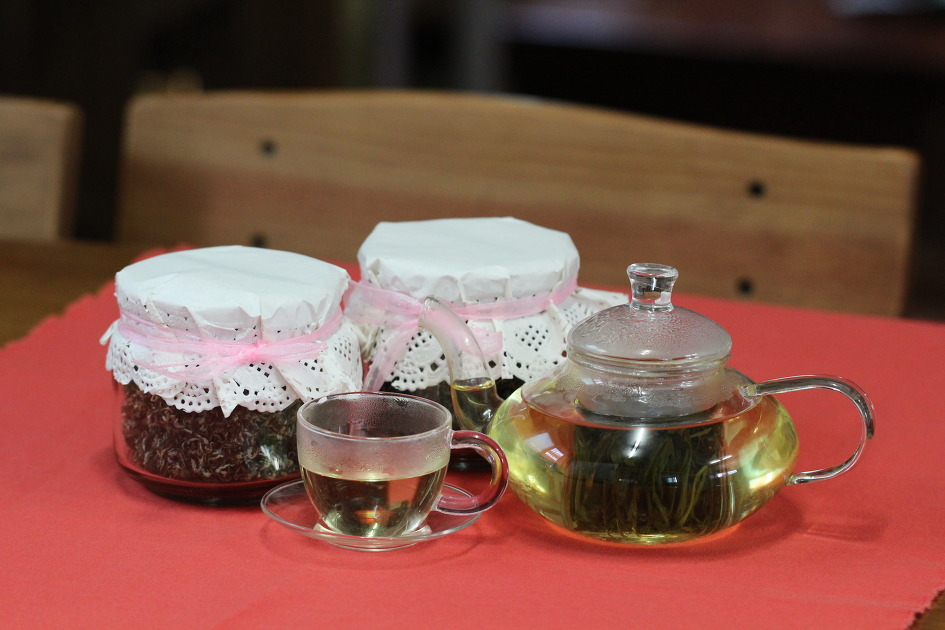
- Type: Herbal tea
- Origin: Korea
- Ingredients: Korean mugwort

Korean name
- Hangul: 쑥차
- Hanja: 쑥茶
- RR: ssukcha
- MR: ssukch'a
- IPA: [s͈uk̚.tɕʰa]

Ssukcha (Korean: 쑥차), also called mugwort tea or wormwood tea, is a traditional Korean tea made from Korean mugwort (called ssuk (쑥) in Korean). It is commonly consumed in both North and South Korea.

== Preparation ==
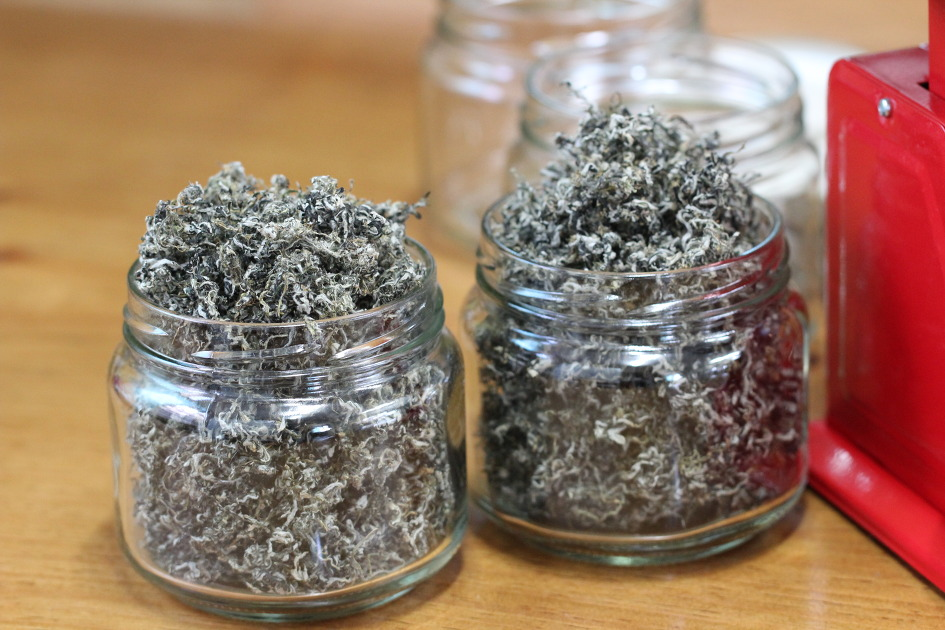
Dried ssukcha

The preparation involves leaves of mugwort harvested around the dano month (5th day of the 5th month; usually around May and June in the Gregorian calendar). The leaves are washed, drained, chopped, and dried in a shaded area for 3‒10 days. Dried mugwort leaves are then roasted in a round-bottomed deokkeum-sot (cauldron for roasting tea). In a teapot, a handful of mugwort and a cup of water is added, and boiled for 5‒10 minutes.

== Medicinal use ==
Korean mugwort is rich in vitamin A, vitamin C, and minerals. In the past, mugwort tea was believed to help prevent and treat the common cold, reducing fever and inflammation, relieving pain, and lowering blood pressure.

== Other uses ==
Ssukcha may serve as a natural herbicide.

== See also ==
- Korean tea
