= Wilibald Swibert Joseph Gottlieb von Besser =

Austrian-born botanist (1784–1842)

- Вилибальд Готлибович Бессер
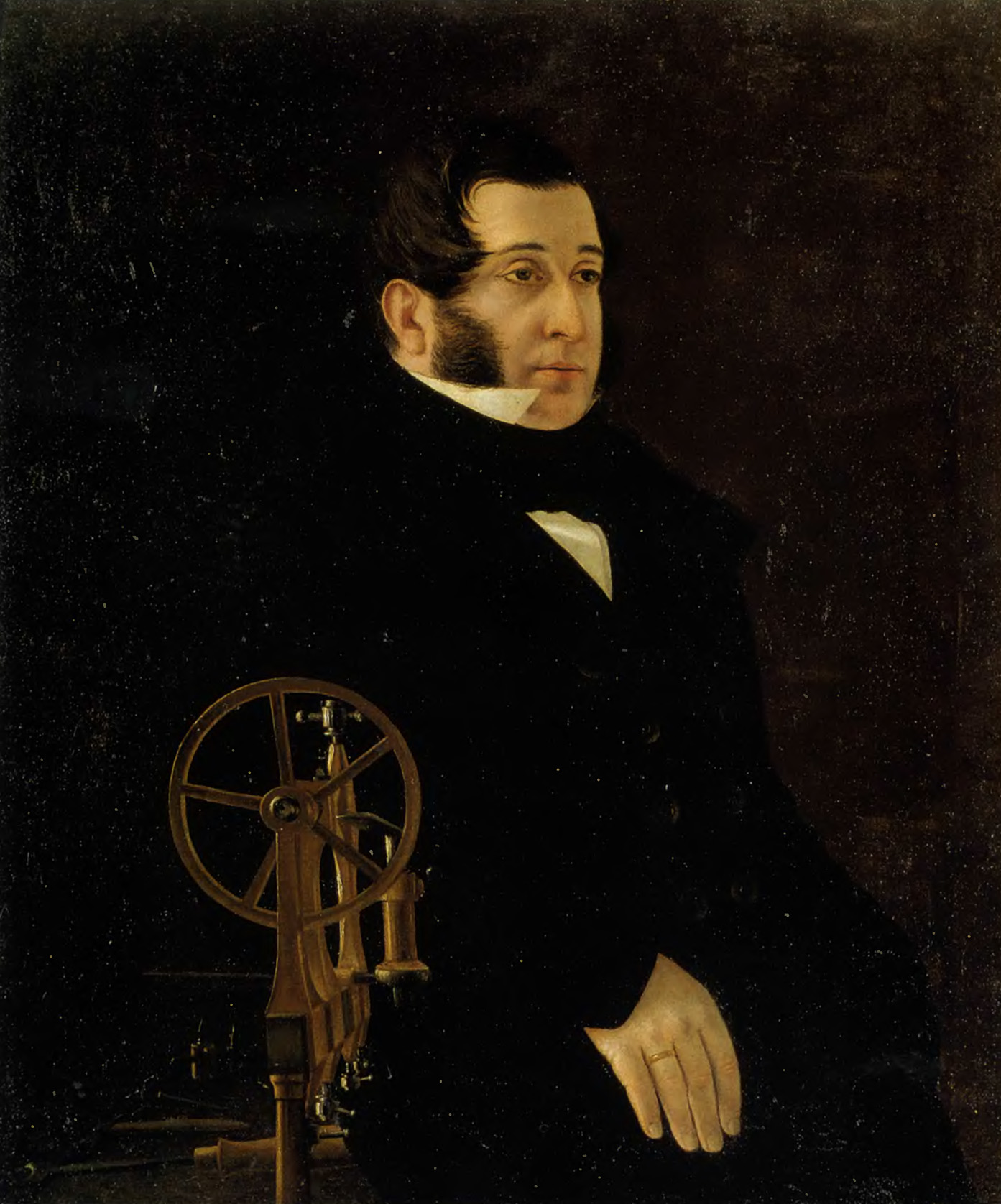
- Portrait by Bonawentura Klembowski, 1830s
- Born: 7 July 1784; Innsbruck, Austria
- Died: 11 October 1842 (aged 58); Kremenets, Russian Empire
- Other name: Vilibald Gotlibovich Besser
- Siglum: W.S.J.G. von Besser
- Education: University of Krakow
- Known for: Classifying more than 650 plant species
- Notable work: Przepisy do układania zielników ("Rules for establishing a herbarium"); Rżut oka na geografję fizyczną Wolynia i Podola ("A glance at the physical geography of Wolyń and Podolia")
- Scientific career
- Fields: Botany
- Workplaces: Krzemieniec Lyceum
- Academic advisors: Josef August Schultes
- Author abbrev. (botany): Besser

Wilibald Swibert Joseph Gottlieb von Besser (7 July 1784 – 11 October 1842), known in Russia as Vilibald Gotlibovich Besser (Russian: Вилибальд Готлибович Бессер), was an Austrian-born botanist active in the Russian Empire's western regions, including modern-day Poland and Ukraine.

== Life ==
Besser was born in Innsbruck. His parents died when he was 13, after which he was raised by his godfather, Swivert Burkhart Schivereck, who was a professor of botany at the University of Lwów. Besser received his initial education at Lwów, then entered university there to study medicine while also practising botany under the guidance of Schivereck, starting a large collection of botanical specimens. Upon the closure of the University of Lwów, von Besser accompanied Schivereck to his new teaching position in Krakow, where the latter died in 1806, leaving his godson with his herbarium. Von Besser graduated as a doctor from the University of Krakow in 1807, and continued to pursue his interest in botany under the direction of Schivereck's successor as chair of botany in Krakow, Josef August Schultes.

Von Besser briefly occupied a position at the local hospital before accepting an offer from Tadeusz Czacki to take up a position teaching at a school in Volhynia in 1808, under condition of becoming a Russian subject and teaching in Polish. The following year he relocated to Kremenets, where he became professor of botany and zoology at the Kremenets gymnasium as well as the director of the botanical garden.

In 1821, he went to Vilnius to confirm his degree of Doctor in Medicine, and the following year von Besser was elected member of the German Academy Leopoldina. For his students at the Kremenets lyceum (the status of lyceum was granted in 1819), as well for local enthusiasts, both of which periodically helped him with his collection. Von Besser prepared a handbook on the keeping of a herbarium, published in Polish in Vilno in 1826 under the title Przepisy do układania zielników ("Rules for establishing a herbarium"). He would publish a second work in Polish in 1828, Rżut oka na geografję fizyczną Wolynia i Podola ("A glance at the physical geography of Wolyń and Podolia"). In 1834 he was appointed professor of botany at the recently established St. Vladimir Imperial University of Kiev, where he taught in Latin due to a lack of fluency in Russian. However, he resigned his position at Kiev three years later, returning to Kremenets, from where he conducted botanical and entomological studies for the remainder of his life. In 1842, Rudolph Friedrich Hohenacker offered an exsiccata with plant specimens collected by Besser under the title Plantae volhynicae et podoloicae, collectae a cl. Prof. Besser.

Besser was a specialist involving botanical species of what was then the western part of the Russian Empire. He was a leading authority of the genus Artemisia.

The genus Bessera was named after him by Julius Hermann Schultes (1804-1840). The species Aconitum besserianum is also named after him.

== Selected writings ==
- Primitiae florae Galiciae Austriacae utriusque (in Latin). sumtibus A. Doll. 1809.
- Enumeratio plantarum hucusque in Volhynia, Podolia, Gub. Kiioviensi, Bessarabia Cis-Tyraica et circa Odessam collectarum, simul cum obervationibus in primitias florae Galiciae austriacae (in Latin). typis Josephi Zawadzki. 1822.
- Ueber die Flora des Baikals, (1834)

== Standard author abbreviation ==
Besser published more than 650 plant species. See: Category:Taxa named by Wilibald Swibert Joseph Gottlieb von Besser and International Plant Name Index

== Sources ==
- "Бессер, Вилибальд Готлибович" . Brockhaus and Efron Encyclopedic Dictionary (in Russian). 1906.
