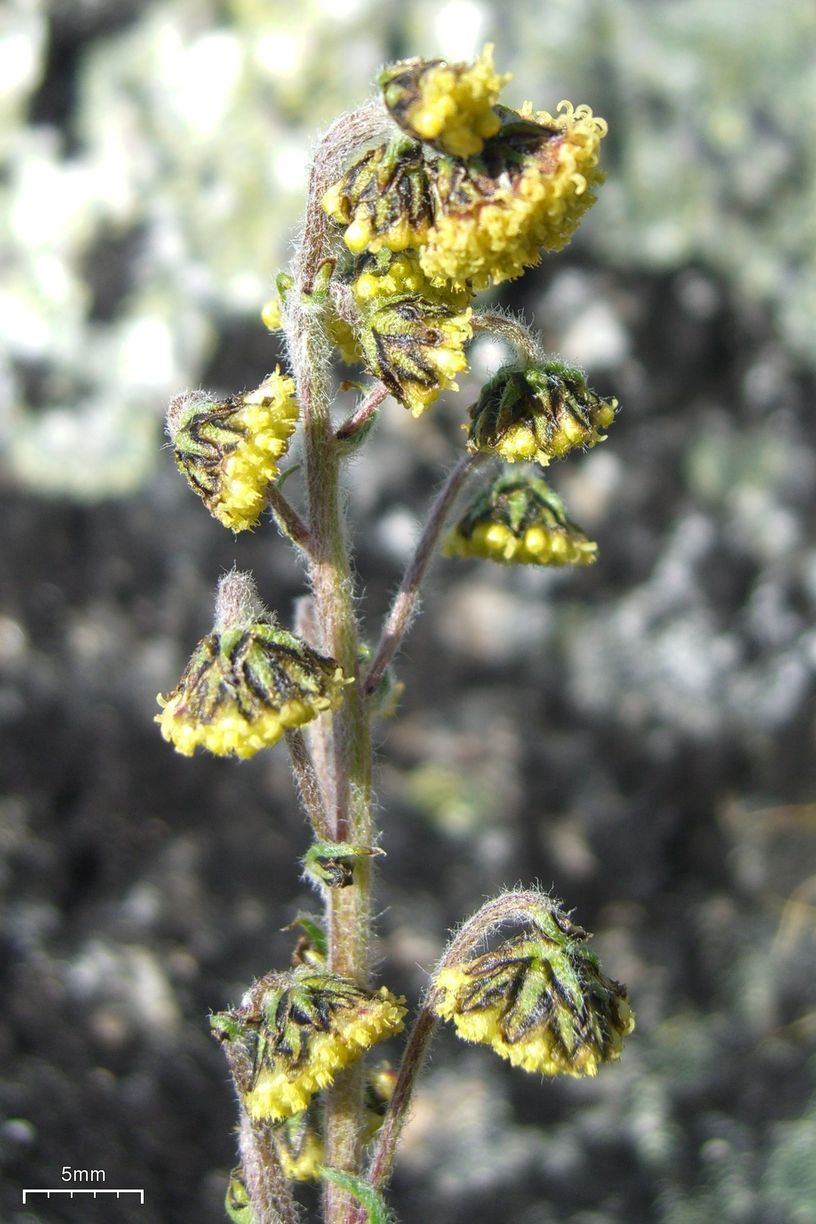

Conservation status
- Secure (NatureServe)

Scientific classification
- Kingdom: Plantae
- Clade: Tracheophytes
- Clade: Angiosperms
- Clade: Eudicots
- Clade: Asterids
- Order: Asterales
- Family: Asteraceae
- Genus: Artemisia
- Species: A. norvegica

Binomial name
- Artemisia norvegica Fries

Synonyms
- Artemisia richardsoniana A.Gray 1862 not Besser 1836; Artemisia rupestris O.F.Müll.; Artemisia arctica Less., syn of subsp. saxatilis; Artemisia comata Rydb., syn of subsp. saxatilis

= Artemisia norvegica =

Species of flowering plant

Artemisia norvegica is a species of flowering plant in the aster family known by the common names alpine sagewort, boreal sagewort, mountain sagewort, Norwegian mugwort, arctic wormwood, and spruce wormwood. It is found in cold locations in Eurasia (Scotland, Scandinavia, Ural Mountains of Russia) and high elevations and high latitudes in North America (Nunavut, Yukon, Alaska, British Columbia, Alberta, Washington, Montana, Idaho, Wyoming, California).

== Description ==
Artemisia norvegica is a perennial subshrub growing 20 to 60 centimetres (7.9 to 23.6 inches) tall with erect stems growing from a caudex and taproot. Most of the leaves are located low on the stems and are 2 to 20 centimetres (0.79 to 7.87 inches) long. The nodding inflorescence bears flower heads containing ray and disc florets. The ray florets are female with no functioning male parts and the disc florets at the center are bisexual. The plant reproduces by seed and may spread vegetatively by sending out stolons. The seeds are dispersed on the wind.

== Distribution and habitat ==
Artemisia norvegica grows in subalpine and alpine climates and in Arctic habitat such as tundra. It can be found in moraines, fell field habitat, alpine meadows, and areas dominated by grasses and sedges. In Alaska it occurs on the fjords of Prince William Sound alongside larkspur monkshood (Aconitum delphiniifolium), Eschscholtz's buttercup (Ranunculus eschscholtzii), and Canadian burnet (Sanguisorba canadensis). It grows on Alaskan mountains such as the Kenai Mountains with grasses, sedges, and willows. In the alpine tundra of the Rocky Mountains it grows in snowbeds and on turf made up of blackroot sedge (Carex elynoides) and alpine clover (Trifolium dasyphyllum). It occurs in the mountains of the Northwest Territories among lichens and grasses such as arctic bluegrass (Poa arctica).

Artemisia norvegica is food for a number of animals, such as mountain goats, which eat it during the summer in Alaska, as well as Sitka black-tailed deer and hoary marmots.

Artemisia norvegica is a pioneer species in the primary phase of ecological succession in disturbed areas, such as plains scoured by flooding. It has been known to colonize denuded soil in vehicle tracks. It was used to revegetate habitat disturbed during the construction of the Trail Ridge Road in Colorado.

=== Subspecies ===
Three subspecies are accepted.

- Artemisia norvegica subsp. norvegica – Norway, northern and eastern European Russia, and western Siberia
- Artemisia norvegica subsp. saxatilis (Besser) H.M.Hall & Clem. – eastern Siberia to Japan, the Aleutian Islands, Alaska, western Canada, and the western United States
- Artemisia norvegica var. scotica Hultén – northwestern Scotland
