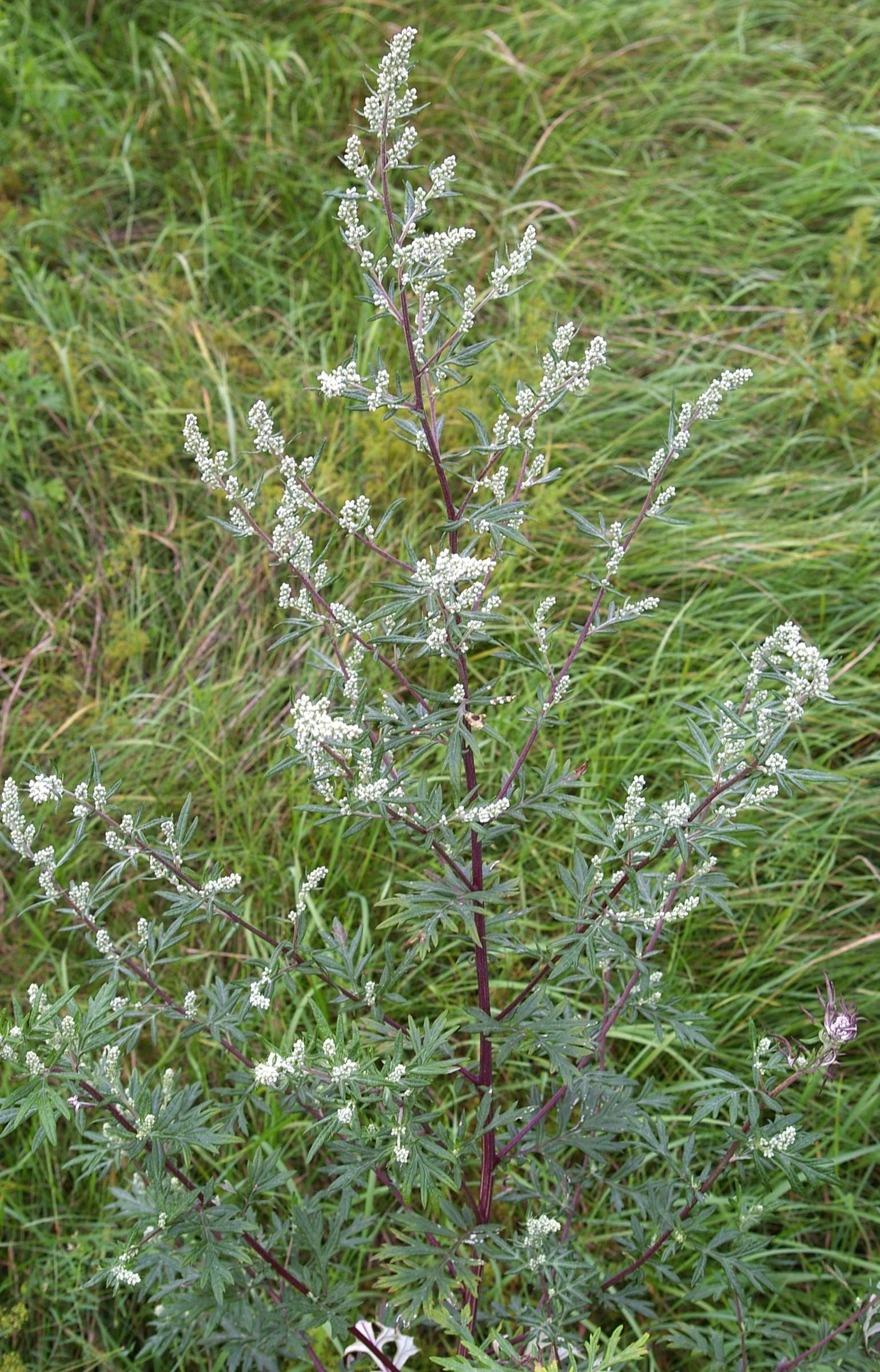

Scientific classification
- Kingdom: Plantae
- Clade: Tracheophytes
- Clade: Angiosperms
- Clade: Eudicots
- Clade: Asterids
- Order: Asterales
- Family: Asteraceae
- Genus: Artemisia
- Species: A. vulgaris

Binomial name
- Artemisia vulgaris L.

Synonyms
- Synonymy: Absinthium vulgare (L.) Dulac; Artemisia affinis Hassk.; Artemisia apetala hort.pest. ex Steud.; Artemisia coarctata Forselles; Artemisia eriophora Schltdl. ex Ledeb.; Artemisia heyneana Wall.; Artemisia ibukijomogi Siebold; Artemisia jaxartica Poljakov; Artemisia officinalis Gaterau; Artemisia opulenta Pamp.; Artemisia paniculaeformis DC.; Artemisia parviflora Wight; Artemisia quadripedalis Gilib.; Artemisia ruderalis Salisb.; Artemisia samamisica Besser; Artemisia superba Pamp; Artemisia violacea Desf.; Artemisia virens Moench; Artemisia vulgaris var. articulatopilosa Peschkova; Artemisia vulgaris subvar. brachystachya DC.; Artemisia vulgaris var. cinerascens Rouy; Artemisia vulgaris subsp. coarctata V.P.Ameljczenko; Artemisia vulgaris var. coarctata (Forselles) Hartm.; Artemisia vulgaris subvar. foliosa (Wallr.) DC.; Artemisia vulgaris var. foliosa Wallr.; Artemisia vulgaris var. glabra Ledeb.; Artemisia vulgaris subsp. litoralis H.M.Hall & Clem.; Artemisia vulgaris var. major Rouy; Artemisia vulgaris var. merkiana Besser; Artemisia vulgaris var. minor Lej.; Artemisia vulgaris var. parvifolia Rouy; Artemisia vulgaris var. rubriflora Turcz. ex Besser; Artemisia vulgaris subvar. sativa (Wallr.) DC.; Artemisia vulgaris var. sativa Wallr.; Artemisia vulgaris subvar. sylvestris (Wallr.) DC.; Artemisia vulgaris var. sylvestris Wallr.; Artemisia vulgaris subsp. typica H.M.Hall & Clem.; Artemisia vulgaris var. typica H.St.John; Artemisia vulgaris subsp. urjanchaica; Artemisia vulgaris var. vestita Brügger ex Corb.

= Artemisia vulgaris =

Medicinal plant known as common mugwort

Artemisia vulgaris, commonly known as mugwort, common mugwort, or wormwood, (Note: The plant is occasionally known as wormwood, sagebrush, felon herb, chrysanthemum weed, wild wormwood, old Uncle Henry, sailor's tobacco, naughty man, or old man. In the Netherlands and Germany it is sometimes called St. John's Plant, as it is supposed to provide protection if gathered on St. John's Eve.) is a species of flowering plant in the daisy family Asteraceae. It is one of several species in the genus Artemisia commonly known as mugwort, although Artemisia vulgaris is the species most often called mugwort. Mugworts have been used medicinally and as culinary herbs.

== Description ==
Artemisia vulgaris is an aromatic, herbaceous, perennial plant that grows to 1.5 m (4 ft 11 in) in height. It spreads through vegetative expansion and the anthropogenic dispersal of root rhizome fragments—the plant rarely reproduces from seeds in temperate regions, as few seeds capable of germinating are produced by plants. Mugwort cannot easily be controlled by being ploughed into the soil, as sections of the plant's rhizomes move away from the parent plant if the soil is disturbed, causing the number of new plants to increase.

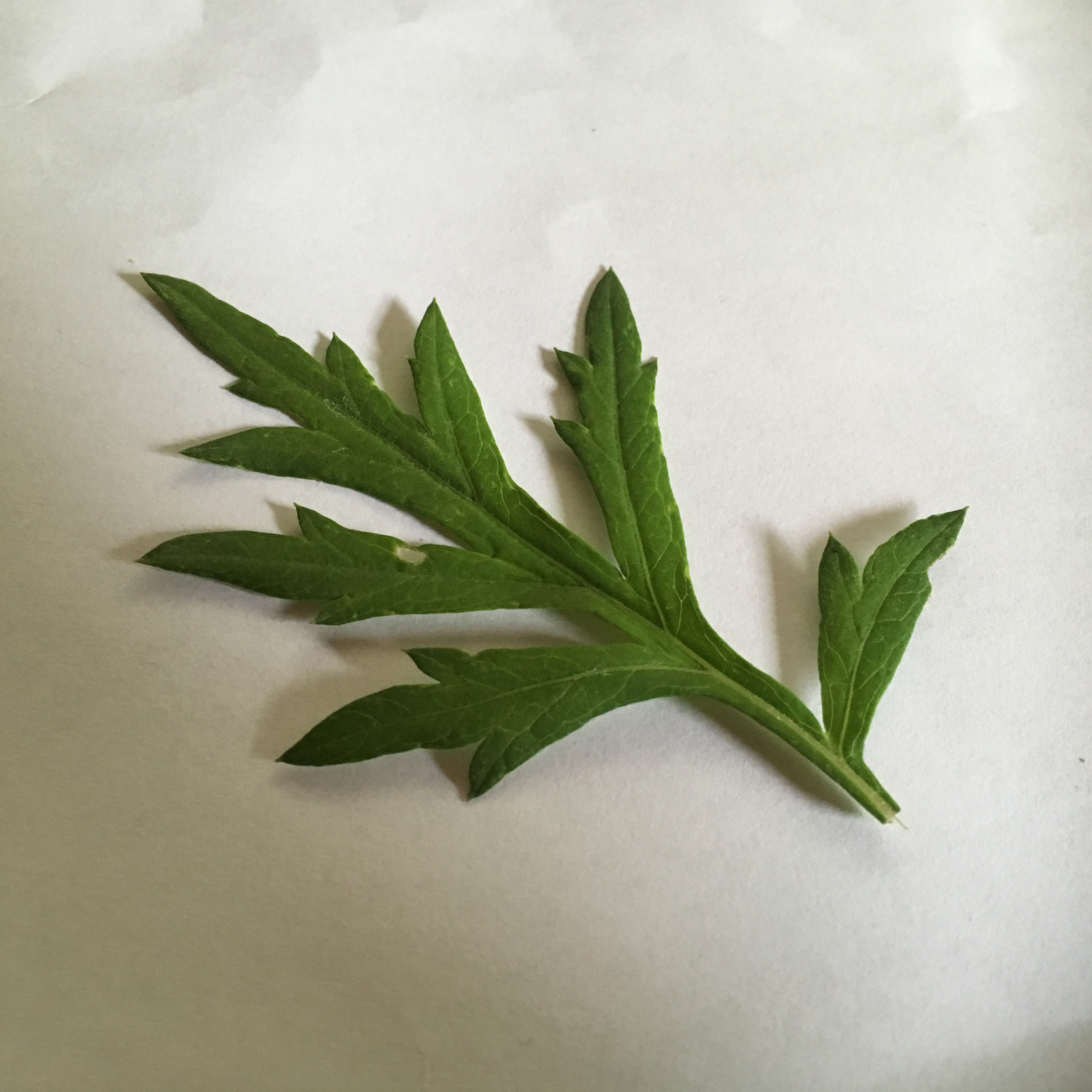
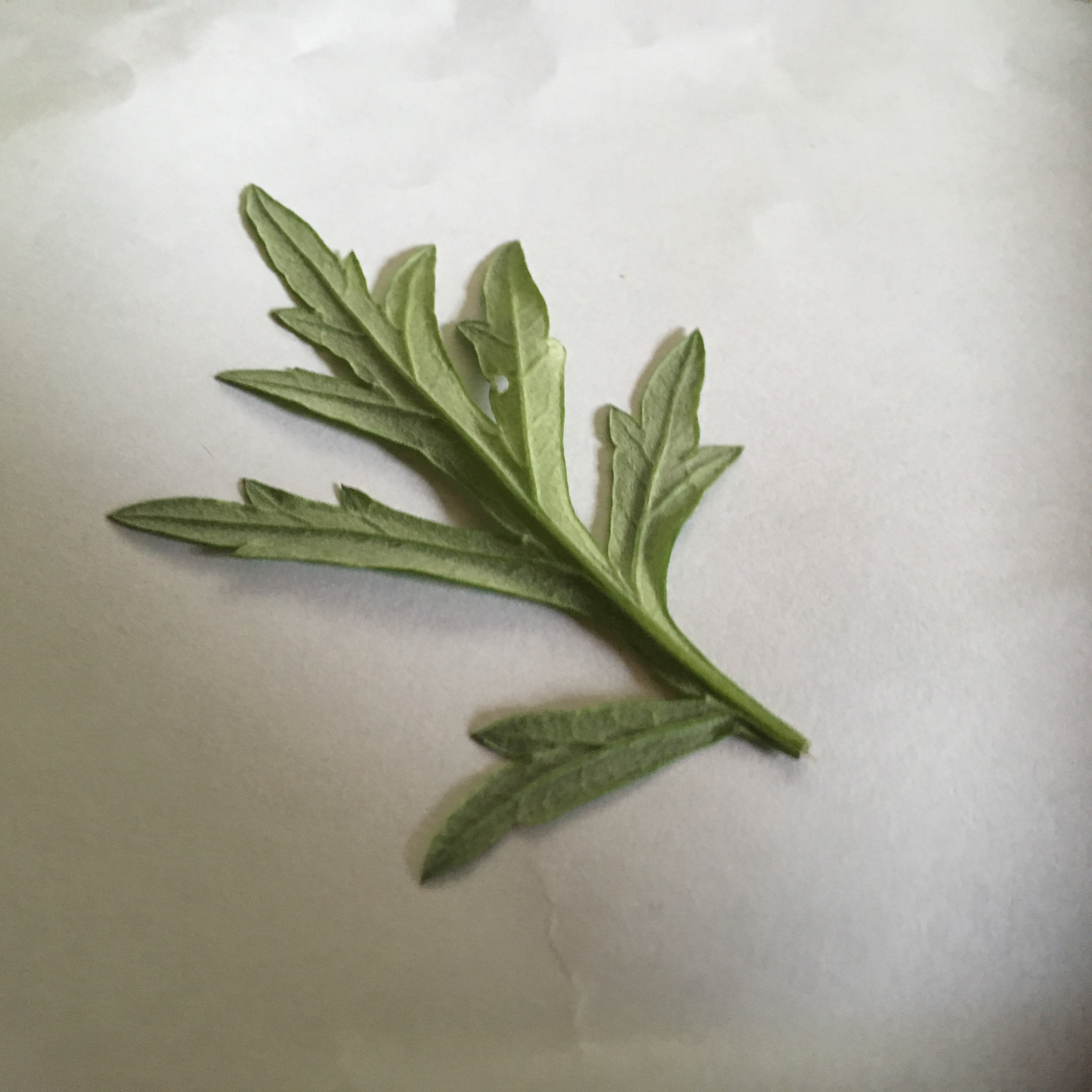
Upper and lower side of leaf

The stems are purple-looking and angular. The pinnate leaves are smooth and of a dark green tint on the upper surface. They have dense, whitish tomentose hairs on the underside, are glabrous on the upperside, and have lobes that are approximately 2.5–8 mm (0.098–0.315 in) wide. New leaves are opposite and are attached to the stem with a thin, long petiole. They are rounded, lack lobes, and are woolly-looking underneath.

The yellow or reddish-looking flower heads, which appear from July to September, are arranged paniculate branching structure. They are 5 mm (3/16 in) long and radially symmetrical. The outer flowers in each capitulum are female and the inner ones bisexual. A. vulgaris flowers from midsummer to early autumn. The brown rectangular-shaped fruit has one seed, and has ridges, a narrow base, and tiny bristles on the end.

The root system consists of numerous horizontal branched rhizomes from which adventitious roots are produced. As many as new 20 stems can grow from one root system. The main brown woody root, which is about 200 mm (7.9 in) long, has rootlets 51–102 mm (2.0–4.0 in) long, and approximately 2 mm (0.079 in) thick.

Margaret Grieve, in her A Modern Herbal (first published in 1931), described the taste as "sweetish and acrid", but contact with the plant or consuming the beverage made from it is thought to cause dermatitis.

=== Name ===
The name mugwort is thought to have come from its use of as a method of giving flavour to beer. According to Grieve, mugwort may have been derived from moughte (a term for a moth or maggot), "because from the days of Dioscorides, the plant has been regarded, in common with Wormwood, as useful in keeping off the attacks of moths".

The Ukrainian name for mugwort, чорнобиль, chornóbyl' (or more commonly полин звичайний polýn zvycháynyy, 'common artemisia') means "black stalk". The Ukrainian city of Chernobyl gets its name from the plant.

== Distribution and habitat ==
Artemisia vulgaris is native to temperate Europe, Asia, North Africa, and Alaska, and is naturalized in North America, where some consider it an invasive weed. It is a common plant growing in places containing low-nitrogen soils, such as waste places, roadsides and uncultivated areas. The plant, which prefers alkaline conditions, readily becomes established in open, sandy ground.

The plant rarely reproduces from seeds in temperate regions, as few seeds capable of germinating are produced by plants, and the species mainly reproduces from rhizomes. Mugwort cannot easily be controlled by being ploughed into the soil, as sections of the plant's rhizomes move away from the parent plant if the soil is disturbed, causing the number of new plants to increase.

== Ecology ==
Several species of Lepidoptera (butterflies and moths) such as Ostrinia scapulalis feed on the leaves and flowers of the plant. It is possibly susceptible to being attacked by honey fungus.

== Uses ==
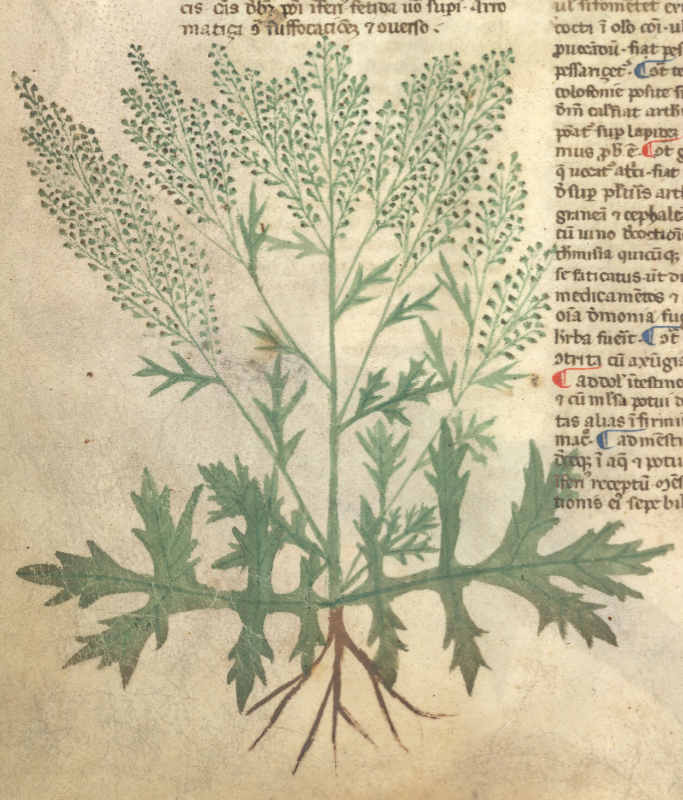
A. vulgaris illustrated in the late 13th (or early 14th-century) herbal Tractatus de Herbis, British Library

=== Ingestion ===
Before the introduction of hops in the beer-making process, A. vulgaris was once commonly used in England as the flavouring agent. Dried mugwort flowers were added to malt liquor, and this was added to the beer. Mugwort has been used as one of the traditional flavouring and bittering agents of gruit ales, a type of unhopped, fermented grain beverage. In Vietnam as well as in Germany, mugwort is used in cooking as an aromatic herb. In China, the crunchy stalks of young shoots of A. vulgaris are a seasonal vegetable often used in stir fries.

The dried leaves can be smoked or used to make a tea, to promote lucid dreaming.

=== Pharmacological uses ===
Historically, A. vulgaris was referred to as the "mother of herbs" during the Middle Ages, and has been widely used in the traditional Chinese, European, and Hindu medicine. It supposedly possesses a wide range of pharmacological uses, including anticancer, anti-inflammatory, antioxidant, hepatoprotective, antispasmolytic, antinociceptive, antibacterial, antihypertensive, antihyperlipidemic, and antifungal properties.

=== Other ===
In the Middle Ages, mugwort was called Cingulum Sancti Johannis, as it was believed that the 1st century preacher John the Baptist wore a girdle made from the plant. According to Grieve, mugwort was believed to protect travellers from exhaustion, heatstroke, and wild animals; it was worn on St. John's Eve to gain security from evil spirits.

In Nepal, the plant is used as an offering to the gods, for cleansing the environment (by sweeping floors or hanging a bundle outside the home), as incense, and also as a medicinal plant.

== Phytochemical constituents ==
A. vulgaris houses a variety of phytochemicals which are responsible for its pharmacological properties. The phytochemicals belong to classes including flavonoids, essential oils, phenolic acids, coumarins, sterols, carotenoids, vitamins, and sesquiterpene lactones, among many others. Examples of the phytochemicals include vulgarin, artemisinin, scopoletin, camphene, camphor, sabinene, and some derivatives of quercetin and kaempferol.

== Sources ==
- Grieve, Margaret (1971) [1931]. "Mugwort". A Modern Herbal. Vol. 2. New York: Hafner. pp. 556–558. OCLC 1405460980.
- Melnychuk, O.S., ed. (2012). Етимологічний словник української мови [Etymological dictionary of the Ukrainian language] (in Ukrainian). Vol. 7. Kyiv: Naukova Dumka.
- Stace, Clive (2019). New Flora of the British Isles (4th ed.). Middlewood Green, Suffolk, UK: C & M Floristics. ISBN 978-1-5272-2630-2.
