= Cold Food Festival =

Traditional East Asian festival

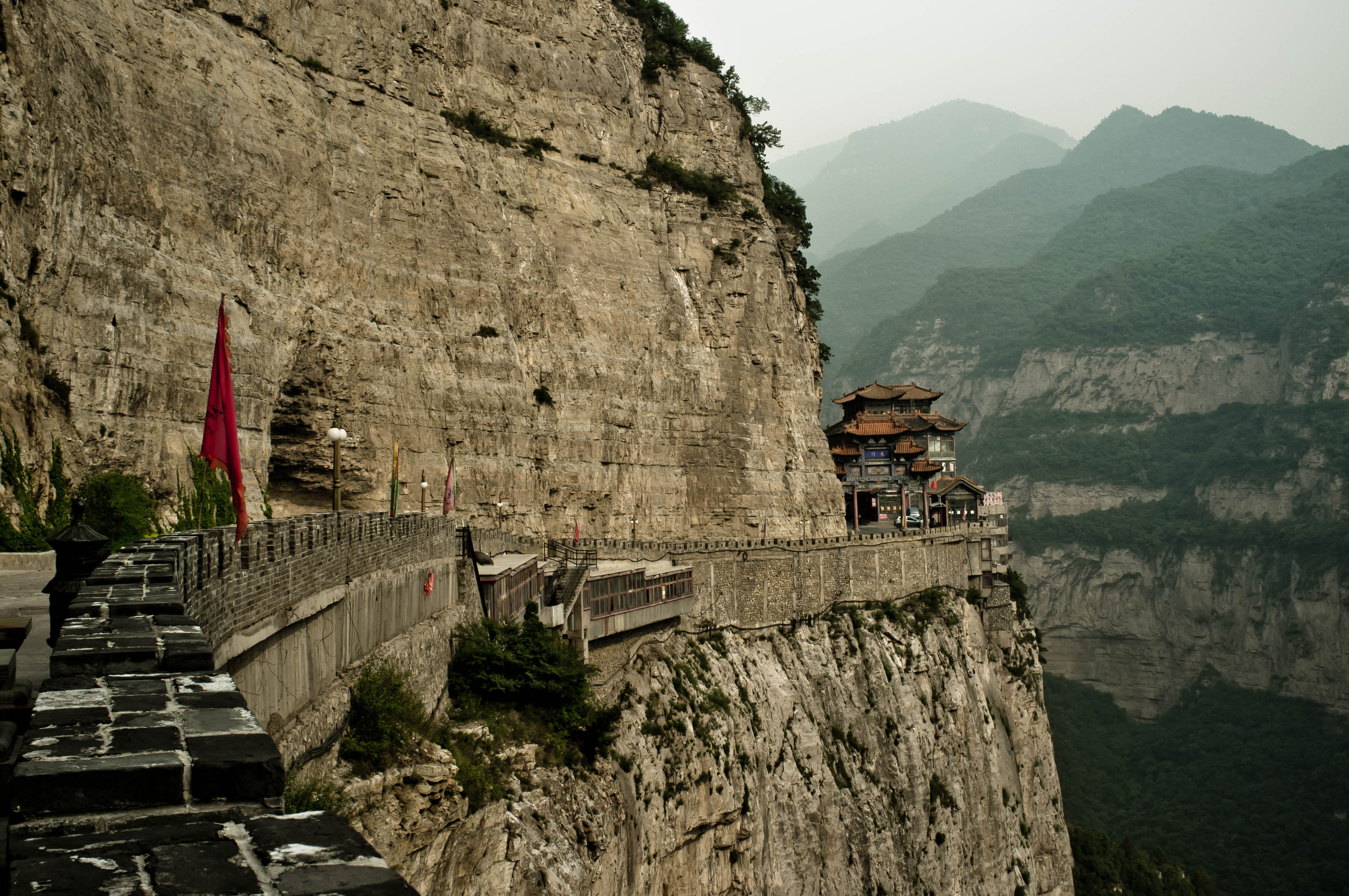
- Mount Mian in Shanxi
- Also called: 寒食节 Hanshi Festival (China); Hansik (South Korea); Tết Hàn Thực (Vietnam); Day of No Fire
- Observed by: Chinese, South Koreans, Vietnamese, Mongolians
- Type: Cultural
- Begins: 105th day after December solstice (April 4 or April 5)
- Ends: 107th day after December solstice (April 6 or April 7)
- Date: 106th day after December solstice (April 5 or April 6)
- Duration: 3 days
- Frequency: Annual
- Related to: Tomb Sweeping Festival

Cold Food Festival

Chinese name
- Traditional Chinese: 寒食節
- Simplified Chinese: 寒食节
- Literal meaning: "Cold Food Festival"
Transcriptions
Standard Mandarin
- Hanyu Pinyin: Hánshí jié
- IPA: [xǎn.ʂɻ̩̌ tɕjě]
Yue: Cantonese
- Yale Romanization: Hòhnsihk jit
- Jyutping: Hon^{4}sik^{6} zit^{3}
- IPA: [hɔn˩.sɪk̚˨ tsit̚˧]
Southern Min
- Hokkien POJ: Hân si̍t cheh

Vietnamese name
- Vietnamese alphabet: Tết Hàn Thực
- Chữ Hán: 節寒食

Korean name
- Hangul: 한식
- Hanja: 寒食
Transcriptions
- Revised Romanization: Hansik
- McCune–Reischauer: Hansik

Mongolian name
- Mongolian Cyrillic: Ханш нээх
- Mongolian script: ᠬᠠᠩᠰᠢ ᠨᠡᠭᠡᠭᠡᠬᠦ
Transcriptions
- SASM/GNC: hansh neeh

The Cold Food or Hanshi Festival (寒食节) is a traditional Chinese holiday which developed from the local commemoration of the death of the Jin nobleman Jie Zitui in the 7th century BC under the Zhou dynasty, into an occasion across East Asia for the commemoration and veneration of ancestors by the 7th-century Tang dynasty. Its name derives from the tradition of avoiding the lighting of any kind of fire, even for the preparation of food. This practice originally occurred at midwinter for as long as a month, but the hardship this involved led to repeated attempts to ban its observance out of concern for its practitioners. By the end of the Three Kingdoms period (3rd century), it was limited to three days in the spring around the Qingming solar term. Under the Tang, ancestral observance was limited to the single day which is now the Tomb-Sweeping Festival. The Tomb-Sweeping Festival is an official holiday in several countries, and the Cold Food Festival which stretches either side of it continues to see some observance in China, South Korea, and Vietnam.

== Legend ==
The usual story for the origin of the Cold Food and Tomb-Sweeping Festivals concerns the 7th-century-BC Jin nobleman Jie Zhitui, a model of self-sacrificing loyalty.

During the Spring and Autumn period of Chinese history, the Zhou Kingdom began to break up into its constituent parts and their lords gained more and more freedom from central control. One of these states was Jin, around modern Shanxi. As was common among wealthy Chinese at the time, its duke had many wives. One of them, Li Ji, was of lower status and came from the Rong tribes who lived to China's west, but successfully schemed to become a full wife and to establish her son as the duke's successor. Her older stepson Ji Chong'er was framed for revolting against the duke in 655 BC, forcing the prince to flee for his life to his mother's family among the Di tribes north of China. Only 15 of his men followed him into exile. These included Jie Zhitui, who entertained the prince with his poems and music. He was so considerate of his lord that once, when their supplies were stolen while traveling through Wey, he used meat from his own thigh to make soup to relieve the prince's hunger.

In 636 BC, the duke of Qin finally invaded Jin on Chong'er's behalf and installed him as its duke. (Posthumously, he became known as the "Wen" or "Civilized Duke" of Jin.) In 635 BC, the new duke was generous to those who had helped him in adversity but overlooked Jie, who became obscure in the forests near Mt Mian. The duke sent repeated envoys to lure Jie back to court, but he felt no ambition for political power. Too loyal to directly criticize his master but too principled to accept a place in a corrupt administration, he opted to simply remain in seclusion. Annoyed, the duke ordered a forest fire to be started around three sides of the mountain to smoke Jie and his mother out of hiding. Instead of coming out, they were burnt alive. Jie's charred corpse was found still standing, embracing or tightly bound to a tree. In his remorse, the duke inaugurated the Cold Food Festival as a memorial period for Jie.

== History ==
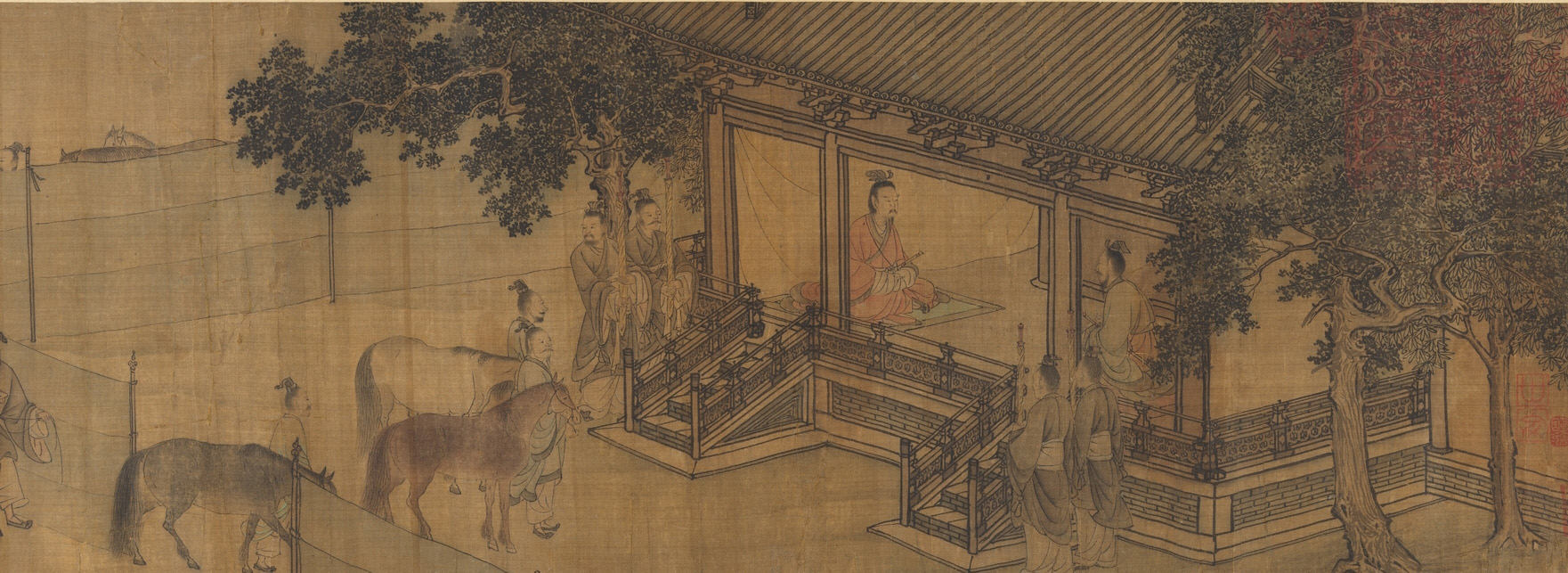
Li Tang's The Civilized Duke of Jin Recovering His State (1140)

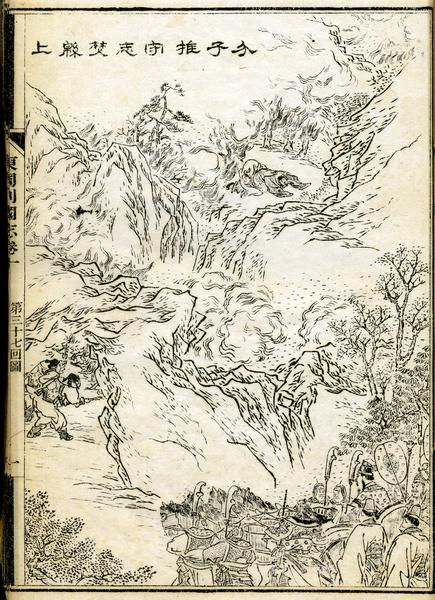
Duke Wen of Jin lit a forest fire on one side of Mt Mian to drive out Jie Zhitui (illustration from the Chronicles of the Eastern Zhou Kingdoms).

The first part of this legend appears to be historical. In the earliest accounts, however, Jie is more prideful than sad and is not killed in a fire. The 4th-century-BC commentary on Confucius's Spring and Autumn Annals traditionally credited to Zuo Qiuming includes a Thucydidean passage where Jie argues with his mother about their future. Jie credits Heaven with having restored Chong'er to his rightful place and is disgusted by the credit-seeking and job-hunting behavior of his fellows, whom he considers worse than thieves. He also finds his lord unworthy for failing to reward him despite his failure to present himself at court. His mother asks him to at least go before the duke, but Jie admits his bitter criticism of the other lords makes that impossibly embarrassing. His mother accepts his decision to withdraw to a hermitage and goes with him. Ji Chong'er belatedly remembers his obligations to Jie and looks for him. When this proves vain, he accepts the situation and sets aside the produce of the fields of "Mëenshang" to endow sacrifices in Jie's honor, "a memento... of my neglect and a mark of distinction for the good man". Other sources from the Zhou and early Han mention and praise Jie for various reasons. The poems of the Songs of Chu extol him for his loyalty and proper treatment of his lord's forgetfulness. Master Lü's Spring and Autumn Annals praises his altruism and lack of personal ambition. At some point before the composition of the Han-era Biographies of the Immortals, Jie came to be revered as a Taoist immortal.

The Cold Food Festival is first mentioned in Huan Tan's New Discussions, composed around the beginning of the 1st century. It records that the commoners of Taiyuan Commandery avoided using fire in preparing their food for five days around midwinter, upholding this taboo even when they are gravely ill. This was done in Jie Zhitui's honor. A biography in the Book of the Later Han relates how the magistrate for Bingzhou (i.e., Taiyuan) found people rich and poor observing a "dragon taboo" against lighting a fire during the month of Jie's death in midwinter, lest they anger his spirit. Many of the old and young died every year because of the hardship this brought. The magistrate Zhou Ju (周舉) wrote an oration around AD 130 praising Jie but admonishing the people for a tradition that harmed so many that it could not have been what the sage intended. He then had the oration displayed at Jie's temple and distributed among the poor. This did not end the Cold Food Festival, but the biography notes that local superstitions did improve "to a certain extent". The improvement is not explained but, at some point over the next century, it moved from the middle of winter to late spring, 105 days after the dongzhi solar term. (Note: A handful of 2nd and 4th century sources also report it being celebrated in the summer, on the 5th day of the 5th lunar month. That date is now used for the Dragon Boat Festival related to similar stories about the ministers Qu Yuan and Wu Zixu.) Since it also spread from Taiyuan to the surrounding commanderies of Shangdang, Xihe, and Yanmen and was still causing some hardship, Cao Cao attempted to outlaw the Cold Food Festival in AD 206. The heads of offending families were liable for 6 months' hard labor, their local official was liable for one month himself, and their magistrate was to lose one month's salary. Cao Cao's effort was a failure, with observance of the Cold Food Festival on Qingming and for up to a month around it being reported by the mid-3rd century. Shi Le, the Jie emperor of the Later Zhao in the early 4th century, again tried to forbid it. The next year a massive hailstorm devastated crops and forests throughout Shanxi. On the advice of his ministers, he again approved the festival in the region around Taiyuan. The Northern Wei similarly banned the festival in 478 and 496, but were also compelled to approve its observance around Mt Mian. These prohibitions failed to such an extent that, by the time of Jia Sixie's c. 540 Qimin Yaoshu, a day-long Cold Food Festival had spread across most of China, moved to the day before the Qingming solar term.

The Cold Food Festival grew to a three-day period and began to incorporate ancestral veneration under the Tang and remained more important than celebrations of the Qingming solar term as late as the Song. The present Tomb-Sweeping Festival on Qingming grew by incorporating the Cold Food observances along with the separate holiday of Shangsi. The Cold Food Festival had almost completely disappeared by the end of the Qing.

=== Controversy ===
Since the early 7th century, Chinese and Western scholars have argued for alternative origins for the festival. Du Gongzhan, the editor of the late-Sui Record of the Seasons of Jingchu, connected it with a ritual avoidance of fire mentioned in the Rites of Zhou: "In mid-spring, they announce the prohibition of fire in the capital using a bell with a wooden clapper". This prohibition was related to the ancient Chinese use of different kinds of firewood according to the seasons, particularly after the development of Chinese astrology that considered the heliacal rising of Antares to be an occasion for great risk of conflagration and wildfire. Du was followed in his conjecture by others, including Li Fu. The Sinologist J.J.M. de Groot argued for its origin as a celebration of the sun's "victory" at the vernal equinox, based on a comparative anthropological analysis drawing on Ovid, Macrobius, Lucian, and Epiphanius of Salamis. James Frazer and his followers similarly considered it either a "sun-charm" or "purification" from its similarities to other "fire-festivals". Claude Lévi-Strauss based his analysis of the festival as a kind of Chinese Lent upon a mistranslation of the relevant passage in the Rites of Zhou by Frazer. Eberhard connected it with his idea of a prehistoric spring-based calendar and made the Cold Food Festival a remnant of its original New Year.

The unanimous connection of the festival to Jie Zhitui in the early sources and the dependence of these later theories on the Cold Food Festival's occurrence in late spring—when it in fact began as a mid-winter observance—suggests that none of them are likely accurate. One contemporary record of ritual fire-avoidance coming from a separate source in southeastern China concerned the late-2nd-century BC "kings" of "Yue" Mi (越糜王, Yuè Míwáng) and Yao (越王遙, Yuè Wáng Yáo, and 越繇王, Yuè Yáowáng). These were actually princes of the old Yue royal family fighting over the southern successor state of Minyue. Supposedly, the Mi King was beheaded during a battle with Yao but his body continued to stay atop his horse all the way back to "Wu Village", where he was buried. As late as the 10th century, residents of the area avoided fire on the day of his death as a mark of respect to his spirit. This southern equivalent to the Cold Food Festival was not celebrated annually, though, but on every "wu day" of the old Chinese calendar, a generally unlucky day to some Taoists.

== Observance ==
=== China ===
The Cold Food Festival was originally observed at mid-winter (the Dongzhi solar term), but moved to late spring (Note: According to the usual Chinese reckoning of the seasons.) (the Qingming solar term) around the 2nd century. Its primary activity was a strict taboo against using fire, usually under the superstitious belief that violations led to violent weather. Leading up to the 6th century, there was a patch of blackened trees on Mt Mian that were used for local worship of Jie Zhitui and had a reputation for miracles. Traditional cold foods included lǐlào (醴酪), a kind of congee flavored with apricot pits and malt sugar. Later activities included visiting ancestral tombs, cock fighting, playing on swings, beating blankets, and tug-of-war games.

The Cold Food Festival is generally ignored in modern China, except to the extent that it has influenced some of the activities and traditional foods for the Tomb-Sweeping Festival. In the city of Jiexiu in Shanxi Province, near where Jie died, locals still commemorate the festival, but even there the tradition of eating cold food is no longer practiced.

=== South Korea ===
The Korean equivalent Hansik (Korean: 한식), takes place on the 105th day after dongzhi, which translates to April 5 in the Gregorian calendar, except in leap years when it is on April 4 instead. It is a day to welcome the warm weather thawing the frozen lands. On this day, rites to worship ancestors are observed early in the morning, and the family visits their ancestors' tombs to tidy up. The custom of eating cold food on the day has, however, disappeared. Since this day coincides with Arbor Day, public cemeteries are crowded with visitors planting trees around the tombs of their ancestors.

=== Vietnam ===
The Vietnamese equivalent Tết Hàn Thực is celebrated in most parts of the country on the 3rd day of the 3rd lunar month, but only marginally. People cook glutinous rice balls called bánh trôi but the holiday's origins are largely forgotten, and the fire taboo is also largely ignored.

== See also ==
- Tết Hàn Thực
- List of festivals in Asia
- Traditional and Public holidays in China, Hong Kong, and Macao and on Taiwan
- Festivals and Public holidays in South Korea and North Korea
- List of Korean traditional festivals
