= Mount Mian =

Mountain in Shanxi, China

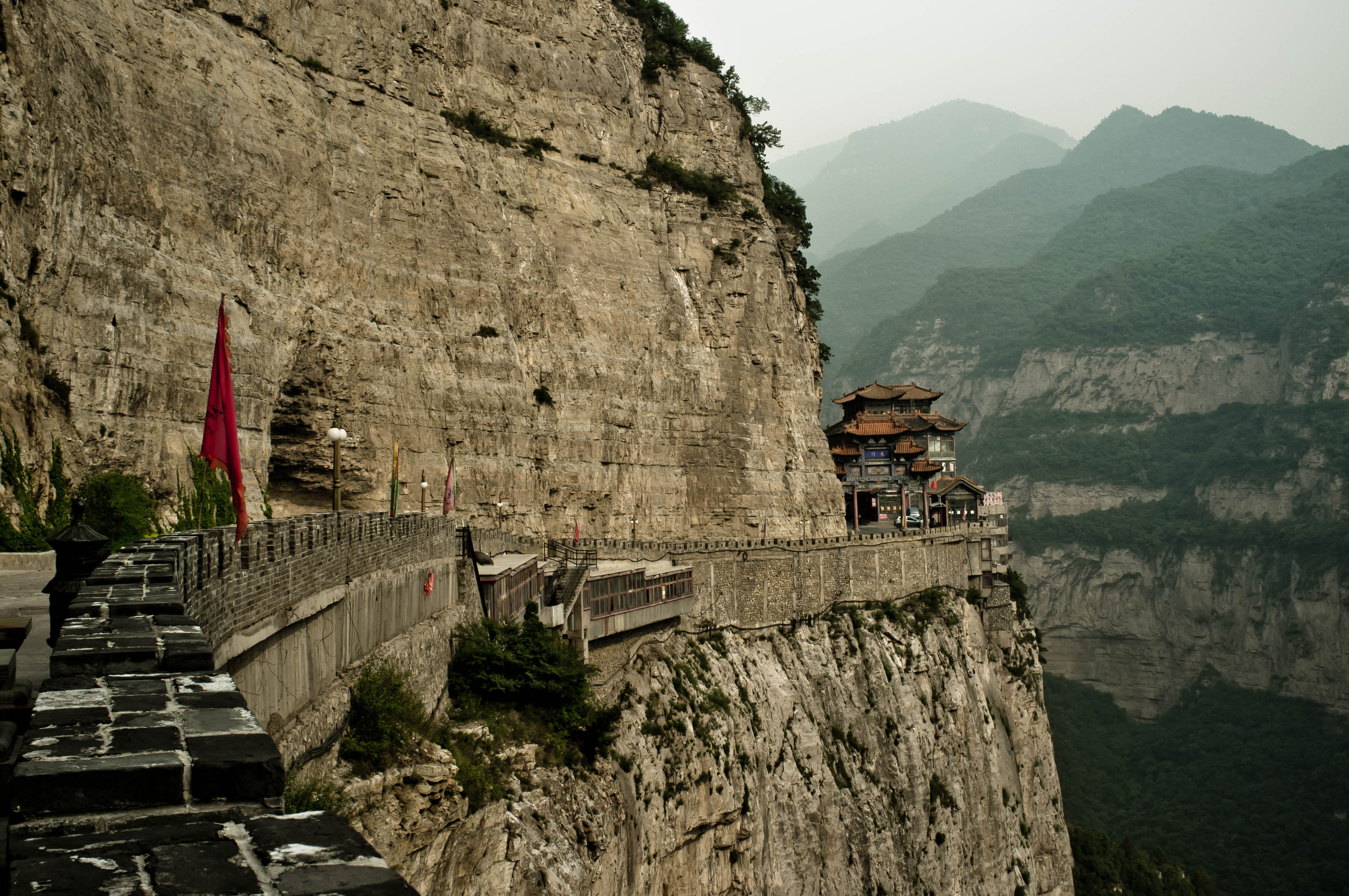
- Traditional Chinese: 綿山
- Simplified Chinese: 绵山
- Literal meaning: Cotton(y) Mountain; Downy Mountain
Transcriptions
Standard Mandarin
- Hanyu Pinyin: Miánshān
- Wade–Giles: Mien Shan

Former names
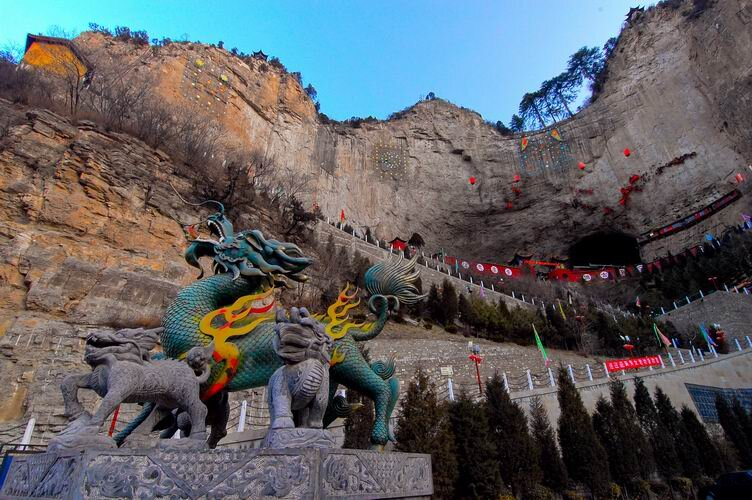
- Statues of qilins
- Chinese: 介山
Transcriptions

Mount Jie
- Literal meaning: Jie's Mountain
Transcriptions
Standard Mandarin
- Hanyu Pinyin: Jièshān
- Wade–Giles: Chieh Shan

Mount Mian, also known by its Chinese name Mianshan, is a mountain in the town of Mianshan in Jiexiu, Jinzhong, in central Shanxi Province in North China. Its official scenic area opened in the year 2000 and covers 75 km^{2} (29 sq mi), with about 400 attractions grouped into 14 tourist areas.

== Name ==
Mount Mian is supposedly named for the resemblance of its long, unbroken ridgeline to a piece of cotton. In ancient Chinese, however, mián did not refer to cotton but to silk floss. It was then used by extension for the ideas of "weak", "soft", and "downy", before coming to be used in modern Chinese as the usual word for cotton.

== Geography ==
Mount Mian is a branch of the Taihang Mountains south of the Fen River. Its official scenic area covers 75 km^{2} (29 sq mi), with about 400 attractions grouped into 14 tourist areas. The chain's ridgeline stretches for over 160 km (100 mi), with its highest peak reaching 2,440 meters (8,010 ft).

The vegetation in the area has been a focus of study at Shanxi University. Geographical features of note include Buddha Embrace Rock, Tiesuo Ridge, Yinkong Cavity, and the Mosta Dome.

== History ==
Mount Mian is usually credited (Note: Most ancient records seem to support the identification of Jiexiu's Mount Mian as the one mentioned in Jie's story, although the Records of Yicheng County compiled during the Qianlong Era of the Qing favored the idea that "Mianshan" and "Jieshan" had been earlier names of the Gushan in Yuncheng Prefecture's Wanrong County.) as the place of the retreat where Jie Zhitui and his mother were burnt alive in a forest fire begun by his lord, Duke Wen of the state of Jin, in the 7th century BC. Duke Wen's remorse prompted him to erect a temple in Jie's honor, with sacrifices funded by designated lands in nearby Mianshang. By the middle of the Han dynasty, people around Taiyuan Commandery were treating Jie as a tutelary deity and observing a taboo against lighting fires for five days around mid-winter. By the mid-2nd century AD, it was being observed for an entire month and causing hardship on the young and elderly to the point that Cao Cao and other leaders began attempting to ban Jie's Cold Food Festival altogether, despite its having moved by that point to Qingming in early spring. Commoners continued to ignore these provisions and to particularly revere a stand of blackened trees, one looking as though it were held in a man's arms, where various miracles were reported. A compromise under the Northern Wei was to restrict it to the area surrounding Mount Mian in 496 but its popularity was such that it continued to spread until it was observed by most of China under the Sui and transformed into the Tomb Sweeping Festival under the Tang and Song.

Mount Mian has been an important Taoist site since the Spring and Autumn period (8th–5th centuries BC) of the Zhou. The first Buddhist temple was erected on the mountain under the Northern Wei and, by the early Tang, it had become large and powerful. During the collapse of the Sui and rise of the Tang, Li Shimin (later "Emperor Taizong") defeated Song Jingang in the Queshu Valley below Mount Mian, prompting the surrender of Yuchi Gong. During the Southern Song, Li Wugong and Li Shi fought Jin soldiers nearby. Under the Mongolian Yuan, Yunfeng and other temples on the mountain were repaired. At the end of the Ming, the military governor at Taiyuan retreated to Mount Mian to lead his ultimately unsuccessful defense of the area.

During World War II, Zhang Dehan and Li Zhimin led Communist guerrillas against Japanese and Nationalists in the area. The Japanese retaliated, damaging or destroying most of the temples in 1940.

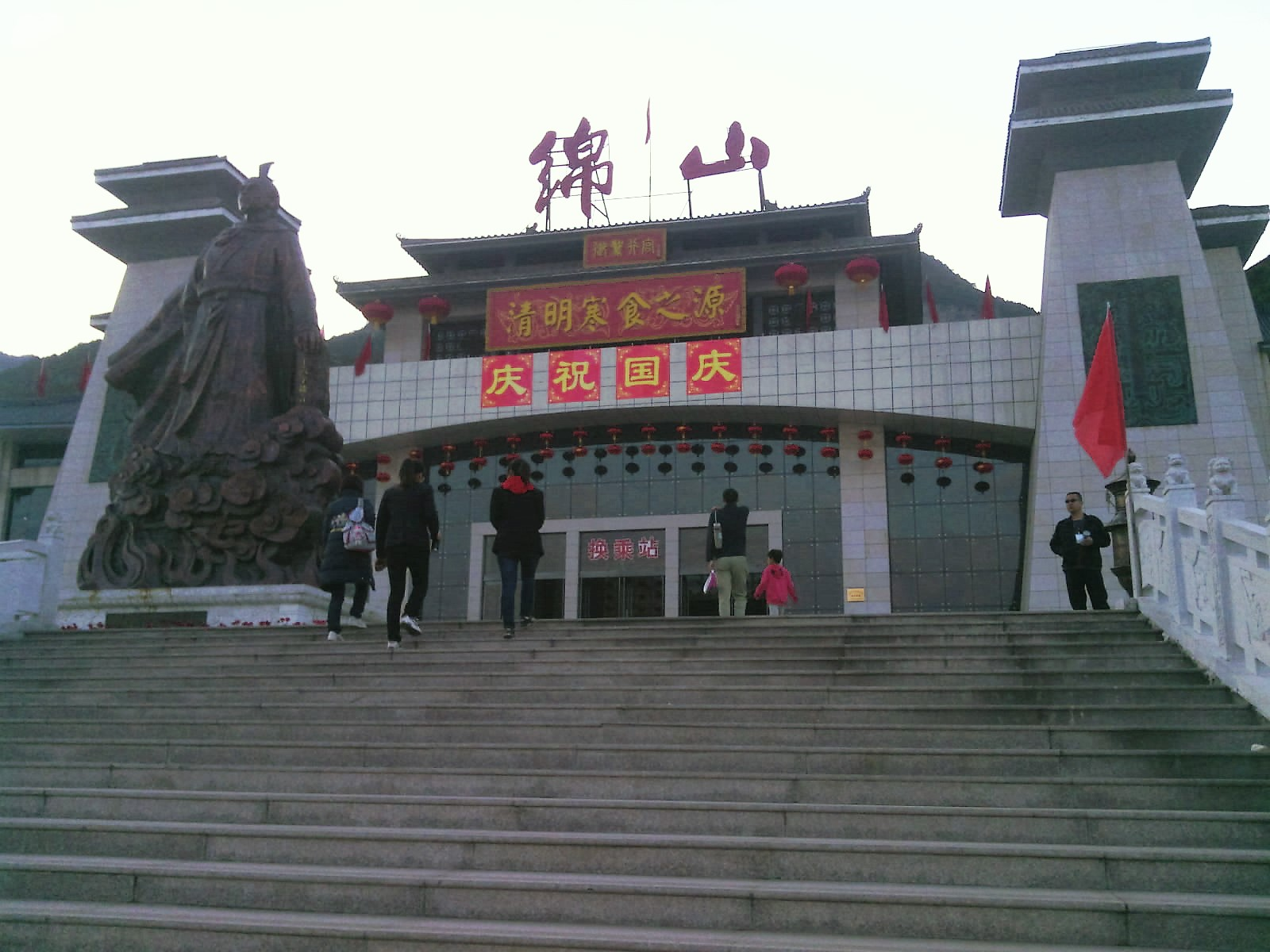
Entrance to the Mount Mian Scenic Area

The mountain has been used as a summer resort since imperial times. Since 1995, Yan Jiying, chairman of the Sanjia Coal and Chemical Company, has spent 600m RMB repairing the mountain and its temples. It was opened as a public scenic area in 2000. It remains among the most important Taoist sites in modern China. The second major Taoist rite to occur in mainland China after the Communist victory in the Chinese Civil War—a Great Offering to the Entire Firmament (t 羅天大醮, s 罗天大醮, Luótiān Dàjiào)—occurred at Mount Mian in 2001. Mount Mian was also one of the most important sites for the celebrations surrounding the anniversary of Lao-tze's birth in March 2003. The China National Tourism Administration named Mount Mian a AAAAA-rated tourist attraction in 2013. A study by researchers from Shanxi University the same year, however, found that the routes through the scenic area remained insufficiently interconnected with one another and should be further optimized to increase the resort's capacity.

== Areas ==
=== Dragon Head Temple ===
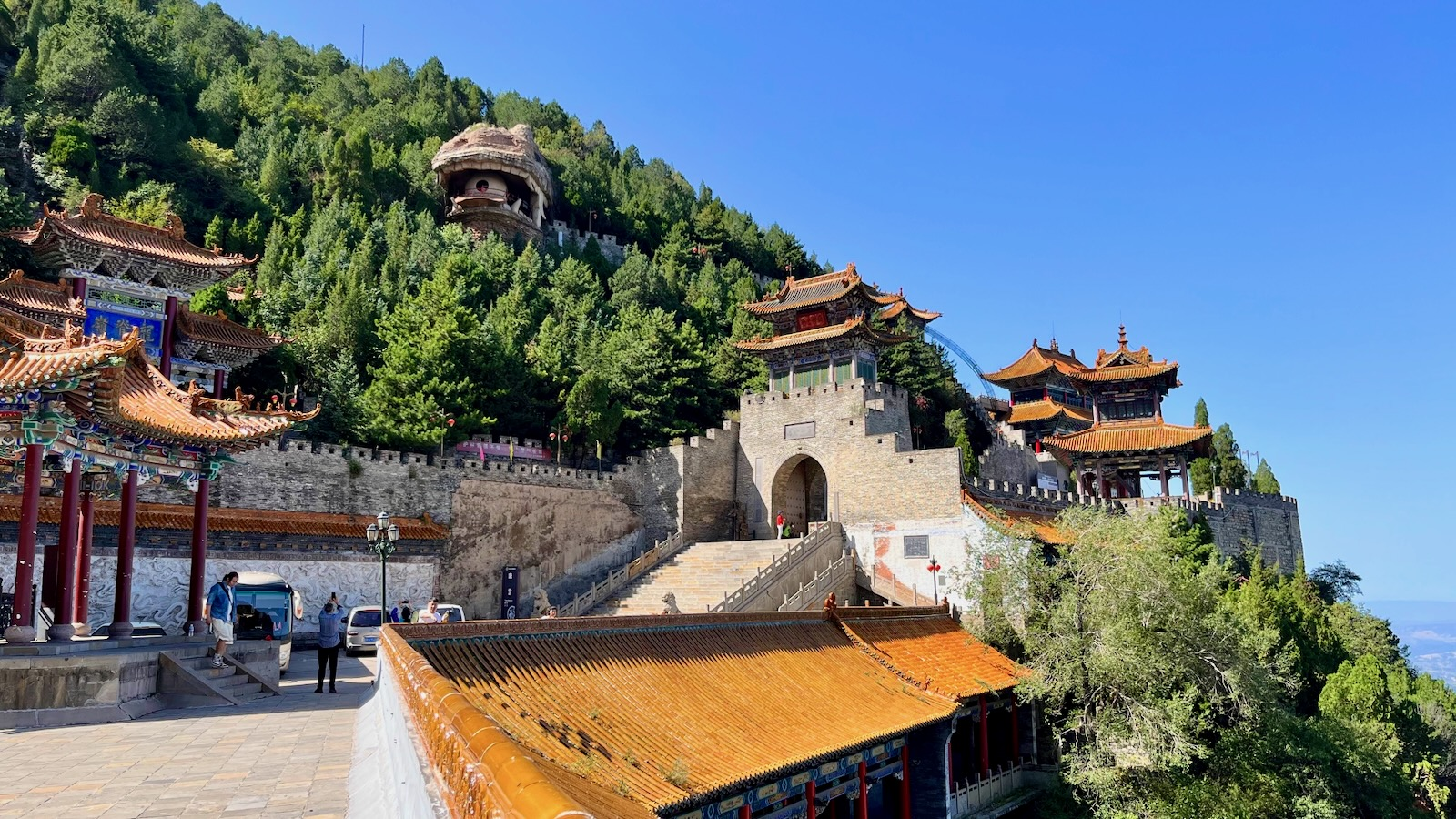
Mianshan Dragon Head Temple with dragon head coming out of the trees with a crystal ball in its mountain.

This area includes over 20 sites, including the Dragon Head Temple and the Longmen Stone Arches. The Dragon Head Temple supposedly takes its name from a pair of dragons who appeared to Li Shimin ("Emperor Taizong" of the Tang) during a visit to the mountain.

=== Dragon Ridge Peak ===
The Dragon Ridge Peak area includes a statue of Jie Zhitui with his mother, a Tang barracks, and a park with stone inscriptions about public health. The ridge is named for its appearance, thought to resemble two intersecting dragons.

=== Five Dragons' Traces ===
The Traces of the Five Dragons or Wulongchan are five gullies supposedly formed by the bodies of five dragons who visited Mount Mian to listen to a sermon by the Tang buddha Tian Zhichao. The Zhengguo Temple has 3 halls preserving the well-preserved remains of 12 other monks of the Tang, Song, and Yuan dynasties. Other sites in the valleys are the Shangfang Academy, the Five-Dragon Pine, the Lingyin Terrace, and the Tongtian Yunqu ("Cloud Thoroughfare Leading to Heaven").

=== Guteng Valley ===
The Guteng or Ancient Vine Valley, also known as the Stream Gully, includes the path leading to the top of Mount Mian. It has abundant wildlife including pheasants and squirrels and various medicinal herbs, shrubbery, and wildflowers. It is particularly noted for its abundant and unusual vines, which entwine the valley's ancient trees and shade its medieval stone carvings.

=== Lord Jie Ridge ===
The Lord Jie Ridge is the supposed site of Jie Zhitui's immolation by order of his close friend Duke Chong'er of Jin around 636 BC. He came to be revered as a Taoist immortal, and his temple and tomb have been sites of pilgrimage since his death. In the 6th century AD, a charred grove of trees were also a major attraction, with some miracles recorded. The Lord Jie Shrine or Pavilion of the Divine Jie (t 介神閣, s 介神阁, Jièshéngé) is the biggest grotto temple in China, with two ellipsoid columns supporting a cave 22 meters high, 40 meters wide, and 25 meters deep (72×130×82 ft). Its altar faces a 11-meter-tall (36 ft) idol of Jie Zhitui, with smaller idols of his mother and Xie Zhang on each side. His legend is retold in dozens of reliefs on the cave's columns and walls.

Cypress Ridge, also known as Baishu Ridge, covers a territory of about 2 km^{2} (3/4 sq mi), covered with picturesque cyprus and including the tomb constructed for Jie Zhitui by Duke Chong'er of Jin. It is reached by a path including 2000 stone steps. Individually notable trees include the Qin Cypress, one of the largest in China; the Mother-and-Son Cypress, considered to represent Jie and his mother; and the Dragon-Shaped Cypress, whose roots extend down the cliffside. Yuan, Ming, and Qing tombs are also found scattered around the area.

The Stele Forest includes diverse forms of Chinese calligraphy by about 100 people, including the emperor Li Shimin, the generals Zhang Liang and Wei Zheng, and the scholars Guo Tai and He Zhizhang. Many inscriptions retell the legends surrounding the mountain, particularly the stories of Jie Zhuitui.

=== Nun Lee Cliff ===
An area named after Princess Changzhao, a sister of Li Shimin who became a nun after experiencing a vision of the Buddha while visiting the mountain with the emperor in the spring of AD 641. The emperor built a temple for her, and the area is still decorated with Tang-era sculptures as well as the native cypresses and pines.

=== Qixian Canyon ===
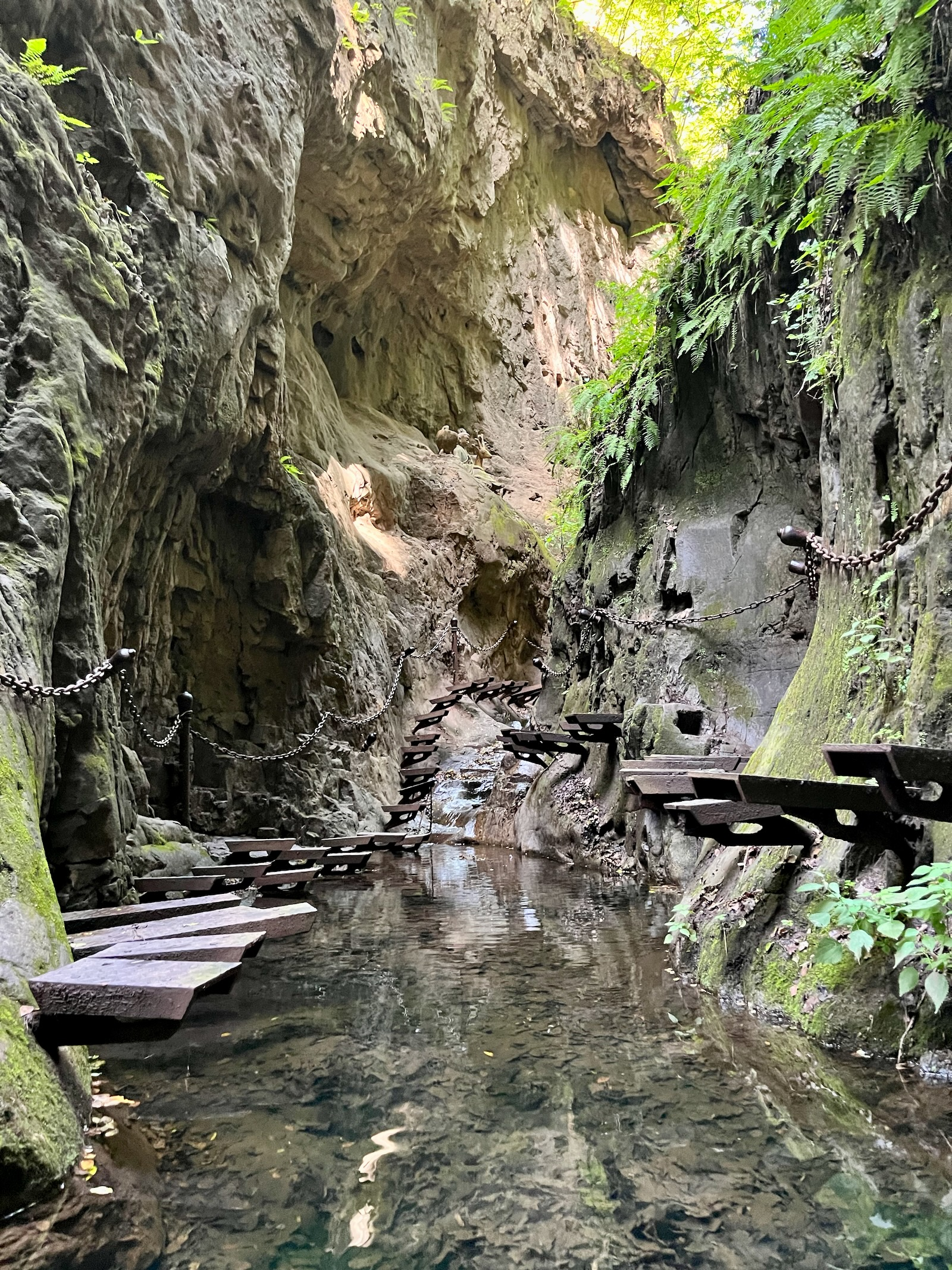
Qixian Canyon Hiking Path

The Qixian Canyon ("Canyon for Wise People") is a winding and undulous gully traversed by path, suspension bridges, and ancient-style ladders. Apart from the mountains and foliage, the area is decorated with stone inscriptions, unique rocks, springs, and waterfalls.

=== Shengru Spring ===
The spring, also known as Holy Breast or Stone Breast Spring, flows across dozens of rounded, moss-covered stones before falling 100 meters (330 ft) into a 180-meter-wide (590 ft) wide pond. During the Kangxi Era (17th–18th century), the local writer Liang Xiheng compared the sounds of the water drops to notes played on the Chinese zither. Other nearby sites include Wangfeng Gate; the Three Emperors Pavilion; the Hall of the Saintly Mother; and the Temples of the Four Dragons, the Five Sacred Mountains, the Fujianese water goddess Mazu, and the five dragons paying respect to their mother.

=== Shuitao Gully ===
The Shuitao or Water Billowing Gully includes the most picturesque natural scenery on Mount Mian, with its 16-kilometer (10 mi) path passing by and through thick forests and several dozen waterfalls.

=== Sky Bridge ===
The Sky Bridge is a plank road more than 300 meters (1,000 ft) long but less than one meter (three feet three inches) wide, suspended 200 m (700 ft) below the mountain's ridge but 300 m (1,000 ft) above the valley floor. Mist and clouds sometimes collect below it, creating a heavenly scene. Other nearby sites are Rabbit Bridge; a cypress whose shape causes it to be known as the Wangbai Dragon; and medieval fortresses around Shile Village and Dongshen Palace. The latter is a Taoist temple built by Li Shimin of the Tang in honor of Lao-tze.

=== Temple of All-Embracing Heaven ===
The Temple of All-Embracing Heaven, also known as the Daluo Palace (t 大羅宮, s 大罗宫, Dàluó Gōng), is the largest on the mountain. It reached its present size of 13 stories during restoration work ordered by Emperor Xuanzong of the Tang in AD 732. It is an important Taoist temple sometimes compared with Lhasa's Potala Palace. It has a stone inscription of Lao-tze's Tao Teh Ch'ing (Note: CRI—also an official government news source—reports that the Tao Teh Ch‘ing inscription is on wood rather than stone.) and (in its Baiyun Convent) another of the Buddhist Diamond Sutra. Its library supposedly houses China's largest repository of sutras.

=== Yidou Spring ===
Yidou Spring is a freshwater spring thought to be shaped like the character 斗. A local myth relates that in antiquity Mount Mian suffered a drought and became barren and desolate. The Primeval Lord of Heaven saw this and wet his brush in the East China Sea, then spread it along the length of the mountain. The land revived and grew a lush forest, with the largest drops becoming a number of springs around the mountain, including Yidou. The god is honored for this gift at the Dongzhen Palace, built inside a natural cave near the spring. Hanging sculptures decorate the cave with scenes from the Taoist understanding of the history of the universe. Other sites in the area include Elephant Trunk Hill, Deer Bridge, and the Gushan and Mountain-Fixing Rocks.

=== Yunfeng Temple ===
Yunfeng Temple (云峰寺, Yúnfēng Sì), also known as Baofu Temple, is located in the mountain's largest natural cave inside Baofu Rock. It was first built during the Three Kingdoms period (3rd century), was refurbished by Li Shimin, and now contains more than 200 rooms. It is dedicated to the Tang buddha Tian Zhichao under his title of "King of Immateriality". His clay-entombed mummy resides in the center of the temple's main hall. The temple's other treasures include the Kaiyuan Tablet, a couplet by Fushan, and a plaque granted by the Guangxu Emperor of the Qing.

=== Zhujia'ao Valley ===
Dongxuan Palace is a temple dedicated to the Lord of Lingbao. The rest of Zhujia'ao Valley is mostly associated with local legends about the family of the Hongwu Emperor, founder of China's Ming dynasty. Supposedly, his father Zhu Wusi had once come to the temples in the valley to worship Buddha and the other gods and returned to shower it with favor once his son ascended to the throne. Although Zhu had actually died before his son's enthronement, later Ming emperors visited Mt Mian to offer sacrifices and restore older temples.

=== Others ===
Other notable sites within the scenic area are Yuanhao Slope, the Immortal Stone Forest, the Hujie and Mother-and-Son Stones, Lotus-Leaf Spring, White Crow and Turtle Mountains, and the Fire-Preventing Cave. Other surviving temples include the Bamboo Forest Temple and the Iron Tile Temple.

== Transportation ==
The main road on Mount Mian now extends halfway up the peak. The paths to each major area are connected by bus routes.

== Events ==
The temples have an annual celebration during the Cold Food Festival honoring Jie Zhitui in the three days on and around the Tomb Sweeping Festival. Area Taoists also continue to perform the Great Offering on the 28th day of the 4th month of the Chinese lunar calendar.

== See also ==
- List of AAAAA-rated tourist attractions in the People's Republic of China
- List of mountains in the People's Republic of China
