= Wanrong County =

Wanrong 万荣县
- County
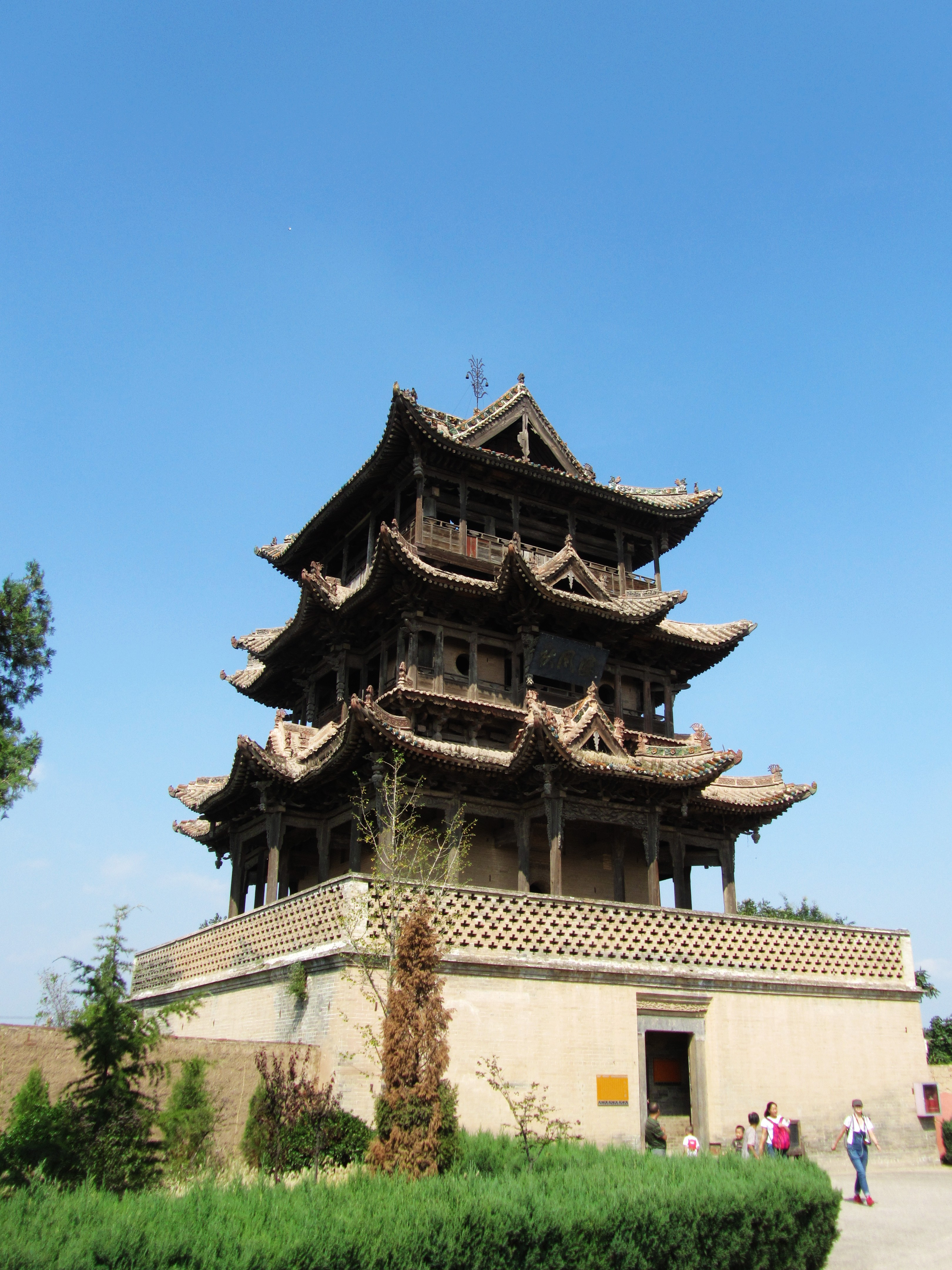
- The Qiufeng Tower in Wanrong Houtu Temple

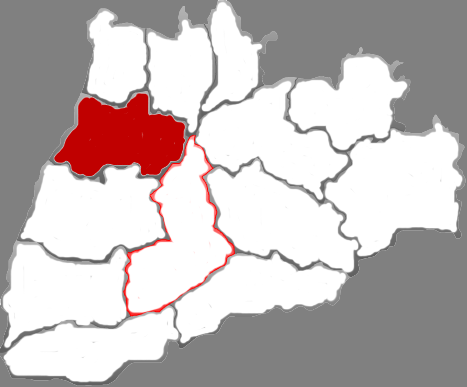
- Location in Yuncheng

- Location of the seat in Shanxi
- Coordinates: 35.393°N 110.713°E
- Country: People's Republic of China
- Province: Shanxi
- Prefecture-level city: Yuncheng

Population (2020)
  - Total: 361,956
- Time zone: UTC+8 (China Standard)

Wanrong County (simplified Chinese: 万荣县; traditional Chinese: 萬榮縣; pinyin: Wànróng Xiàn) is a county under the administration of Yuncheng City, in the southwest of Shanxi Province, China, bordering Shaanxi province to the west.

The county's Gushan was credited by the Records of Yicheng County compiled during the Qianlong Era of the Qing as being the actual "Mianshan" mentioned in the legends of Jie Zhitui concerning the origins of the Cold Food Festival, rather than the Mt Mian in Jinzhong Prefecture.

Sui dynasty Confucian philosopher Wang Tong was born in Longmen County, modern day Tonghua Township.

== Climate ==
Climate data for Wanrong, elevation 588 m (1,929 ft), (1991–2020 normals, extremes 1981–2010)
Month	Jan	Feb	Mar	Apr	May	Jun	Jul	Aug	Sep	Oct	Nov	Dec	Year
Record high °C (°F)	13.5 (56.3)	21.2 (70.2)	28.0 (82.4)	36.2 (97.2)	37.5 (99.5)	40.8 (105.4)	40.2 (104.4)	38.7 (101.7)	38.7 (101.7)	31.2 (88.2)	22.7 (72.9)	17.2 (63.0)	40.8 (105.4)
Mean daily maximum °C (°F)	4.2 (39.6)	8.7 (47.7)	15.1 (59.2)	21.9 (71.4)	26.8 (80.2)	31.0 (87.8)	31.9 (89.4)	30.0 (86.0)	25.2 (77.4)	19.2 (66.6)	12.1 (53.8)	5.6 (42.1)	19.3 (66.8)
Daily mean °C (°F)	−2.0 (28.4)	2.0 (35.6)	8.3 (46.9)	15.1 (59.2)	20.3 (68.5)	24.9 (76.8)	26.4 (79.5)	24.7 (76.5)	19.6 (67.3)	13.0 (55.4)	5.6 (42.1)	−0.6 (30.9)	13.1 (55.6)
Mean daily minimum °C (°F)	−7.0 (19.4)	−3.3 (26.1)	2.4 (36.3)	8.2 (46.8)	13.3 (55.9)	18.5 (65.3)	21.3 (70.3)	20.1 (68.2)	14.9 (58.8)	8.0 (46.4)	0.6 (33.1)	−5.2 (22.6)	7.7 (45.8)
Record low °C (°F)	−19.9 (−3.8)	−21.9 (−7.4)	−14.6 (5.7)	−6.2 (20.8)	−2.0 (28.4)	7.3 (45.1)	13.0 (55.4)	11.1 (52.0)	1.5 (34.7)	−7.0 (19.4)	−16.2 (2.8)	−19.1 (−2.4)	−21.9 (−7.4)
Average precipitation mm (inches)	6.0 (0.24)	8.7 (0.34)	13.1 (0.52)	32.1 (1.26)	47.5 (1.87)	58.8 (2.31)	87.0 (3.43)	93.3 (3.67)	79.3 (3.12)	45.5 (1.79)	19.1 (0.75)	3.9 (0.15)	494.3 (19.45)
Average precipitation days (≥ 0.1 mm)	2.9	3.5	4.3	5.9	7.3	8.1	9.8	8.7	9.7	7.4	5.2	2.6	75.4
Average snowy days	3.8	3.3	1.4	0.1	0	0	0	0	0	0	1.5	2.6	12.7
Average relative humidity (%)	51	52	51	52	53	56	67	71	71	69	65	54	59
Mean monthly sunshine hours	148.4	151.8	186.0	211.9	230.3	218.0	212.0	194.1	161.9	162.8	152.5	153.6	2,183.3
Percentage possible sunshine	47	49	50	54	53	50	48	47	44	47	50	51	49
Source: China Meteorological Administration
