= Xinlun =

1st-century Chinese political text

- Author: Huan Tan; Ban Gu (final chapter)
- Language: Classical Chinese
- Subject: Political philosophy
- Publication date: c. 26 CE
- Publication place: China

Chinese name
- Traditional Chinese: 新論
- Simplified Chinese: 新论
- Literal meaning: New Treatise
Transcriptions
Standard Mandarin
- Hanyu Pinyin: xīnlùn
- Wade–Giles: Hsin^{1}-lun^{4}
Southern Min
- Hokkien POJ: sin-lūn
Middle Chinese
- Middle Chinese: /sin.lwon/

Xinlun (Chinese: 新論; lit. 'New Treatise') is a partially-surviving Han dynasty text written by the scholar-official Huan Tan. Intended as a manual for rulers, it emphasizes political matters, but also featured discussions of philosophy, everyday life, occultism, culture, music, and the economy. It was presented to Emperor Guangwu of Han around 26 CE with its final chapter (on Guqin zither music) still unfinished. Sixty years later, Emperor Zhang of Han commissioned the scholar Ban Gu to complete the work.

The text was no longer in the Chinese imperial libraries by the 10th century, leading to an attempt to retrieve a copy from Korea in the late 11th century. It is unknown when the book fully disappeared. The text now survives in the form of collected fragments which were included in other works. New quotations continued to circulate in scholarly works for centuries after the work was lost, possibly sourced from Leishu (reference books) or simply fabricated. Several attempts to reconstruct the Xinlun were made in the 19th century by Qing dynasty scholars.

== Description ==
The Xinlun (lit. 'New Treatise'), also known as the Huanzi Xinlun (Chinese: 桓子新論; lit. 'Master Huan's New Treatise'), is a partially surviving text from the early Eastern Han dynasty, written in the early 1st century CE. In its full form, it described a wide variety of subjects, including philosophy, everyday life, occultism, culture, and the economy. Political philosophy is a prevalent focus of the work, but unlike its contemporary treatises, it draws more from contemporary social and political topics than from history. Huan and the Xinlun broadly aligned with the Old Text school of scholarly thought, although Huan's emphasis on empirical as opposed to spiritual and inferred knowledge was highly unusual among the school.

Huan intended the work as a manual for a ruler. Unlike many other Confucian scholars, he described legitimate and illegitimate rulers as equally able to misuse their power, writing that "the Way of the King is pure; his virtue is like that. The Way of the Hegemon is dappled and mixed; his achievement is like this. They both possess the Empire and rule over myriads of people. Their rule passes down to their sons and grandsons. They are the same in substance."

Although he did not explicitly mention legalism, Huan incorporated some of its concepts, emphasizing the importance of impartial officials in legal cases. However, he warned against unjustly severe punishment for crime and noted that good laws and prohibitions "meet the wishes of the multitude". He took rational approaches to some supernatural phenomena in the work, although relayed other supernatural events uncritically; he described enjoying "wonderful treatises and unusual texts". He describes death as inevitable and denied the existence of immortals, writing that there is "no such thing as the Way of the Immortals but that it had been invented by those who like strange things". In a segment of disputed authenticity, Huan wrote that the "spirit lives in the body like the flame blazing in the candle".

According to the 7th-century scholar and prince Li Xian, the book was originally divided into 16 sections, thirteen of which were divided into two chapters, for a total of 29 chapters.

== History ==
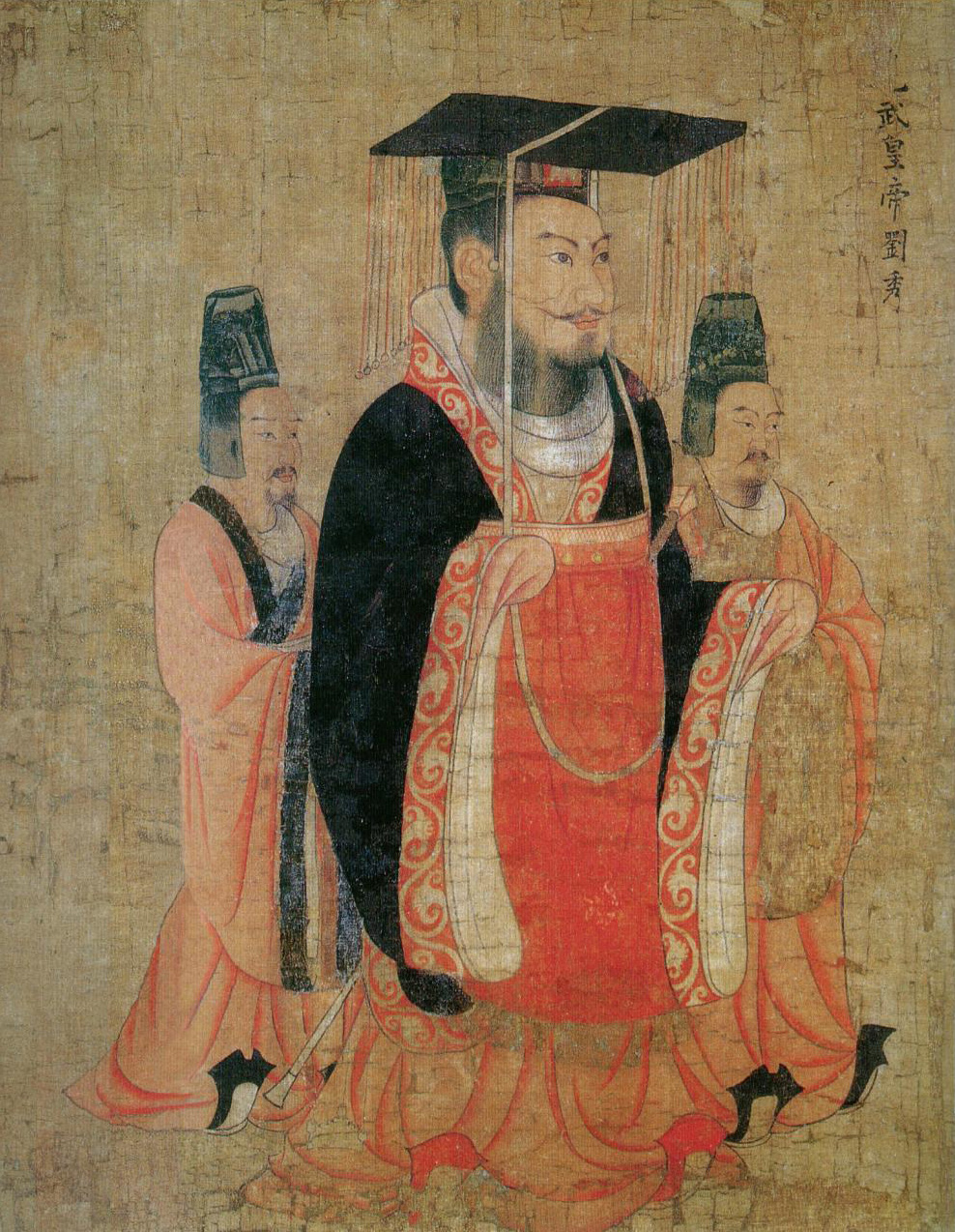
Emperor Guangwu of Han, to whom Huan presented the Xinlun around 26 CE

Huan Tan was a Chinese scholar-official who served under the Western Han, Xin, and Eastern Han dynasties, serving in positions such as the Prefect of the Music Bureau. In 26 CE, he was recommended as an official to Emperor Guangwu of Han, who had recently reestablished the Han dynasty. He received two minor political appointments and reportedly impressed the emperor by performing music during banquets. Around this time, he presented the partially-finished Xinlun to Emperor Guangwu. Huan may have intended it as an advisory text for the Emperor himself.

Huan died in 28 CE, with the final chapter on Guqin (qin) zither music still unfinished. Around 85, Emperor Zhang of Han commissioned the scholar Ban Gu to complete the work. Zhang was in the process of reorganizing the state's rituals and music, and likely sought to popularize Huan's conceptions of music. The chapter existed in a partially-finished form before the Xinlun's presentation around 26 CE, possibly as a separate book. Echoing the Zuo Zhuan, Huan and Gu described the Guqin as a means of self-cultivation and effective at preventing negative elements. After the completion of the work, Huan was honored with sacrifices at his tomb. Ban later used some of Huan's work as his basis for a chapter on drains and ditches in his Book of Han.

A copy of the work made it to Japan by the 9th century, as it is mentioned in the catalogue of scholar Fujiwara no Sukeyo. However, as the book does not reappear in later collections of lost Chinese works which were published around 1800, it likely became lost in Japan over the following centuries and was never printed. By the end of the Tang dynasty in the early 10th century, the Xinlun had become lost to the imperial libraries. In 1091, the Song dynasty ruler Zhezong attempted to obtain a copy of the work from Korea. Some 18th century scholars date the loss of the work alternatively to the 10th century or the Southern Song (12th–13th centuries), while others believed it persisted as long as the 17th century due to the emergence of new quotations in Ming dynasty texts.

The book now exists only in various fragments found across other surviving works. Fragments continued circulating long after the book had been lost, likely taken from Leishu (reference books) or simply fabricated. While fragments predating the Song are likely authentic and taken from the actual work, some later fragments are dubious. One fragment reproduced by the 17th-century scholar Dong Yue refers to a likely non-existent work by the 5th-century BCE scholar Li Kui.

The first attempt to compile all the fragments of the work was made by the scholar Sun Fengyi around 1800. Over the following decades, historian Yan Kejun made an attempt to reconstruct the work according to Li Xian's description, often combining multiple attested versions of the same passages together into one. Similar attempts were made by other Qing scholars later in the 19th century. An English translation of the collected fragments was produced by the Czech scholar Timoteus Pokora in 1975, including three previously unattested quotations included in an 18th–century work attributed to the scholar Hui Dong. The Shanghai People's Publishing House published a modern edition of Yan's reconstruction in 1977.
