= Timoteus Pokora =

- Born: 26 June 1928; Brno, Czechoslovakia
- Died: 7 November 1985 (aged 57)
- Education: University of Brno; Charles University in Prague; Peking University
- Scientific career
- Fields: Chinese history, law
- Workplaces: Czech Academy of Sciences

Timoteus Pokora (26 June 1928 – 11 July 1985) was a Czech sinologist known for his translations and studies of Chinese literature and law, particularly dealing with the Han dynasty.

== Life and career ==
Timoteus Pokora was born on 26 June 1928 in Brno, which was then part of the First Czechoslovak Republic. He did undergraduate studies at the University of Brno, where he studied law. He then pursued graduate studies in Sinology at Charles University in Prague, where wrote a thesis on Han dynasty philosopher Wang Chong and received a master's degree in 1955. He then spent two years in China at Peking University studying and writing a doctoral dissertation on Han dynasty scholar Huan Tan.

Pokora returned to Czechoslovakia and worked as a researcher in the Oriental Institute (Czech: Orientální Ústav) of the Czech Academy of Sciences. Czechoslovakia was then under the dictatorial control of the Communist Party of Czechoslovakia, and their strict censorship caused Pokora great difficulty in communicating and collaborating with scholars in free Western countries, except for the two years when he served as a lecturer at Heidelberg University (1965–66) and as a research fellow at the University of Michigan (1969–70). He was summarily dismissed from his position at the Czech Academy of Sciences in 1969 in the aftermath of the Warsaw Pact invasion of Czechoslovakia, and spent the rest of his life continuing to perform and publish his research as far as he was politically able to do.

Pokora died in 1985 at the age of 57.

== Selected works ==
- Pokora, Timoteus (1975). Hsin-lun (New Treatise) and Other Writings by Huan T'an (43 BC – 28 AD). Michigan Papers in Chinese Studies 20. Ann Arbor: University of Michigan Press.
