= Xianshenlou =

Coordinates: 37°02′03″N 111°55′28″E

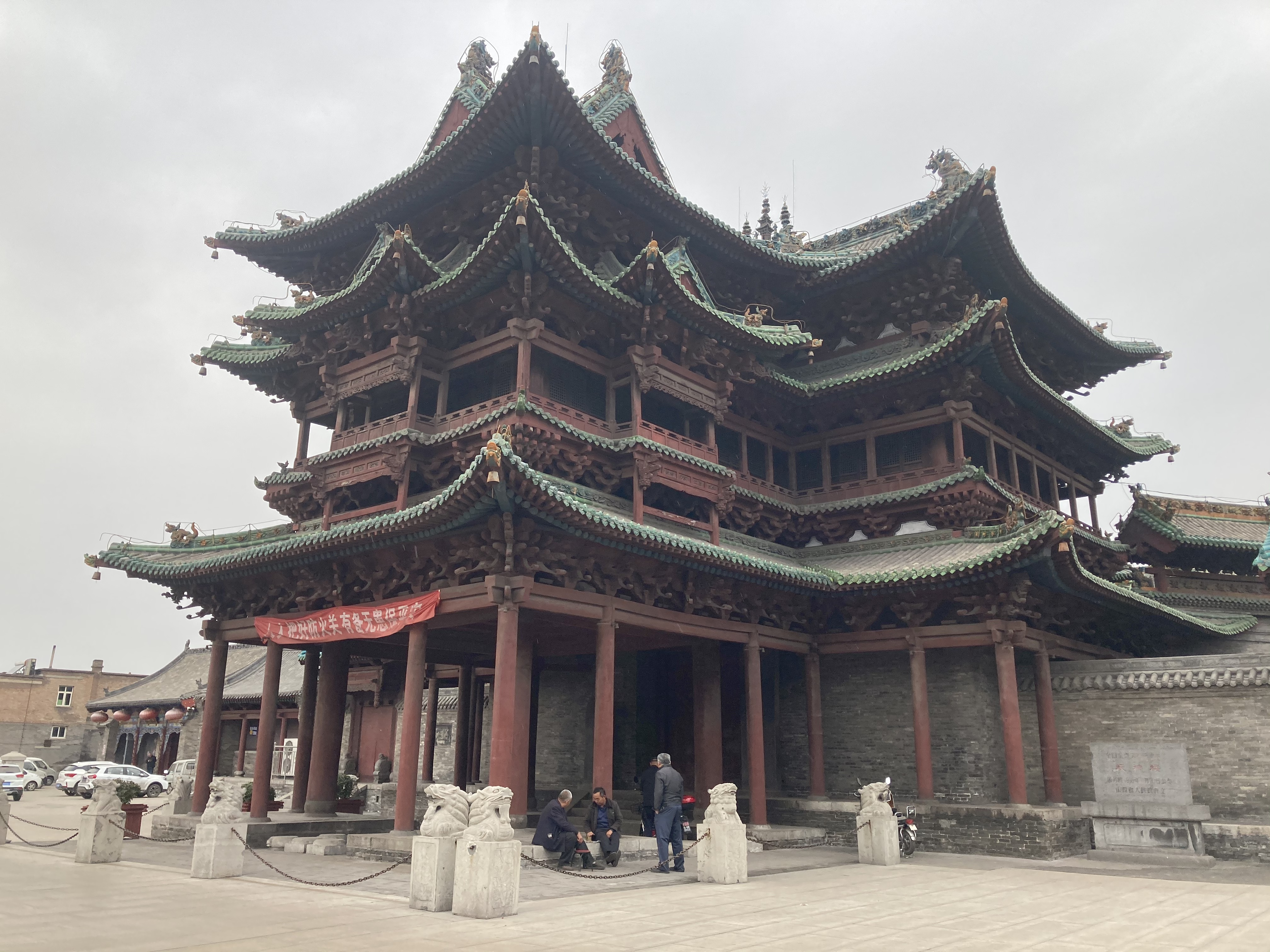
Xianshenlou in October 2020

Xianshenlou (simplified Chinese: 祆神楼; traditional Chinese: 祆神樓; lit. 'Zoroaster Tower') is a pavilion-style building located in Jiexiu, Shanxi, China, first built in the Song dynasty as the stage that formed part of larger Zoroastrian temple complex.

While the temple itself has since been demolished and replaced by a Taoist monastery, Xianshenlou is considered to be the sole surviving Zoroastrian building in China, and as such was listed as a Major Historical and Cultural Site Protected at the National Level in 1996.

== Gallery ==
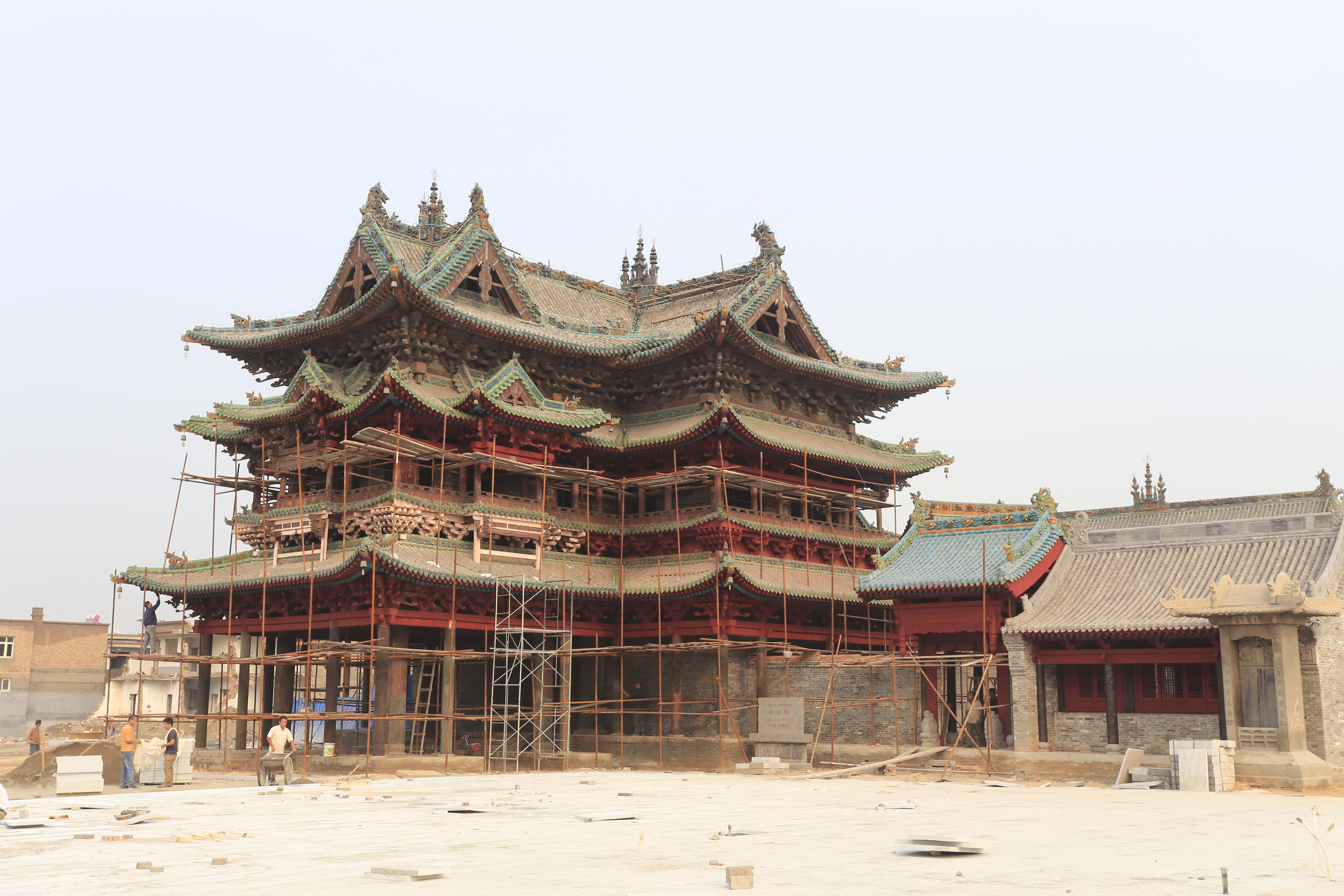
Xianshen Lou during its refurbishment in 2020

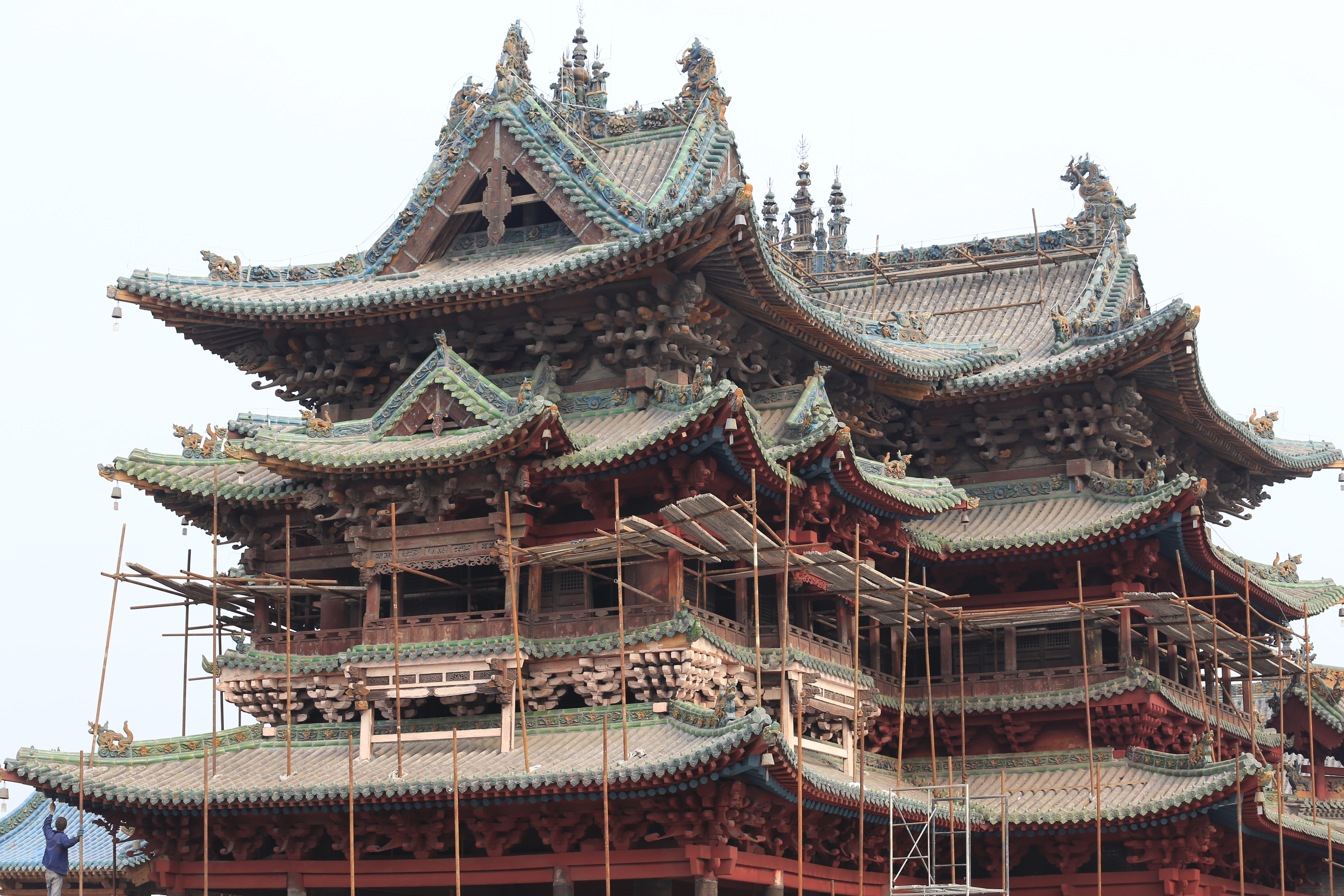
Xianshen Lou

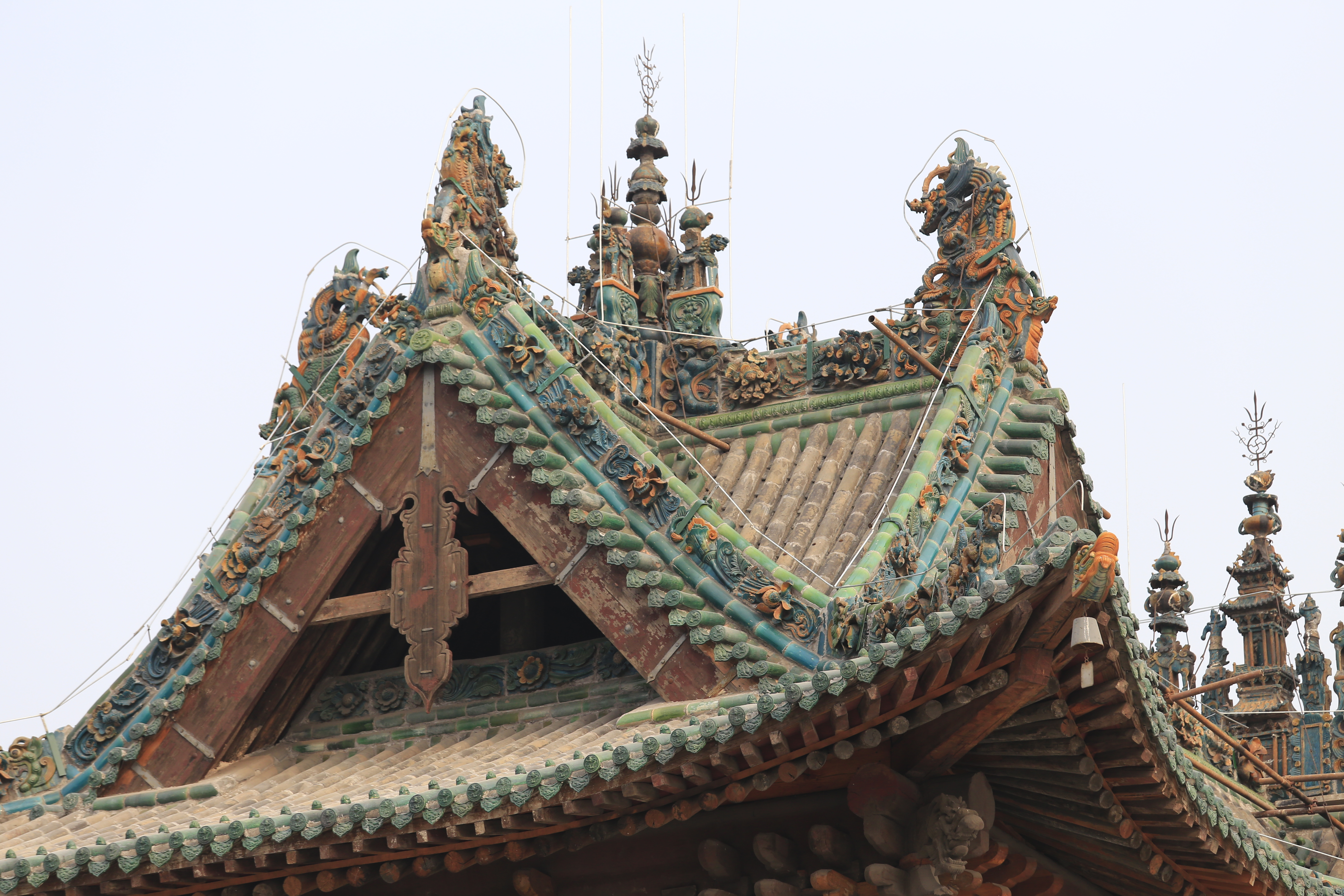
A closer view of the roof of Xianshen Lou

== See also ==
- Sogdian Daēnās
- Zoroastrianism in China
