= Princess Caoguo =

Elder sister of the Hongwu Emperor (1317–1350)

Zhu Fonü 朱佛女
- Princess Caoguo
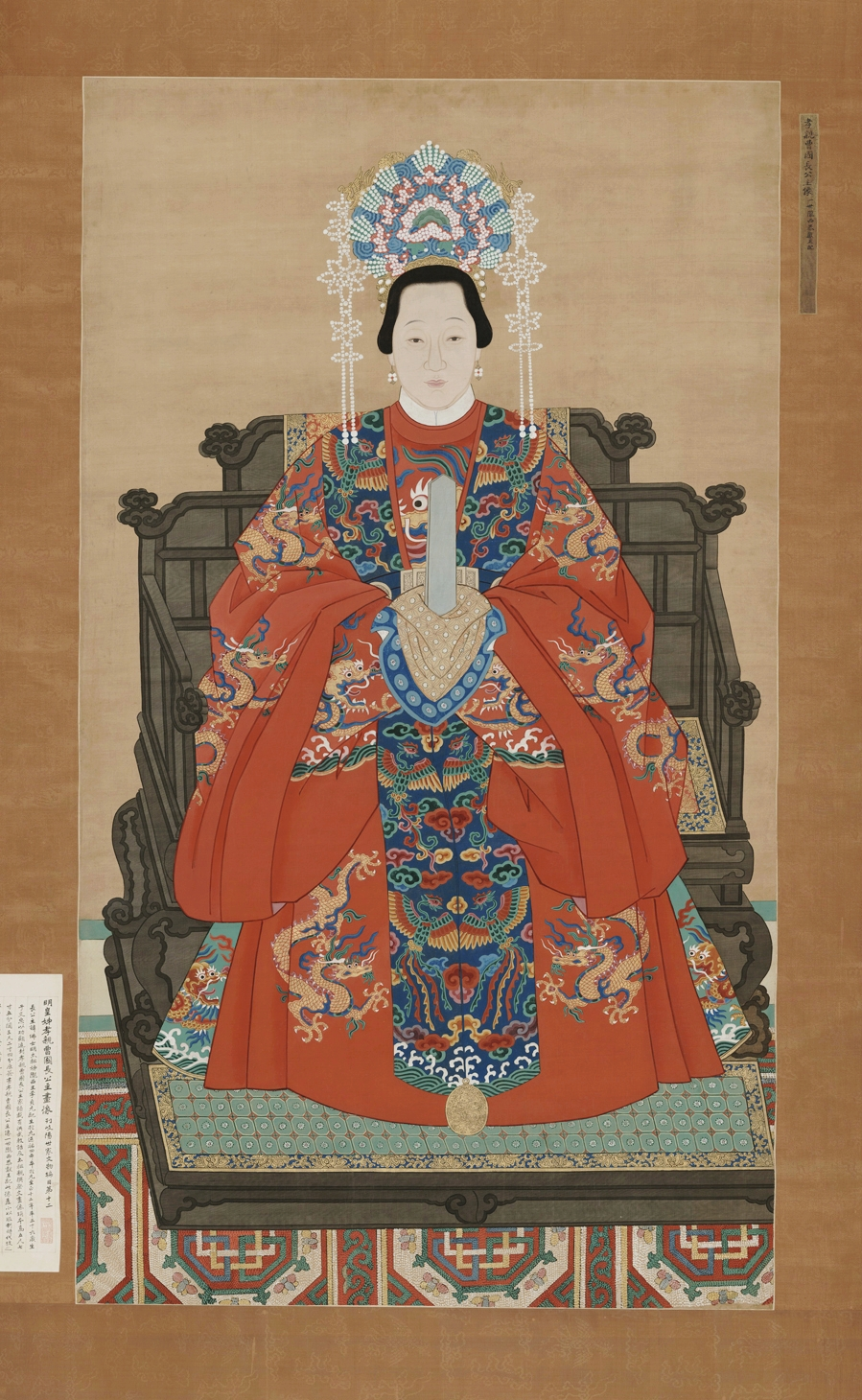
- Posthumous portrait of Princess Caoguo on a hanging scroll, held in the National Museum of China
- Born: 1315; Yangjiadun, Xuyi County, Si Prefecture (present-day Xuyi County, Huai'an, Jiangsu)
- Died: 1350 (aged 34–35)
- Spouse: Li Zhen
- Issue: Li Wenzhong
- Father: Zhu Shizhen
- Mother: Lady Chen

Chinese name
- Traditional Chinese: 曹國公主
- Simplified Chinese: 曹国公主
- Literal meaning: Princess of the State of Cao
Transcriptions
Standard Mandarin
- Hanyu Pinyin: Cáoguó gōngzhǔ

Personal name
- Chinese: 朱佛女
Transcriptions
Standard Mandarin
- Hanyu Pinyin: Zhū Fónǚ

Princess Caoguo (1315–1350), personal name Zhu Fonü, was an elder sister of Zhu Yuanzhang, the Hongwu Emperor, the founding emperor of the Ming dynasty of China. She was also the mother of the Ming general Li Wenzhong. Born into a peasant family in Xuyi County, Jiangsu, during the Yuan dynasty, Zhu Fonü married Li Zhen and died before her brother rose to power. In 1365, after Zhu Yuanzhang proclaimed himself King of Wu, he posthumously honored his sister as Princess Xiaoqin. She later received the titles Grand Princess Longxi in 1370 and Grand Princess Caoguo in 1372.

== Biography ==
Zhu Fonü was born in 1315 at Yangjiadun, in Xuyi County, Si Prefecture, China (present-day Xuyi County, Huai'an, Jiangsu), during the Mongol-led Yuan dynasty. She was the second daughter of Zhu Shizhen and Lady Chen. When Zhu Fonü entered her teenage years, she and her parents wandered for some time before settling in East Township, Zhongli County, Hao Prefecture (present-day Zhaofu Village, Mingguang, Anhui). In 1331, at age 16, she married 28-year-old Li Zhen (李貞), a native of Lingji Village (then under Xuyi County, now part of Mingguang). (Note: Following the death of his father in 1330, Li Zhen moved with his mother and the rest of the family to East Township to escape the turmoil. At the time, Zhu Fonü had reached marriageable age, but successive years of disasters had prevented her from finding a suitable match. After the Zhu family settled in East Township, her father arranged her marriage to Li Zhen, who was twelve years her senior.) She bore him a son, Li Wenzhong (李文忠), eight years later. Zhu Fonü was frugal from a young age and, after her marriage, helped Li Zhen manage their household. A Buddhist, she followed a largely vegetarian diet and regularly paid homage to the North Star at night. The couple were not wealthy. In 1350, she died and was temporarily buried in West Township, Zhongli County (near present-day Tangfu Village, Fengyang County, Anhui).

Zhu Fonü had a close relationship with her younger brother Zhu Chongba, the future Hongwu Emperor. Born into an impoverished peasant family, she helped her parents with household duties and farm work from a young age, while also assisting and caring for Zhu Chongba during his difficult childhood. She often gave her brother her share of food and other necessities, and after her marriage to Li Zhen, she continued to assist her natal family with her husband's support. Zhu Chongba later expressed his appreciation for the support provided by his sister and brother-in-law, crediting them with helping him endure the hardships of his early years.

In 1352, Zhu Chongba joined the Red Turban rebels under the command of Guo Zixing, at which time he adopted the name Zhu Yuanzhang. After Guo died, command of his army passed to Zhu Yuanzhang, who gradually rose to become a prominent rebel leader during the Red Turban Rebellion. In 1365, after Zhu Yuanzhang proclaimed himself King of Wu in Nanjing, he posthumously honored Zhu Fonü with the title Princess Xiaoqin (孝親公主). (Note: The title "Xiaoqin" ('Filial toward Parents') emphasized Zhu Fonü's filial devotion and service to her parents and highlighted her virtue of filial piety.) Two years later, Li Wenzhong, wishing to relocate his mother's tomb, sought approval from Zhu Yuanzhang. Upon receiving approval, he reinterred Zhu Fonü at the Lengshuijian plains of Lingji Township, Xuyi County (present-day entrance to Dali Village, Mingguang). In 1368, Zhu Yuanzhang established the Ming dynasty and became the Hongwu Emperor. The Emperor honored his sister as Grand Princess Longxi (隴西長公主) in 1370. In 1372, when he named Li Wenzhong the Duke of Cao, the Emperor changed her title to Grand Princess Caoguo (曹國長公主) Li Wenzhong is regarded as the third-ranking general of the Ming founding. Princess Caoguo achieved no notable accomplishments of her own and is known mainly in relation to her brother and son.
