= Zhu Shizhen =

Father of the Hongwu Emperor (1281–1344)

Zhu Shizhen 朱世珍
- Born: Zhu Wusi; 1281; Jurong
- Died: 1344 (aged 62–63)
- Burial: Ming Imperial Mausoleum (in present-day Fengyang, Anhui)
- Spouse: Lady Chen
- Issue Detail: Hongwu Emperor; Princess Caoguo
Posthumous name
- Emperor Chun (Note: Chinese: 淳皇帝; pinyin: Chún Huángdì)
Temple name
- Renzu (Note: Chinese: 仁祖; pinyin: Rénzǔ)
- Father: Zhu Chuyi (Note: Honored posthumously as emperor, with the temple name Xizu (熙祖; 'Glorious Ancestor') and the posthumous name Emperor Yu (裕皇帝; 'Prospering Emperor').)
- Mother: Lady Wang (Note: Honored posthumously as Empress Yu (裕皇后))

Chinese name
- Chinese: 朱世珍
Transcriptions
Standard Mandarin
- Hanyu Pinyin: Zhū Shìzhēn

Birth name
- Chinese: 朱五四
Transcriptions
Standard Mandarin
- Hanyu Pinyin: Zhū Wǔsì

Zhu Shizhen (1281–1344), born Zhu Wusi, was the father of Zhu Yuanzhang, the Hongwu Emperor, the founding emperor of the Ming dynasty of China.

Zhu Shizhen was a native of Jurong. His father, Zhu Chuyi, later relocated the family to Xuyi in Si Prefecture, and in subsequent years Zhu Shizhen moved to Zhongli in Hao Prefecture with his wife of the Chen clan and their children. In 1344, when a severe drought devastated the lands north of the Huai River, Zhu Shizhen, Lady Chen, and their eldest son succumbed one after another. After founding the Ming dynasty in 1368, Zhu Yuanzhang posthumously elevated his father as Emperor Chun, with the temple name Renzu, while his mausoleum was established at Fengyang as the Imperial Mausoleum.

== Early life ==
Zhu Wusi was born in 1281 (Note: In the Proceedings of the 11th International Symposium on Ming History and Huai'an Historical and Cultural Studies, Volume 2, it is stated that Zhu was born in 1281. However, according to Hu Hansheng's Imperial Mausoleums of the Ming Dynasty, Zhu was born in 1279.) at Zhujiaxiang, Tongde Township, Jurong County, Jiangsu, China. His father, Zhu Chuyi, was registered as a "gold-washing household" (taojin hu) under the Yuan dynasty, which required him to deliver a fixed amount of gold annually to the authorities. As there were no gold mines in Jurong, Zhu Chuyi was forced to sell agricultural products for cash and then purchase gold to meet the quota—an arduous and costly burden. Unable to withstand the continued pressure from officials, in 1289, when Zhu Wusi was eight years old, Zhu Chuyi moved the family to Sunjiagang, located thirteen li north of Si Prefecture (in modern Xuyi County, Huai'an, Jiangsu).

Zhu Wusi married a woman of the Chen family, (Note: Lady Chen was a native of Jinli Town in Xuyi County. Her father served as a personal guard under the Song dynasty general Zhang Shijie. After the failure of the anti-Yuan resistance, he was forced to flee from government persecution and eventually settled in Jinli Town.) who bore him a son, Zhu Chongsi, and a daughter while they resided in Xuyi. After the death of his father, the family sank into poverty. For the sake of survival, Zhu Wusi and his elder brother Zhu Wuyi were compelled to abandon their ancestral home and seek livelihoods elsewhere. Zhu Wuyi settled with his household in East Township, Zhongli County, Hao Prefecture (present-day Zhaofu Village north of Mingguang, Anhui). Zhu Wusi, meanwhile, moved his family to Lingbi County, Anhui, where his second son, Zhu Chongliu, was born. They later relocated to Hong County (modern Si County, Anhui), where his third son, Zhu Chongqi, was born, (Note: In Xia Yurun's Zhu Yuanzhang and Fengyang, it is mentioned that Zhu Wusi took refuge in Wuhe County and his sons Chongliu and Chongqi were born there. However, according to Wei Su's Imperial Mausoleum Stele (皇陵碑), Zhu Chongliu was born in Lingbi County and Zhu Chongqi was born in Hong County.) and eventually made their home in East Township, Zhongli County. On 21 October 1328, Lady Chen gave birth to her and Zhu Wusi's fourth son, Zhu Chongba, the future Hongwu Emperor.

== Later life and death ==
In 1337, (Note: There are conflicting accounts of when Zhu moved to West Township in Zhongli. According to Hu Hansheng's On the Feng Shui of Ming Imperial Tombs, Zhu moved there in 1337. However, Chen Wutong's Collection of Autumn Fruits states that he moved there in 1338. Both sources mention that he later moved to Gucun Village in Taiping Township "the following year", but they disagree on the specific year. Hu states that the move occurred in 1338, while Chen dates it to 1339.) pressed by hardship, the family again moved, this time to West Township of Zhongli (near present-day Tangfu Village, Fengyang). The following year, they relocated to Gucun Village in Taiping Township of Zhongli (modern Ershiying Village, Fengyang County). There, they became tenant farmers under the landlord Liu Jide (劉繼德), a man known for his harshness. Despite their toil, the Zhu household remained in dire straits. In 1344, the Huai River basin suffered a catastrophic drought: seedlings withered, fields cracked, and famine was soon followed by locust swarms and plague. On the sixth day of the fourth month that year, (Note: This date corresponds to 18 May 1344 on the Julian calendar.) Zhu Wusi, unable to afford medical treatment, succumbed to the plague aged 64. His eldest son perished later that same night. On the twenty-second day of the same month, (Note: This date corresponds to 3 June 1344 on the Julian calendar.) the 59-year-old Lady Chen also died of the illness. Zhu Chongliu and Zhu Chongba implored their landlord Liu Jide for a small burial plot to inter their parents, but he reviled them and refused. At length, Liu's elder brother, Liu Jizu (劉繼祖), took pity and granted them a patch of land. (Note: In 1378, the Hongwu Emperor posthumously accorded Liu Jizu the title of Marquis of Yihui (義惠侯), and his wife, Lady Lou, the title of Marquise.) Lacking the means for coffins, Zhu Chongba wrapped the bodies of his parents in old quilts and buried them hastily.

== After death ==
In 1352, Zhu Chongba joined the Red Turban rebels under the command of Guo Zixing, at which time he adopted the name Zhu Yuanzhang. He also posthumously changed his father's name from Zhu Wusi to Zhu Shizhen. After Guo died, command of his army passed to Zhu Yuanzhang, who gradually rose to become a prominent rebel leader during the Red Turban Rebellion. In 1366, believing that his father's burial rites had been too modest, yet fearing that reburial might disturb the geomantic currents of the land, Zhu Yuanzhang resolved instead to enlarge the burial mound so that it might conform to the standards of an imperial mausoleum.

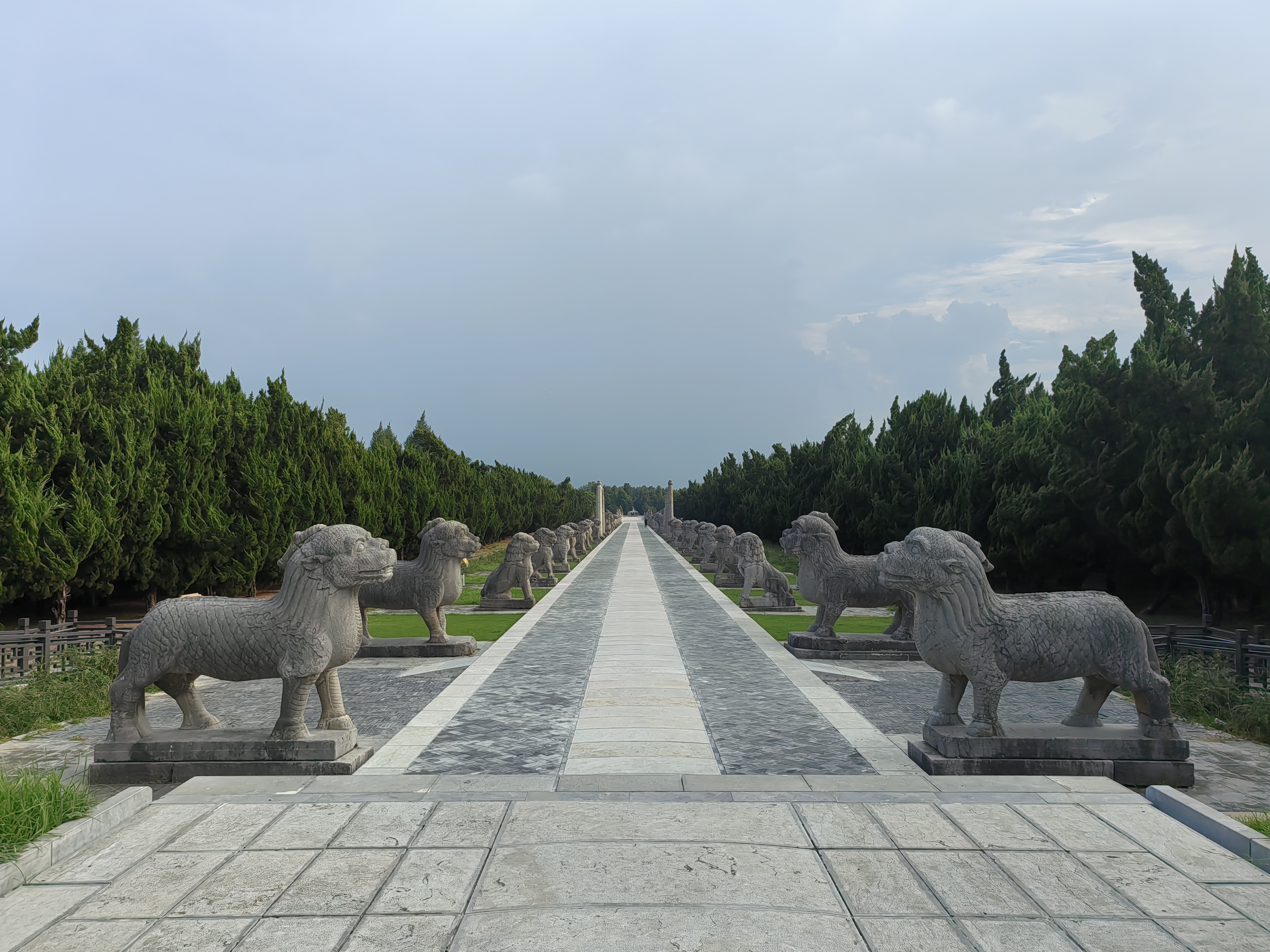
Ming Imperial Mausoleum, tomb of Zhu Shizhen and his wife, Lady Chen, in Fengyang County, Chuzhou, Anhui.

In 1363, Han Lin'er, the nominal sovereign of the Red Turbans, posthumously bestowed a series of exalted titles upon Zhu Shizhen, including Duke of Wu, (Note: The tiles were: Executor and Assistant Minister of the Three Offices (開府儀同三司), Senior Pillar of the State (上柱國), Head of Privy Councilor for Extraordinary Affairs (錄軍國重事), Right Chancellor of the Central Secretariat (中書右丞相), Grand Commandant (太尉), and Duke of Wu (吳國公).) and honored Lady Chen as duchess. After founding the Ming dynasty and becoming the Hongwu Emperor in 1368, Zhu Yuanzhang posthumously honored his father as Emperor Chun (淳皇帝; 'Pure Emperor') with the temple name Renzu (仁祖; 'Benevolent Ancestor'), while Lady Chen was honored as Empress Chun (淳皇后). Zhu Shizhen's resting place was renamed the Mausoleum of Emperor Renzu. In 1369, the tomb was redesignated the Ying Mausoleum (英陵) and, later that year, renamed the Imperial Mausoleum (皇陵). The Imperial Mausoleum Guard was also established to protect it. The Emperor first ordered the construction of Zhu Shizhen's mausoleum in 1369 and renewed the project in 1375. The mausoleum was completed in 1379.

== Family ==
=== Issue ===
Zhu Shizhen had six children of his marriage with Lady Chen (1286–1344).

- Zhu Chongsi (朱重四), later Zhu Xinglong (朱興隆), honored posthumously as Prince of Nanchang (南昌王; 1307–1344), first son
- Zhu Chongliu (朱重六), later Zhu Xingsheng (朱興盛), honored posthumously as Prince of Xuyi (盱眙王), second son
- Zhu Chongqi (朱重七), later Zhu Xingzu (朱興祖), honored posthumously as Prince of Linhuai (臨淮王), third son
- Zhu Chongba (朱重八), later Zhu Xingzong (朱興宗), later Zhu Yuanzhang (朱元璋), the Hongwu Emperor (洪武帝; 21 October 1328 – 24 June 1398), fourth son
- First daughter, honored posthumously as Grand Princess Taiyuan (太原長公主). Married to Wang Qiyi (王七一).
- Zhu Fonü (朱佛女), honored posthumously as Princess Caoguo (曹國長公主; 1317–1351), second daughter. Married to Li Zhen (李貞; 1304–1379).

=== Ancestry ===
Ancestors of Zhu Shizhen

16. Zhu Zhongba
8. Zhu Bailiu
17. Lady Chen
4. Zhu Sijiu
9. Lady Hu
2. Zhu Chuyi
5. Lady Hou
1. Zhu Shizhen
3. Lady Wang
