= Jiexiu =

Jiexiu 介休市 Kiehsiu
- County-level city
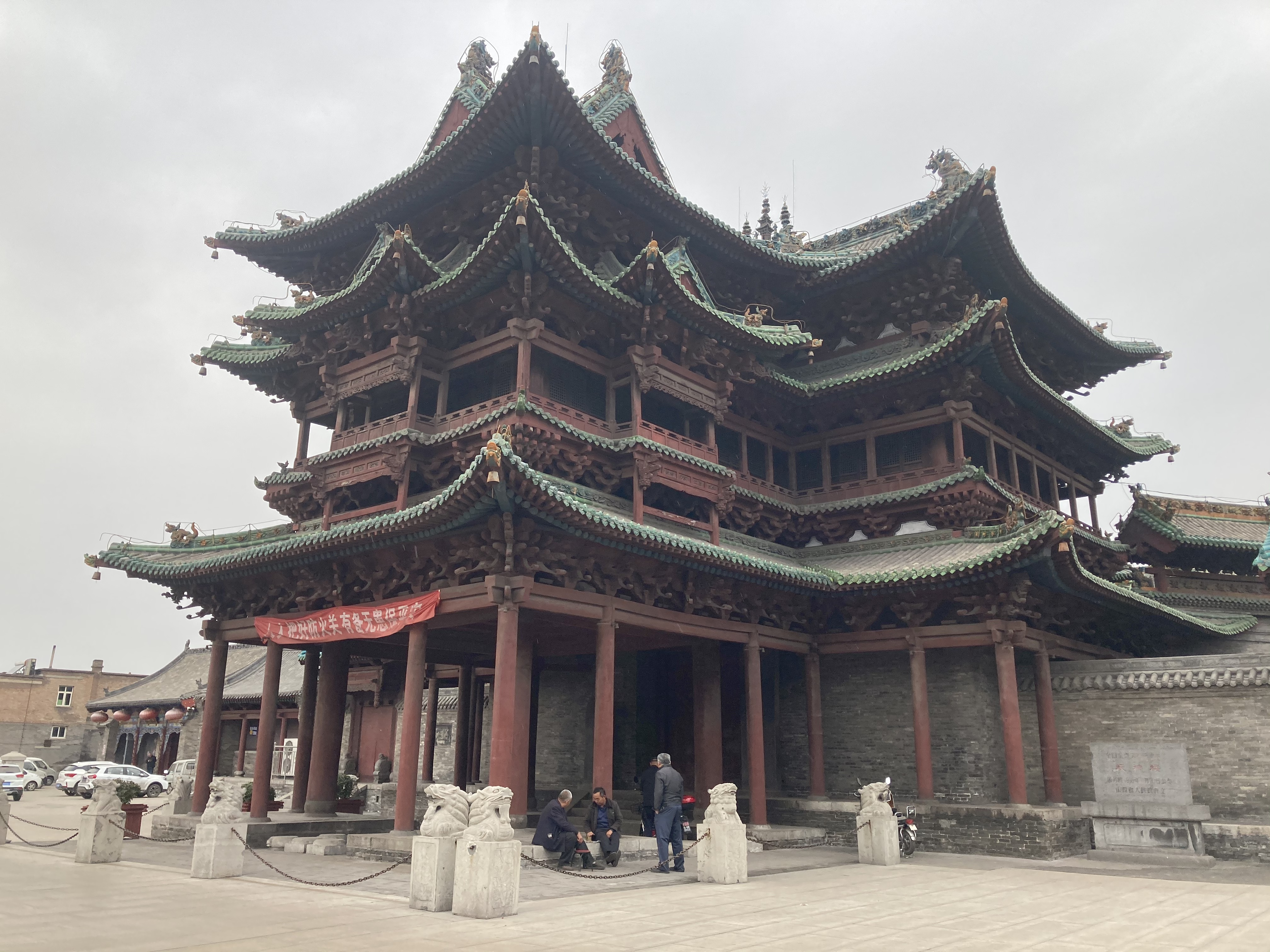
- Xianshenlou

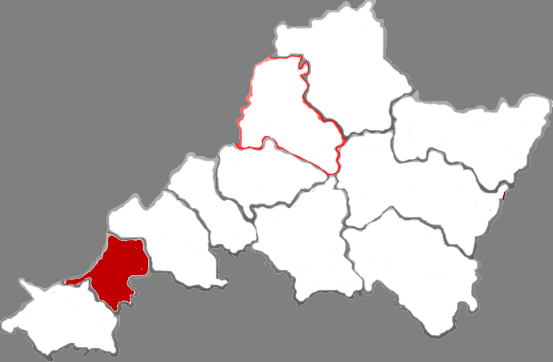
- Jiexiu in Jinzhong

- Location in Shanxi
- Coordinates: 37°01′37″N 111°55′01″E
- Country: People's Republic of China
- Province: Shanxi
- Prefecture-level city: Jinzhong

Area
  - County-level city: 743.7 km^{2} (287.1 sq mi)
  - Urban: 42.00 km^{2} (16.22 sq mi)
- Elevation: 756 m (2,480 ft)

Population (2017)
  - County-level city: 437,000
  - Urban: 222,100
- Time zone: UTC+8 (China Standard)
- Postal code: 032000
- Area code: 0354
- Website: http://en.cnsanjia.com/

Jiexiu
- Chinese: 介休市
- Literal meaning: City of Jie Zitui's Eternal Rest
Transcriptions
Standard Mandarin
- Hanyu Pinyin: Jièxiūshi
- Wade–Giles: Chieh-hsiu Shih

Former names

Mianshang
- Traditional Chinese: 綿上
- Simplified Chinese: 绵上
- Literal meaning: Downy (Note: ⟨綿⟩ anciently referred to silk floss and by extension "weak", "soft", "downy", although in modern Chinese it more often refers to cotton.) Heights
Transcriptions
Standard Mandarin
- Hanyu Pinyin: Miánshǎng
- Wade–Giles: Mien-shang

Pingchang
- Chinese: 平昌
- Literal meaning: Peaceful-&-Prosperous
Transcriptions
Standard Mandarin
- Hanyu Pinyin: Píngchāng
- Wade–Giles: P‘ing-ch‘ang

Jiezhou
- Chinese: 介州
- Literal meaning: Jie Prefecture
Transcriptions
Standard Mandarin
- Hanyu Pinyin: Jièzhōu
- Wade–Giles: Chieh-chou

Jiexiu is a county-level city in the central part of Shanxi Province, China. It is under the administration of the prefecture-level city of Jinzhong and is located in the latter's western confines. Notable sites in and around Jiexiu include Mount Mian, Zhangbi Fortress, Houtu Temple and Xianshenlou.

== Names ==
The territory around Mt Mian was known as Mianshang under the Zhou. By the Jin, the territory was known as Dingyang and the settlement at Jiexiu proper as Pingchang. Under the Northern Wei (4th–5th century), both became known as Jiexiu Commandery. Under the Tang, this was renamed Jiezhou AD 618–627.

== History ==
Mianshang was supposedly set apart by Duke Chong'er to endow sacrifices for his retainer Jie Zhitui c. 636 BC. The early histories state that Jie had loyally followed Chong'er in exile around China for 19 years but, when Chong'er was installed as duke of Jin by a Qin army, Jie had chosen to retire as a hermit rather than debase himself by asking for favors. In time, this caused him to be seen as a Taoist immortal. Later legend embellished the tale, having Jie save Chong'er from starvation by cooking a soup made from meat from his own thigh only to be killed when Chong'er listened to advice from Jin courtiers that the way to drive him out of the mountains was to light a forest fire. The idea was that Jie's duty to his mother would overcome his pride and they would flee together; instead, their corpses were found days later beneath a willow. Temples were erected in Jie's honor and, by the Han, the people of Shanxi tried to curry favor with his spirit by observing a Cold Food Festival in the dead of winter. They ignored repeated attempts to ban it although, as it moved to spring and spread throughout China, it eventually developed into the present-day Tomb-Sweeping Festival.

During the Warring States Period, the area of Jiexiu was held by Zhao before its conquest by Qin. Under the Han, it was part of Dingyang County (t 定陽縣, s 定阳县, Dìngyáng Xiàn) in Shang Commandery. Jiexiu County was created under the Jin, but with its seat southeast of the current town. The Northern Wei moved to the present location—then known as Pingchang—around AD 484 and made it the seat of a commandery. This was made a county again by the Sui in 598, restored by the Tang in 617, and changed to a prefecture the next year.

== Climate ==
Jiexiu experiences a semi-arid climate (Köppen climate classification BSk). Spring is dry, with frequent dust storms, followed by early summer heat waves. Summer tends to be warm to hot with most of the year's rainfall concentrated in July and August. Winter is long and cold, but dry and sunny. Because of the aridity, there tends to be considerable diurnal variation in temperature, except during the summer. The monthly 24-hour average temperature ranges from −4.0 °C (24.8 °F) in January to 24.6 °C (76.3 °F) in July, while the annual mean is 11.18 °C (52.1 °F). With monthly percent possible sunshine ranging from 49% in July to 60% in May, the city receives 2,425 hours of bright sunshine annually.

Climate data for Jiexiu, elevation 746 m (2,448 ft), (1991–2020 normals, extremes 1951–2010)
Month	Jan	Feb	Mar	Apr	May	Jun	Jul	Aug	Sep	Oct	Nov	Dec	Year
Record high °C (°F)	14.0 (57.2)	22.9 (73.2)	30.2 (86.4)	36.3 (97.3)	35.1 (95.2)	40.6 (105.1)	38.7 (101.7)	38.4 (101.1)	36.8 (98.2)	29.2 (84.6)	25.4 (77.7)	17.7 (63.9)	40.6 (105.1)
Mean daily maximum °C (°F)	3.0 (37.4)	7.5 (45.5)	14.1 (57.4)	21.1 (70.0)	26.3 (79.3)	30.3 (86.5)	30.9 (87.6)	28.8 (83.8)	24.4 (75.9)	18.6 (65.5)	10.9 (51.6)	4.3 (39.7)	18.4 (65.0)
Daily mean °C (°F)	−3.6 (25.5)	0.3 (32.5)	6.8 (44.2)	13.7 (56.7)	19.2 (66.6)	23.1 (73.6)	24.7 (76.5)	22.6 (72.7)	17.6 (63.7)	11.5 (52.7)	4.2 (39.6)	−1.8 (28.8)	11.5 (52.8)
Mean daily minimum °C (°F)	−9.1 (15.6)	−5.5 (22.1)	0.3 (32.5)	6.3 (43.3)	11.5 (52.7)	15.8 (60.4)	19.1 (66.4)	17.5 (63.5)	12.0 (53.6)	5.5 (41.9)	−1.1 (30.0)	−6.7 (19.9)	5.5 (41.8)
Record low °C (°F)	−21.0 (−5.8)	−22.6 (−8.7)	−10.0 (14.0)	−5.7 (21.7)	−1.3 (29.7)	4.7 (40.5)	10.4 (50.7)	9.1 (48.4)	−0.5 (31.1)	−6.5 (20.3)	−17.0 (1.4)	−21.9 (−7.4)	−22.6 (−8.7)
Average precipitation mm (inches)	3.4 (0.13)	6.2 (0.24)	10.4 (0.41)	29.2 (1.15)	31.0 (1.22)	43.0 (1.69)	102.7 (4.04)	102.1 (4.02)	61.8 (2.43)	35.4 (1.39)	12.7 (0.50)	3.3 (0.13)	441.2 (17.35)
Average precipitation days (≥ 0.1 mm)	2.4	3.0	3.8	5.9	6.6	8.5	11.4	10.4	8.5	6.5	3.7	1.9	72.6
Average snowy days	3.1	3.7	2.1	0.5	0	0	0	0	0	0.1	2.0	2.4	13.9
Average relative humidity (%)	52	50	46	47	49	57	70	75	73	66	60	53	58
Mean monthly sunshine hours	144.4	158.5	195.6	220.2	238.7	198.9	172.0	168.3	150.5	159.1	148.0	143.1	2,097.3
Percentage possible sunshine	47	51	52	55	54	45	39	41	41	46	49	48	47
Source: China Meteorological Administration

== Government ==
Jiexiu administers an area divided into five subdistricts, seven towns, and three townships:

Subdistricts
Name	Simp.	Trad.	Pinyin
Beiguan	北关街道	北關街道	Běiguān Jiēdào
Xiguan	西关街道	西關街道	Xīguān Jiēdào
Dongnan	东南街道	東南街道	Dōngnán Jiēdào
Xinan	西南街道		Xīnán Jiēdào
Beitan	北坛街道	北關街道	Běitán Jiēdào
Towns
Yi'an	义安镇	義安鎮	Yì'ān Zhèn
Zhanglan	张兰镇	張蘭鎮	Zhānglán Zhèn
Lianfu	连福镇	連福鎮	Liánfú Zhèn
Hongshan	洪山镇	洪山鎮	Hóngshān Zhèn
Longfeng	龙凤镇	龍鳳鎮	Lóngfèng Zhèn
Mianshan	绵山镇	綿山鎮	Miánshān Zhèn
Yitang	义棠镇	義棠鎮	Yìtáng Zhèn
Townships
Chengguan	城关乡	城關鄉	Chéngguān Xiāng
Songgu	宋古乡	宋古鄉	Sònggǔ Xiāng
Sanjia	三佳乡	三佳鄉	Sānjiā Xiāng

== Transport ==
- G5 Beijing–Kunming Expressway
- China National Highway 108
