= Bing Prefecture =

Historical administrative division in Shaanxi, China

- Traditional Chinese: 并州
- Simplified Chinese: 并州
Transcriptions
Standard Mandarin
- Hanyu Pinyin: Bīng Zhōu
- Wade–Giles: Ping^{1} Chou^{1}

Bingzhou or Bing Prefecture was a zhou (prefecture) in imperial China, centering on modern Taiyuan, Shanxi, China. It existed (intermittently) from the Tang dynasty until 723 and from 979 until 1059, when the Song dynasty renamed it Taiyuan Prefecture.

== History ==
=== Tang dynasty ===
During the Tang dynasty (618–907), Bing Prefecture covered only areas in present-day Shanxi, which included south of present-day Yangqu County, north of Wenshui County and east of midstream of the Fen River. In 723 Bing Prefecture was renamed to Taiyuan Prefecture.

=== Song dynasty ===
In 979 during the Song dynasty (960–1127), Bing Prefecture was restored and its capital set up in Yuci County (榆次縣; present-day Yuci District, Jinzhong, Shanxi). Three years later the capital was moved to Yangqu County (陽曲縣; present-day Yangqu County, Shanxi). In 1059 it was integrated into Taiyuan Prefecture.

== See also ==
- Taiyuan Prefecture
