= Huan Tan =

Chinese philosopher, poet, and politician (c. 43 BC - AD 28)

- Traditional Chinese: 桓譚
- Simplified Chinese: 桓谭
Transcriptions
Standard Mandarin
- Hanyu Pinyin: Huán Tán
- Wade–Giles: Huan T‘an

Master Huan
- Chinese: 桓子
Transcriptions
Standard Mandarin
- Hanyu Pinyin: Huánzǐ
- Wade–Giles: Huan-tzu

Junshan (courtesy name)
- Chinese: 君山
Transcriptions
Standard Mandarin
- Hanyu Pinyin: Jūnshān
- Wade–Giles: Chün-shan

Huan Tan (c. 43 BC – AD 28), courtesy name Junshan, was a Chinese philosopher, poet, and politician of the Western Han, Xin and Eastern Han dynasties.

== Life ==
Huan worked as an official under the administrations of Emperor Ai of Han (r. 27–1 BC), Wang Mang (r. AD 9–23), the Gengshi Emperor (r. 23–25), and Emperor Guangwu of Han (r. 25–57), respectively. Huan was a close associate of the court astronomer and mathematician Liu Xin, as well as the author and poet Yang Xiong.

== Works ==
In addition to his many rhapsodies, essays, and memorials, Huan's major work was the Xinlun (新论) or New Discussions, which was admired by Emperor Guangwu despite Huan Tan's besmirched reputation for having closely associated himself with the regime of the usurper Wang Mang. His Xinlun is also the earliest text to describe the trip hammer device powered by hydraulics (i.e., a waterwheel), which was used to pound and decorticate grain.

== Legacy ==
Huan's mode of philosophical thought belonged to an Old Text realist tradition. He drew explicitly on Legalism in his writings on government, saying that in certain historical epochs harsher punishments are needed. He was supported by other contemporaries such as the naturalist and mechanistic philosopher Wang Chong (27–c. 100), the latter who Crespigny states was probably heavily influenced by Huan Tan.

Huan Tan is reported by Yu Yingshi (1930–2021) to uphold self-contradictory views on immortality. On one hand, he is quoted to say that "the way of immortals" is a fabrication of the lovers for the strange; on the other, however, he was reported to admit the practice as genuine and efficient. Possible explanation lies in the fact that the Xinlun was a later compilation which might have confused his own statements with the quotations of his opponents.
