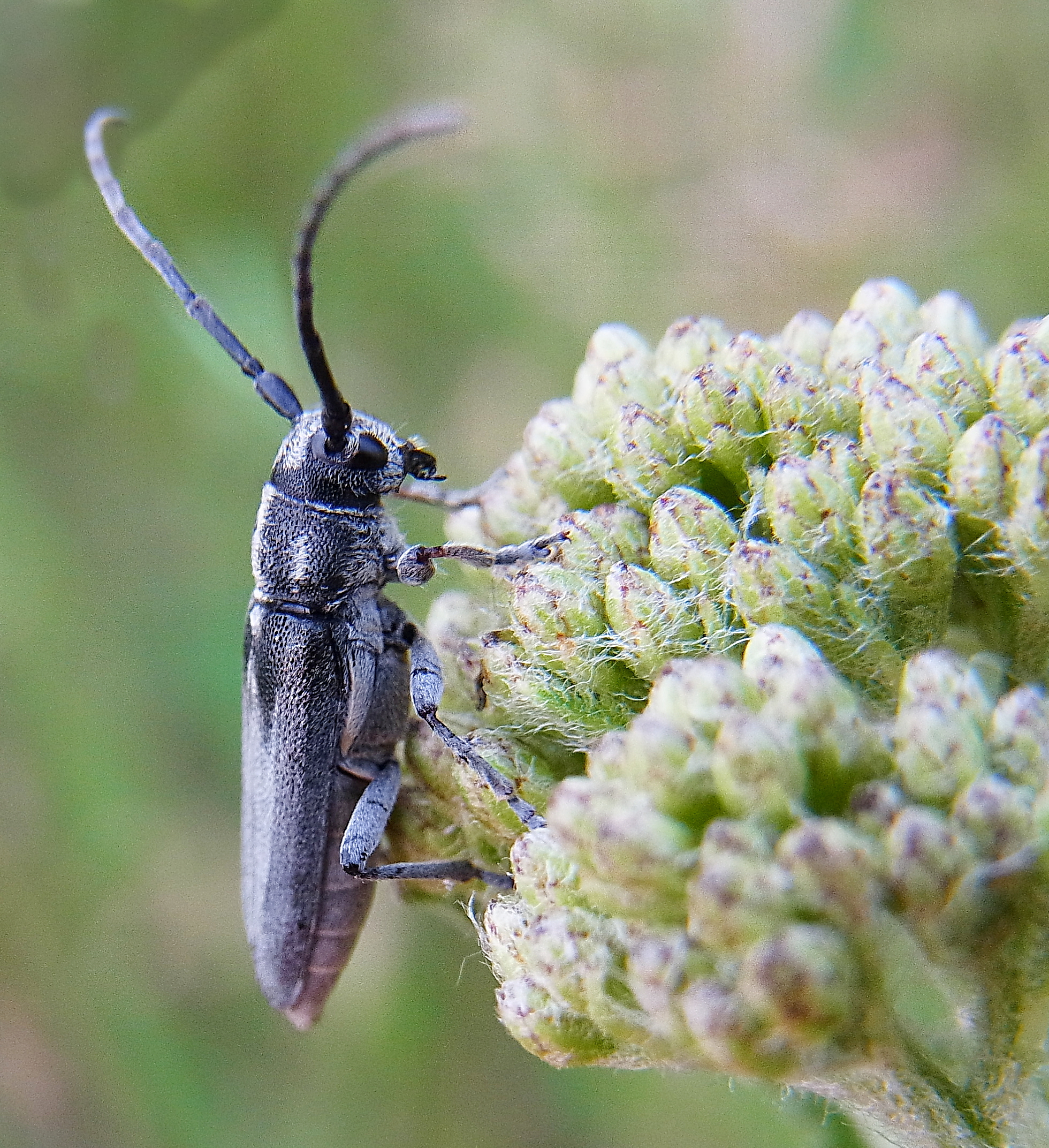

Scientific classification
- Kingdom: Animalia
- Phylum: Arthropoda
- Clade: Pancrustacea
- Class: Insecta
- Order: Coleoptera
- Suborder: Polyphaga
- Infraorder: Cucujiformia
- Family: Cerambycidae
- Genus: Phytoecia
- Species: P. nigricornis

Binomial name
- Phytoecia nigricornis (Fabricius, 1781)

Synonyms
- Saperda nigricornis Fabricius, 1781; Saperda canaliculata Fröhlich, 1793; Saperda suturalis Fabricius, 1792 nec 1787; Cerambyx melanocerus Gmelin, 1790

= Phytoecia nigricornis =

Species of beetle

Phytoecia nigricornis is a species of beetle in the family Cerambycidae. It was described by Johan Christian Fabricius in 1781, originally under the genus Saperda. It has a wide distribution throughout Europe. It measures between 8 and 13 mm (0.31 and 0.51 in). It feeds on Glebionis segetum, Solidago virgaurea, Artemisia campestris, Artemisia absinthium, Artemisia vulgaris, Artemisia sieversiana, Leucanthemum vulgare, and Tanacetum vulgare.

== Varietas ==
- Phytoecia nigricornis var. solidaginis Bach, 1856
- Phytoecia nigricornis var. julii Mulsant, 1863
