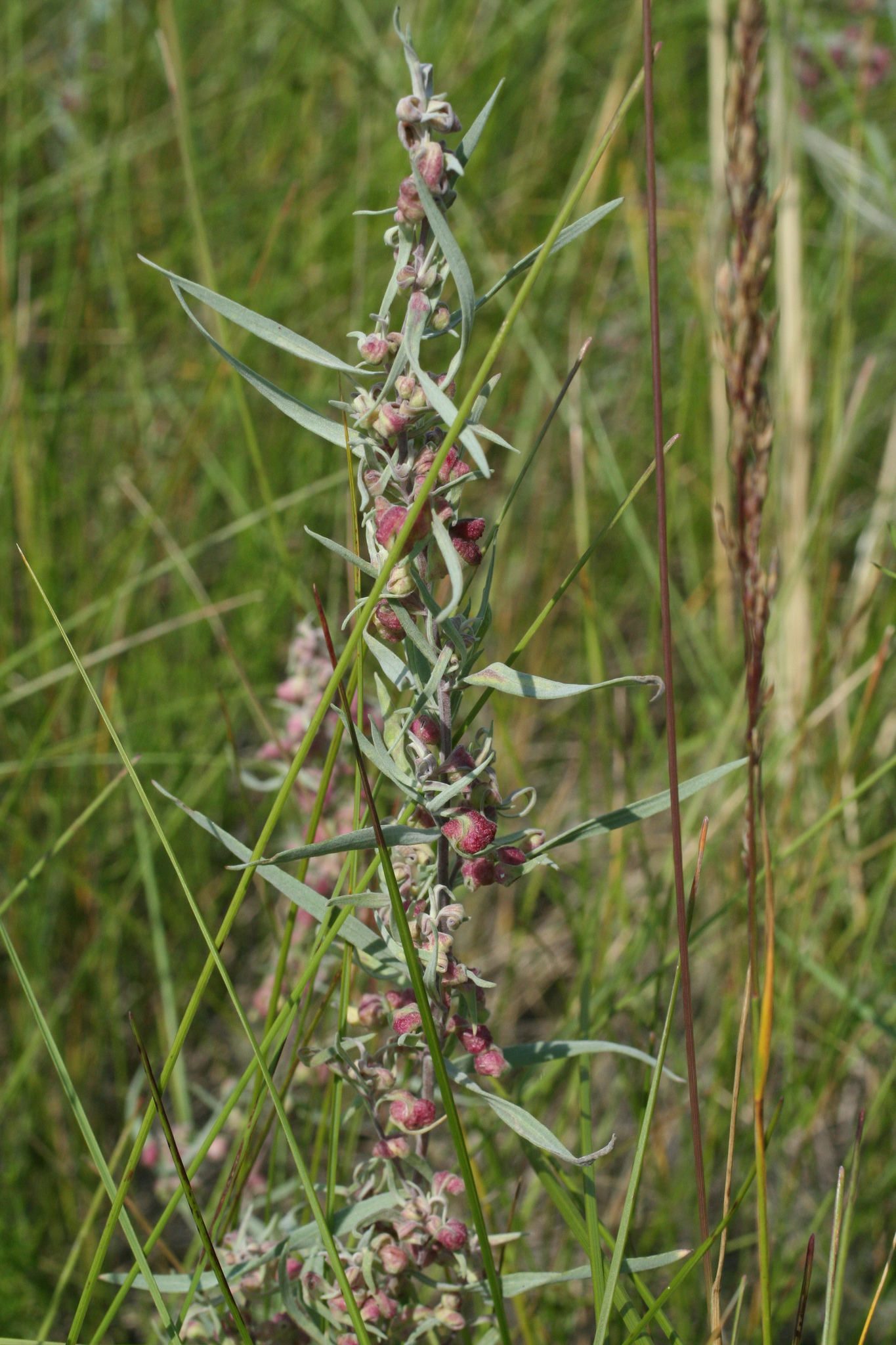

Scientific classification
- Kingdom: Plantae
- Clade: Tracheophytes
- Clade: Angiosperms
- Clade: Eudicots
- Clade: Asterids
- Order: Asterales
- Family: Asteraceae
- Genus: Artemisia
- Species: A. glauca

Binomial name
- Artemisia glauca Pall. ex Willd.

Synonyms
- Artemisia dracunculina S.Watson; Artemisia dracunculus subsp. dracunculina (S.Watson) H.M.Hall & Clem.; Artemisia dracunculus subsp. glauca (Pall. ex Willd.) H.M.Hall & Clem.; Artemisia gracillima Rydb.; Artemisia nutalliana Besser; Draconia glauca (Pall. ex Willd.) Soják; Oligosporus dracunculus subsp. dracunculinus (S.Watson) W.A.Weber; Oligosporus dracunculus subsp. glaucus (Pall. ex Willd.) Á.Löve & D.Löve; Oligosporus glaucus (Pall. ex Willd.) Poljakov

= Artemisia glauca =

Species of flowering plant

Artemisia glauca is a species of flowering plant in the family Asteraceae, native from eastern Europe to Mongolia and Western Himalaya. It was first described in 1831. Some sources regard it as the subspecies glauca of Artemisia dracunculus.
