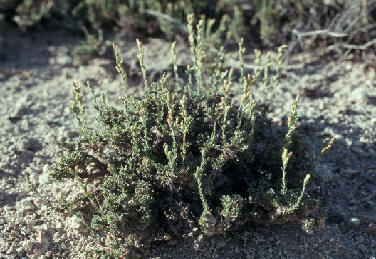

Conservation status
- Apparently Secure (NatureServe)

Scientific classification
- Kingdom: Plantae
- Clade: Tracheophytes
- Clade: Angiosperms
- Clade: Eudicots
- Clade: Asterids
- Order: Asterales
- Family: Asteraceae
- Genus: Artemisia
- Species: A. pygmaea

Binomial name
- Artemisia pygmaea A.Gray

Synonyms
- Seriphidium pygmaeum (A. Gray) W.A. Weber

= Artemisia pygmaea =

Species of flowering plant

Artemisia pygmaea is a North American species of sagebrush in the aster family known by the common name pygmy sagebrush.

== Description ==
Artemisia pygmaea is a small, cushion-like shrub growing up to about 20 centimeters (8 inches) in height. It is woody and grows from a taproot.

The small leaves are under a centimeter long and wide and are toothed or divided into several deep lobes.

The flower heads contain 3 to 5 disc florets but no ray florets. It is dioecious, with male and female flowers occurring on separate individual plants. Blooming occurs in August and September.

This is one of several plants parasitized by the parasitic plant Orobanche fasciculata.

== Distribution and habitat ==
Artemisia pygmaea is native to regions of the Southwestern United States, encompassing parts of Nevada, Utah, Colorado, Arizona, and New Mexico. It is uncommon throughout much of its range but it can be locally abundant.

Artemisia pygmaea grows in very dry habitat types. It occurs in the desert grasslands, pinyon-juniper woodlands, and playas of the American southwest, especially in the Great Basin and Uinta Basin. It favors calcareous soils such as gypsum, and alkali soils, salty soils, and clay. It tolerates substrates in which few other plants will grow. Its small size is an adaptation to its dry habitat.
