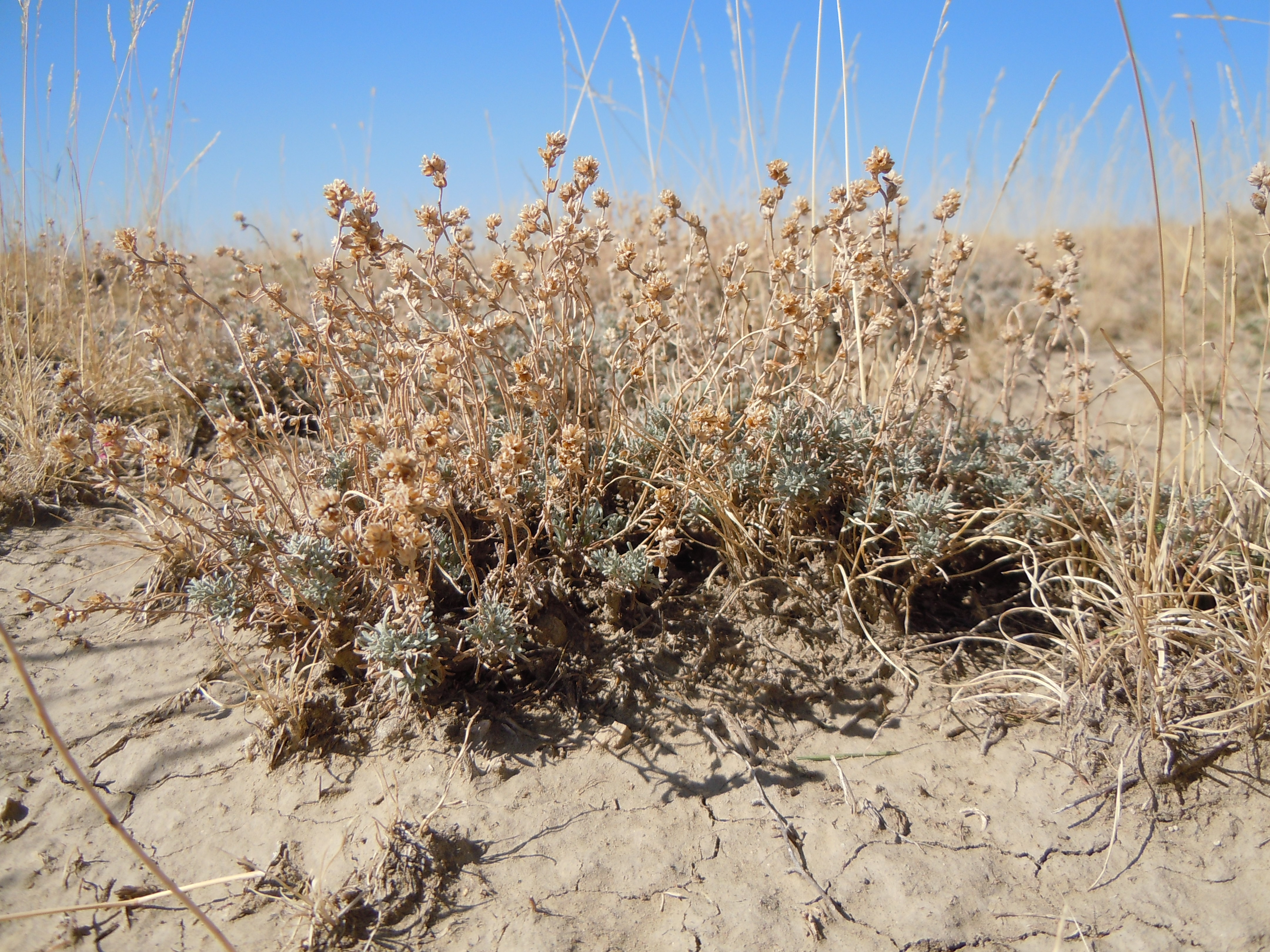

Conservation status
- Apparently Secure (NatureServe)

Scientific classification
- Kingdom: Plantae
- Clade: Tracheophytes
- Clade: Angiosperms
- Clade: Eudicots
- Clade: Asterids
- Order: Asterales
- Family: Asteraceae
- Genus: Artemisia
- Species: A. pedatifida

Binomial name
- Artemisia pedatifida Nutt.

Synonyms
- Oligosporus pedatifidus (Nutt.) Poljakov

= Artemisia pedatifida =

Species of flowering plant

Artemisia pedatifida is a species of flowering plant in the aster family known by the common names birdfoot sagebrush and matted sagewort. It is native to a section of the west-central United States encompassing parts of Idaho, Montana, Wyoming and Colorado, where it occurs on the high plains.

This plant is a perennial herb or small subshrub growing up to about 15 centimeters tall. There are several stems growing from a woody base atop a woody root. The small, gray-green leaves occur in a tuft around the woody base. The inflorescence contains a number of round flower heads which each have a few pistillate ray florets and a few disc florets. The plant reproduces by seed.

This sagebrush grows on grasslands and shrublands in mountains and on plains. It grows with many types of grasses and a few shrubs such as Gardner's saltbush (Atriplex gardneri) and winterfat (Krascheninnikovia lanata).
