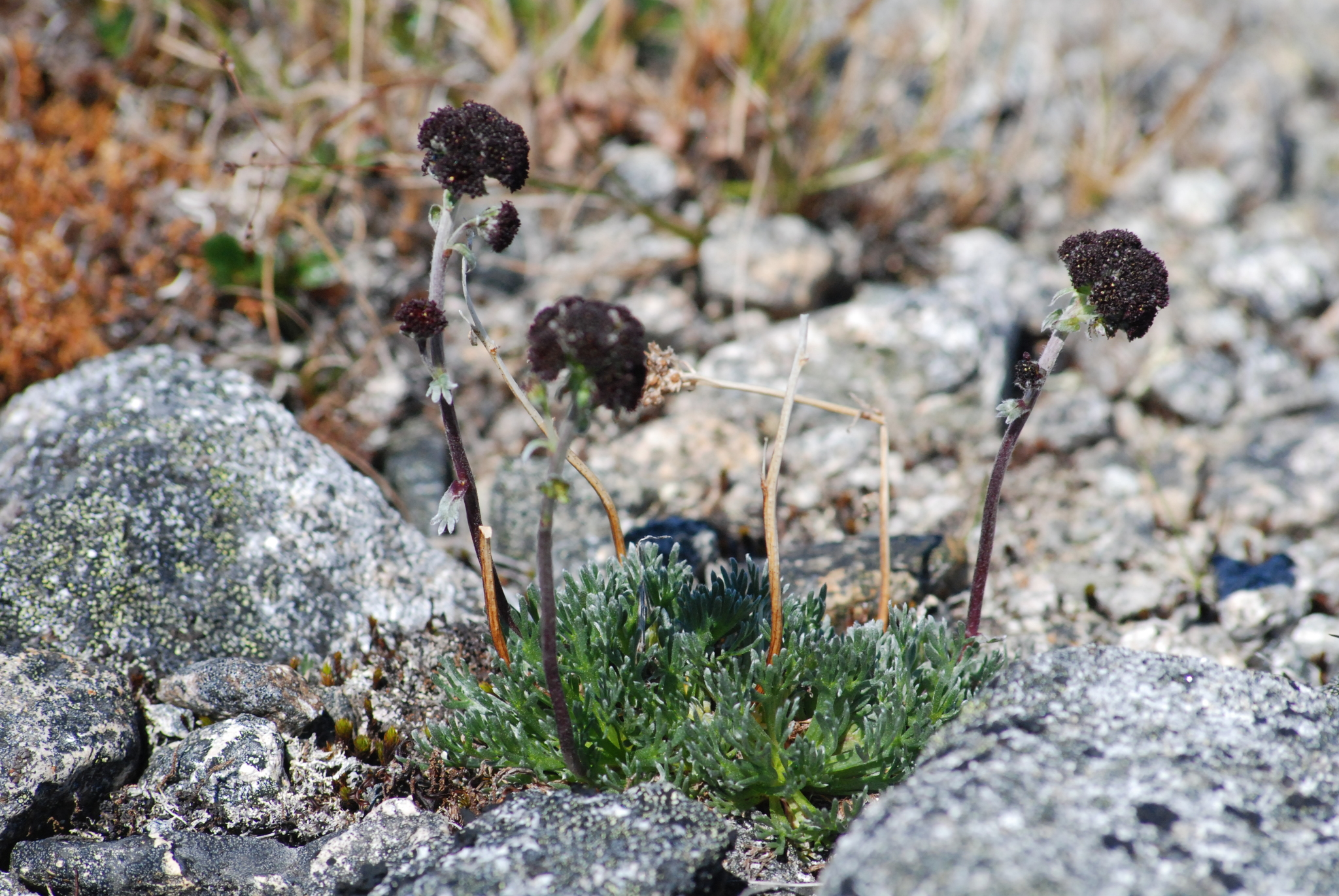

Scientific classification
- Kingdom: Plantae
- Clade: Tracheophytes
- Clade: Angiosperms
- Clade: Eudicots
- Clade: Asterids
- Order: Asterales
- Family: Asteraceae
- Genus: Artemisia
- Species: A. globularia

Binomial name
- Artemisia globularia Greene

Synonyms
- Ajania globularia (Cham. ex Besser) Poljakov; Artemisia flava Jurtzev; Artemisia globularia var. lutea (Hultén) Hultén; Artemisia norvegica subsp. globularia (Cham. ex Besser) H.M.Hall & Clem.

= Artemisia globularia =

Species of flowering plant

Artemisia globularia, the purple wormwood, is a rare Asian and North American species of plants in the family Asteraceae. It is native to Alaska, Yukon Territory, and the Chukotka Autonomous Okrug of Russia.

== Description ==
Artemisia globularia is a small, clumping perennial up to 30 cm (12 inches) tall. It is slightly aromatic and has many small, yellow flower heads. It grows in arctic and alpine tundra.

== Distribution and habitat ==
It grows on rocky slopes.
