= Artemisia aleutica =

Conservation status
- Critically Imperiled (NatureServe)

Scientific classification
- Kingdom: Plantae
- Clade: Tracheophytes
- Clade: Angiosperms
- Clade: Eudicots
- Clade: Asterids
- Order: Asterales
- Family: Asteraceae
- Genus: Artemisia
- Species: A. aleutica

Binomial name
- Artemisia aleutica Hultén

Species of flowering plant

Artemisia aleutica, the Aleutian wormwood, is a rare species of flowering plant endemic to Alaska. According to NatureServe, the species is Critically Imperiled and is known in only two locations in the Rat Island group.

== Description ==
Artemisia aleutica is a perennial herb that grows up to 4 in (10 cm) tall. It has basal leaves which are green to gray in color and obovate.

== Distribution and habitat ==
It is known only from the western Aleutian Islands, where it is limited to Kiska and Hawadax Islands in the Rat Island group. It grows in open fellfields on windswept and gravelly ridges.

== Conservation ==
NatureServe has given the species a global conservation status of Critically Imperiled (G1). Only two populations are known. It is threatened due to its small population size and high degree of natural disturbance.
