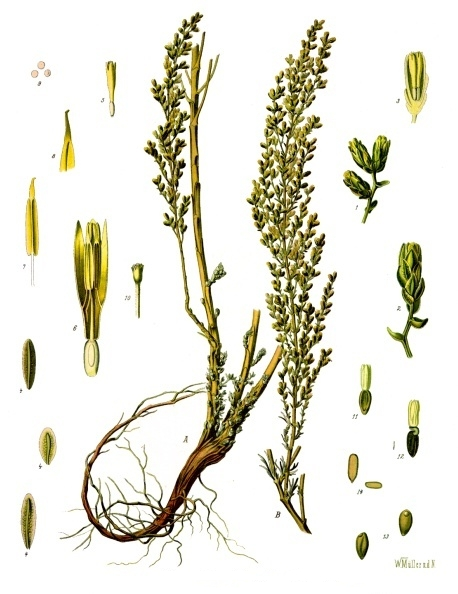
- Artemisia cina (Levant wormseed)

Scientific classification
- Kingdom: Plantae
- Clade: Tracheophytes
- Clade: Angiosperms
- Clade: Eudicots
- Clade: Asterids
- Order: Asterales
- Family: Asteraceae
- Subfamily: Asteroideae
- Tribe: Anthemideae
- Genus: Artemisia; L.

Type species
- Artemisia vulgaris L.

Synonyms
- Absinthium Mill.; Chamartemisia Rydb.; Oligosporus Cass.; Artemisiastrum Rydb.; Artanacetum (Rzazade) Rzazade; Abrotanum Mill.; Draconia Heist. ex Fabr.; Artemisia subg. Seriphidium Less.; Hydrophytum Eschw.; Seriphidium (Besser ex Less.) Fourr.; Dracunculus Ruppr. ex Ledeb. 1845, illegitimate homonym, not Dracunculus Mill. 1754 (Araceae)

= Artemisia (plant) =

Genus of flowering plants

Artemisia (/ˌɑːrtəˈmiːziə/ art-ə-MEE-zee-ə) is a large, diverse genus of plants belonging to the daisy family, Asteraceae, with almost 500 species. Common names for various species in the genus include mugwort, wormwood, and sagebrush.

Some botanists split the genus into several genera, but DNA analysis does not support the maintenance of the genera Crossostephium, Filifolium, Neopallasia, Seriphidium, and Sphaeromeria; three other segregate genera—Stilnolepis, Elachanthemum, and Kaschgaria—are maintained by this evidence. Occasionally, some of the species are called sages, causing confusion with the Salvia sages in the family Lamiaceae.

Artemisia comprises hardy herbaceous plants and shrubs, which are known for the powerful chemical constituents in their essential oils. Artemisia species grow in temperate climates of both hemispheres, usually in dry or semiarid habitats. Notable species include A. vulgaris (common mugwort), A. tridentata (big sagebrush), A. annua (sagewort), A. absinthium (wormwood), A. dracunculus (tarragon), A. abrotanum (southernwood), and A. herba-alba (white wormwood). The leaves of many species are covered with white hairs.

Most species have strong aromas and bitter tastes from terpenoids and sesquiterpene lactones, which discourage herbivory, and may have had a selective advantage. The small flowers are wind-pollinated. Artemisia species are used as food plants by the larvae of a number of Lepidoptera species.

== Taxonomy ==
The genus was erected by Carl Linnaeus in 1753. The name Artemisia derives from the Greek goddess Artemis (Roman Diana), the namesake of Greek Queens Artemisia I and II. A more specific reference may be to Artemisia II of Caria, a botanist and medical researcher (also a queen and naval commander), who died in 350 BC.

=== Classification ===
Classification of Artemisia is difficult. Divisions of Artemisia prior to 2000 into subgenera or sections have not been backed up by molecular data, but much of the molecular data, as of 2006, are not especially strong. The following identified groups do not include all the species in the genus.

==== Subgenera Artemisia and Absinthium ====
Subgenera Artemisia and Absinthium are sometimes, but not always, considered the same. Subgenus Artemisia (originally Abrotanum Besser) is characterized by a heterogamous flower head with female outer florets and hermaphrodite central florets, and a fertile, glabrous receptacle. Absinthium DC, though sometimes merged with subgenus Artemisia is characterized by heterogamous flower head with female outer florets and hermaphrodite central florets, and a fertile, hairy receptacle. Generally, previously proposed monotypic and non-monophyletic subgenera have been merged with the subgenus Artemesia due to molecular evidence. For example, in 2011 using ribosomal DNA analysis of their own and a review of molecular data (such as ITS sequence analysis) of others, S. Garcia and colleagues argued that it was logical to rename several Sphaeromeria and Picrothamnus (formerly designated sister genera to Artemisia) species as Artemisia, as well as to revert some Sphaeromeria species back to Artemisia, where they had been categorized previously. Part of this was due to research by Watson and colleagues, who found that the four subgenera were not monophyletic except for Dracunculus, after analyzing and matching the internal transcribed spacers of nuclear ribosomal DNA from many Seriphidium and Artemisia species, and the related genera Arctanthemum and Dendranthema. The authors concluded that inflorescence morphology is not alone reliable for categorizing the genus or some subgenera, as qualities that previously demarcated them (such as homogamous, discoid, ray-less inflorescences) seemed to have undergone paralleled evolution up to seven times. Picrothamnus Nutt. ("bud sage"), now considered Artemisia spinescens and Sphaeromeria Nutt. ("chicken sage") are some examples, both endemic to North America.

==== Tridentatae ====
Section Tridentatae consists of eleven to thirteen species of coarse shrubs often known colloquially as "sagebrushes", which are very prominent parts of the flora in western North America. In some classifications, they have previously been considered part of the genus or subgenus Seriphidium, although recent studies have contested this lineage to Old World species. Tridentatae was first articulated as a section by Rydberg in 1916, and it was not until McArthur et al. in 1981 that Tridentatae was elevated to a separate subgenus from Seriphidium. The principal motive for their separation was geographical distribution, chemical makeup, and karyotype. Much of the debate surrounding Tridentatae is phytogeographic, thus habitat and geography are frequently cited when understanding the evolution of this endemic North American subgenus. Evolutionary cycles of wet and dry climates encouraged "diploid and polyploid races which are morphologically similar if not indistinguishable" (McArthur 598).

Autopolyploidy among plants is not uncommon, however Tridentatae exhibits a remarkable amount of chromosomal differences at the population level, rather than the taxon level. This contributes to the difficulty in determining Tridentatae's phylogeny. The subgenus' relative homogeneity within ploidies has enabled it to habitually hybridize and backcross, resulting in a high degree of genetic variation at the population level rather than the taxon level. For instance, some articles suggest that to be monophyletic, section Tridentatae should exclude Artemisia bigelovii and A. palmeri. and include A. pygmaea and A. rigida. These results were supported by extensive chloroplast DNA (cpDNA) and nrDNA sequencing which departed from prior morphological, anatomical, and behavioral data.

Traditional lineages within Tridentatae were proposed on the basis of leaf morphology, habitat preference, and the ability to leaf-sprout, among other morphological and behavioral characteristics. For instance, sagebrush in the A. tridentata lineage have tridentate leaves, live in especially arid habitats, and are unable to root-sprout. This method of delimitation is problematic for species that do not fully adhere to the characteristics of a given lineage. The dry habitat and the presence of interxylary cork has often made the case for Tridentatae as a subgenus of its own, and there is some ribosomal molecular evidence of a "Tridentatae core" group for the subgenus. In 2011, Garcia and colleagues proposed enlarging Tridentatae and organized it into the sections Tridentatae, Nebulosae, and Filifoliae based on previous research establishing relationships via ribosomal and nuclear DNA.

Intergrading forms are particularly common in recently radiated subgenera such as Tridentatae, given their frequent reversals and convergent evolution. Global reviews of Artemisia using ITS analysis support the hypothesis that Tridentatae has independent origins from Old World Seriphidium These findings were compared with capitula morphology, challenging past assumptions based on floral characteristics. To better understand the rapid diversification and radiation relative to Old World Artemisia, a closer study of Beriginian or Arctic species may provide missing links.

- Artemisia tridentata
- Artemisia cana
- Artemisia nova
- Artemisia rigida
- Artemisia arbuscula
- Artemisia longiloba
- Artemisia tripartita
- Artemisia pygmaea
- Artemisia rothrockii

Section Tridentatae includes above species with the exception of A. longiloba, which is treated as a subspecies of A. arbuscula. Section Nebulae includes A. californica, A. nesiotica, and A. filifolia.

==== Seriphidium ====
The Old World species which different classifications put into the genus or subgenus Seriphidium consist of about 125 species native to Europe and temperate Asia, with the largest number of species in Central Asia. Some classifications, such as that of the Flora of North America, exclude any New World plants from Seriphidium. They are herbaceous plants or small shrubs.

Seriphidium Besser was morphologically categorized by a homogamous flower head with all hermaphrodite florets and fertile and glabrous receptacle. Tridentatae was originally categorized as within Seriphidium due to floral, inflorescence, and leaf morphological similarities, until McArthur et al.'s analysis in 1981, which explained these similarities as convergent evolution. Old World Seriphidium, with 125 species native to Europe and temperate Asia, was a previous classification of Seriphidium. North American or "New World" Seriphidium and Old World Seriphidium. North American Seriphidium were later placed into Tridentatae Rydb due to geographical distribution, growth habit, and karyotypic and chemotaxonomic similarities (such as presence of certain terpenols).

==== Subgenus Dracunculus ====
One group which is well-supported by molecular data is subgenus Dracunculus. It consists of 80 species found in both North America and Eurasia, of which the best-known is perhaps Artemisia dracunculus, the spice tarragon.

Dracunculus Besser. has historically been characterized morphologically by a heterogamous flower head with female outer florets and hermaphrodite central florets, but with a female-sterile, glabrous receptacle. Dracunculus is the most supported and resolved subgenus of Artemisia, which includes Artemisia dracunculus L., known as the cooking spice tarragon. Chloroplast and ribosomal DNA sequence analysis in 2011 supported monophyly with two clades, one of which includes some North American endemic species as well as most species of Europe and Asia, while the second clade includes just A. salsoloides and A. tanaitica, found in Eastern Europe and Siberia to the Western Himalayas. This study places Dracunculus as one of the more recent subgenera within Artemisia, situating A. salisoides more basally on the tree, with North American endemic groups such as the sagebrushes having derived on the other end of a split from a common ancestor with Dracunculus. Formerly proposed genera Mausolea, Neopallasia and Turaniphytum are now argued to be within the subgenus Dracunculus due to ribosomal and chloroplast DNA evidence, with further species resolved as sister groups to Dracunculus due to phytochemical relationships.

=== Species ===
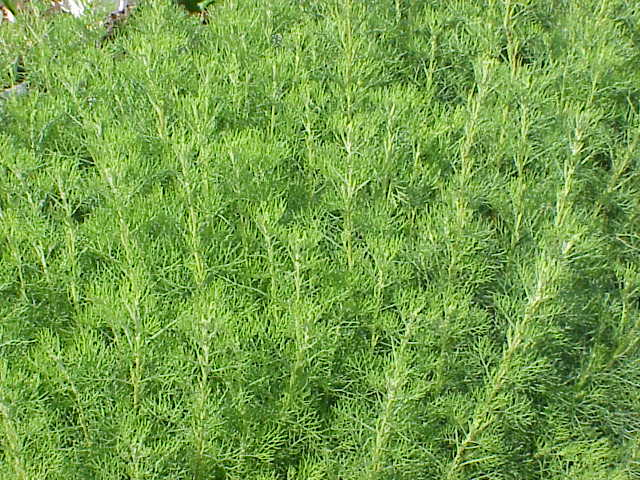
Artemisia abrotanum

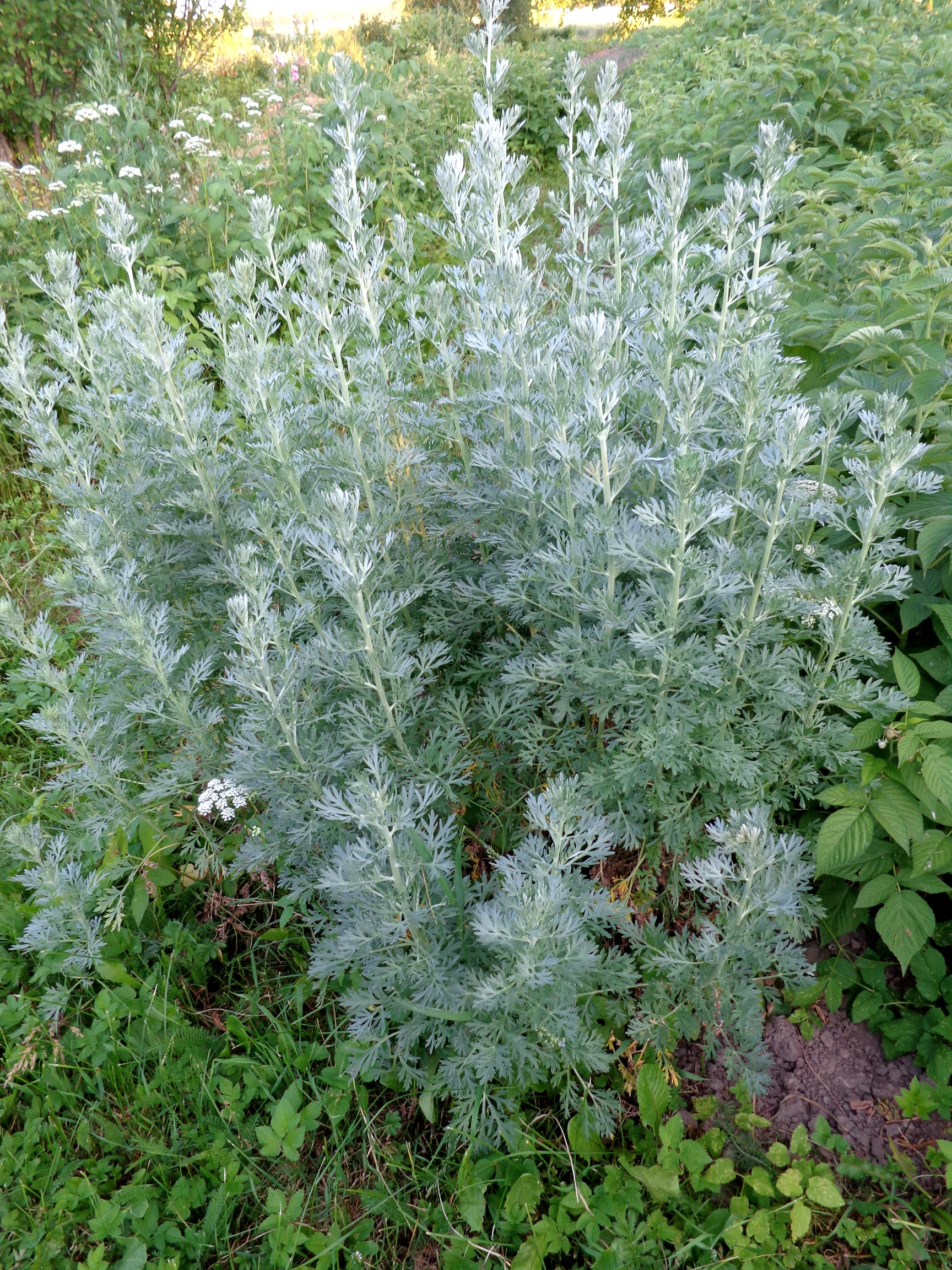
Artemisia absinthium

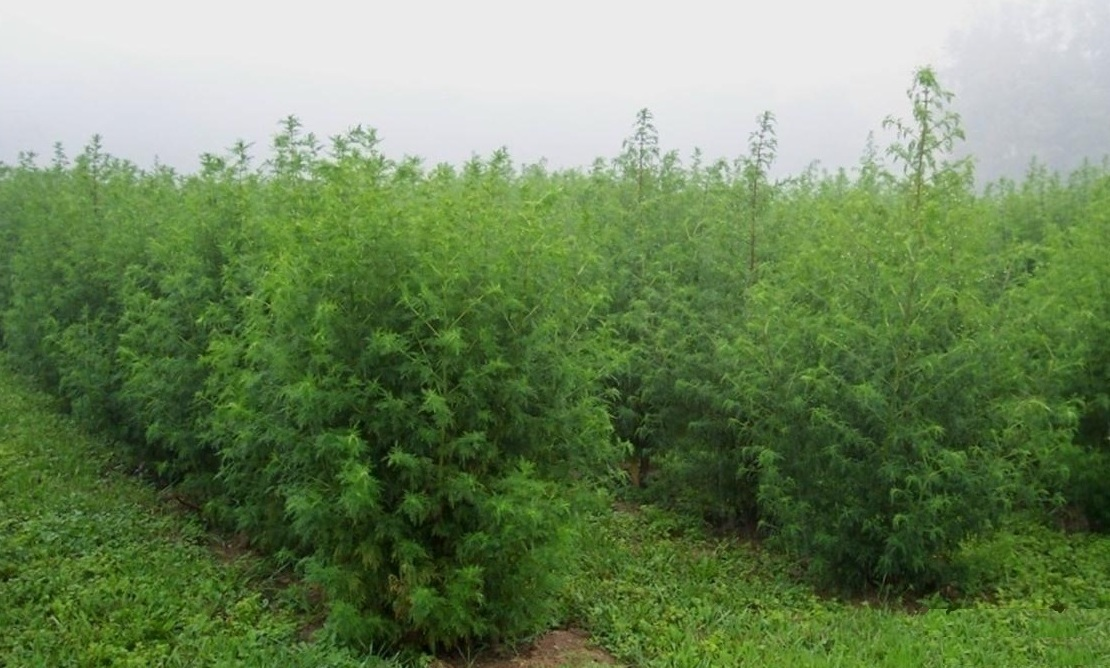
Artemisia annua

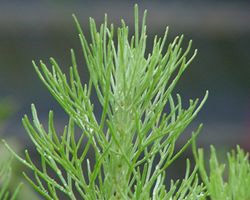
Artemisia californica (California sagebrush) leaves

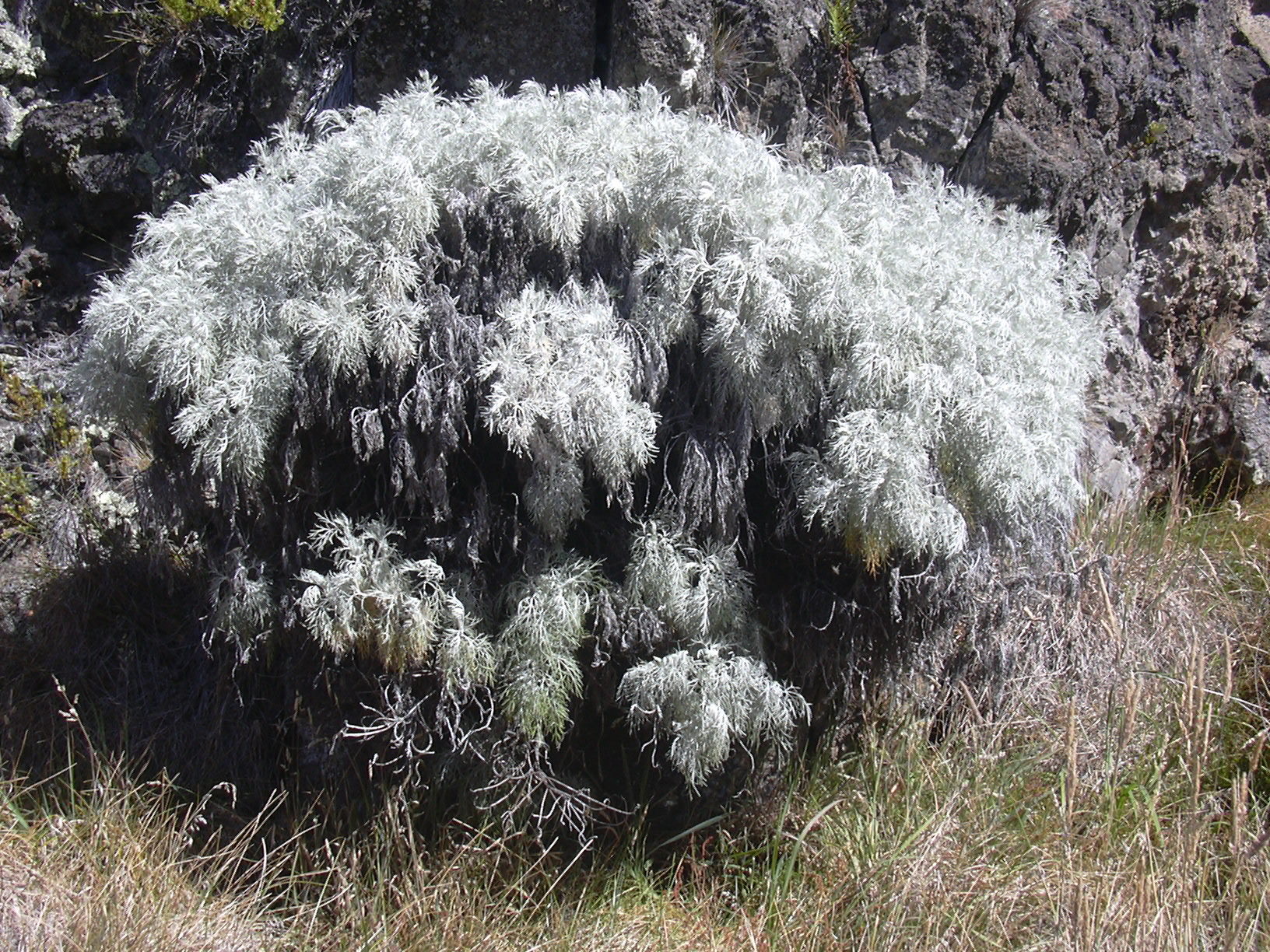
Artemisia mauiensis (Maui wormwood)

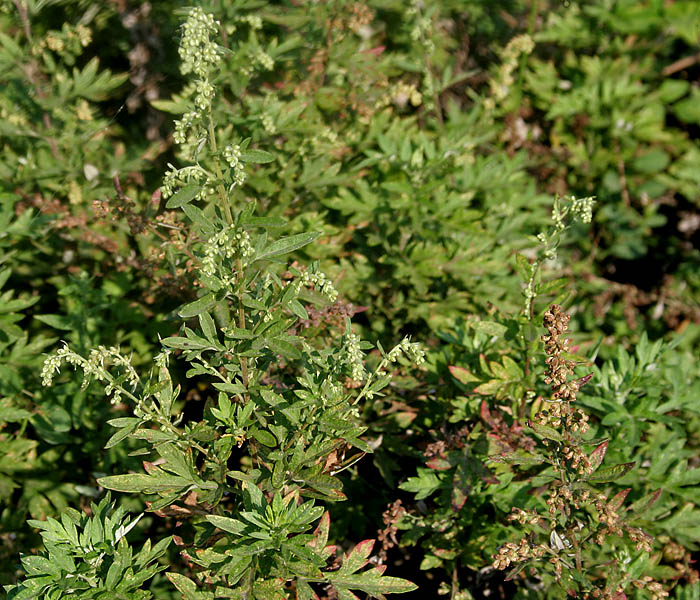
Artemisia nilagirica (Nilagiri wormwood)

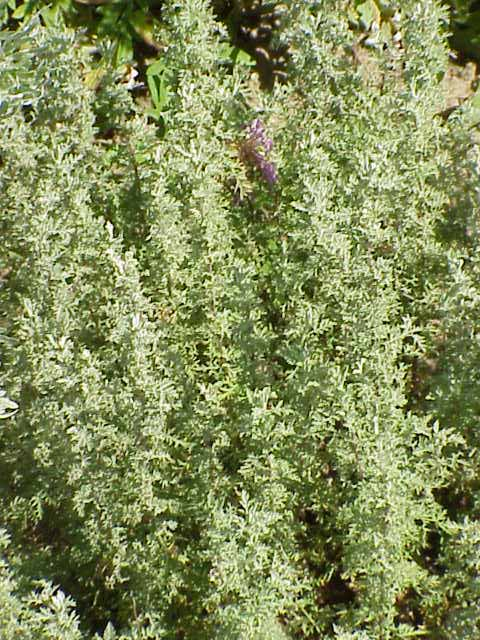
Artemisia pontica (Roman wormwood)

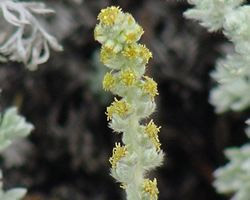
Artemisia pycnocephala (beach sagewort) flowers

As of June 2024, Plants of the World Online accepted almost 500 species. Below are named some of the most notable Artemisia species:

- Artemisia abrotanum L. – southernwood, southern wormwood, slovenwood, abrotanum, old-man, lad's love
- Artemisia absinthium L. – grand wormwood, absinthium
- Artemisia afra Jacq. ex Willd. – African wormwood, African sagebrush
- Artemisia alba Turra – camphor southernwood
- Artemisia aleutica Hultén – Aleutian wormwood
- Artemisia annua L. – annual wormwood, sweet sagewort, sweet Annie
- Artemisia arborescens L. – tree wormwood
- Artemisia arbuscula Nutt. – little sagebrush, low Sagebrush, black sage
- Artemisia arenaria DC.
- Artemisia argyi H.Lév. & Vaniot – Chinese mugwort
- Artemisia austriaca Jacq.
- Artemisia bhutanica Grierson & Spring.
- Artemisia biennis Willd. – biennial sagewort, biennial wormwood
- Artemisia bigelovii A.Gray – Bigelow sage, Bigelow sagebrush
- Artemisia caerulescens L.
- Artemisia californica Less. – coastal sagebrush, California sagebrush
- Artemisia campestris L. – field wormwood, sand wormwood
- Artemisia cana Pursh – silver sagebrush
- Artemisia capillaris Thunb. – capillary wormwood, yin-chen wormwood
- Artemisia carruthii Wood ex Carruth. – Carruth sagewort, Carruth's sagebrush
- Artemisia chamaemelifolia Vill.
- Artemisia cina O.Berg & C.F.Schmidt – santonica, Levant wormseed
- Artemisia douglasiana Bess. – Douglas' mugwort, Douglas' sagewort, northwest mugwort
- Artemisia dracunculus L. – tarragon, silky wormwood
- Artemisia filifolia Torr. – sand sagebrush, sand-sage, silvery wormwood
- Artemisia franserioides Greene – ragweed sagebrush
- Artemisia frigida Willd. – fringed sagebrush, fringed-sage, prairie sagewort, estafiata
- Artemisia furcata Bieb. – forked wormwood
- Artemisia glacialis L. – glacier wormwood, alpine mugwort
- Artemisia glauca Pall. ex Willd.
- Artemisia globularia Cham. ex Bess. – purple wormwood
- Artemisia gmelinii Webb ex Stechmann – Gmelin's wormwood, Russian wormwood
- Artemisia gorgonum Webb
- Artemisia herba-alba Asso – white wormwood
- Artemisia inculta Delile
- Artemisia indica Willd. – Indian wormwood
- Artemisia integrifolia L.
- Artemisia japonica Thunb. – otoko yomogi
- Artemisia laciniata Willd. – Siberian wormwood
- Artemisia lactiflora Wall. ex DC. – white mugwort
- Artemisia longifolia Nutt. – longleaf sagebrush, longleaf wormwood
- Artemisia ludoviciana Nutt. – gray sagewort, prairie sage, white sagebrush, Louisiana-sage, western-sage
- Artemisia maritima L. – sea wormwood, absinthe de mer
- Artemisia marschalliana Spreng.
- Artemisia michauxiana Bess. – Michaux sagebrush, Michaux's wormwood, lemon sagewort
- Artemisia nesiotica Raven – island sagebrush
- Artemisia norvegica Fr. – Norwegian mugwort, alpine sagewort
- Artemisia nova A.Nels. – black sagebrush, small sagebrush
- Artemisia olchonensis Leonova
- Artemisia orientalixizangensis Y.R.Ling & Humphries
- Artemisia packardiae J.Grimes & Ertter – Packard's wormwood, Succor Creek sagebrush
- Artemisia pallens Wall
- Artemisia palmeri A.Gray – San Diego sagewort
- Artemisia papposa S.F.Blake & Cronq. – Owyhee sage, Owyhee sagebrush
- Artemisia pedatifida Nutt. – birdfoot sagebrush, matted sagewort
- Artemisia pontica L. – Roman wormwood, green-ginger
- Artemisia porteri Cronq. – Porter's wormwood, Porter mugwort
- Artemisia princeps Pamp. – Japanese mugwort, yomogi
- Artemisia pycnocephala (Less.) DC. – beach wormwood, coastal sagewort
- Artemisia pygmaea A.Gray – pygmy sagebrush
- Artemisia rigida (Nutt.) A.Gray – scabland sagebrush
- Artemisia rothrockii A.Gray – timberline sagebrush
- Artemisia rupestris L. – rock wormwood
- Artemisia schmidtiana Maxim. – angel's hair
- Artemisia scoparia Waldst. & Kit. – redstem wormwood, yin-chen wormwood
- Artemisia senjavinensis Bess. – arctic wormwood
- Artemisia serrata Nutt. – sawtooth wormwood
- Artemisia sieversiana Willd. – sieversian wormwood
- Artemisia spiciformis K.Koch
- Artemisia spinescens D.C.Eaton – budsage [syn. Picrothamnus desertorum]
- Artemisia stelleriana Bess. – hoary mugwort, oldwoman, Dusty Miller, beach wormwood
- Artemisia suksdorfii Piper – coastal wormwood, Suksdorf sagewort
- Artemisia thuscula Cav.
- Artemisia tilesii Ledeb. – Tilesius' wormwood, Aleutian mugwort
- Artemisia tridentata Nutt. – big sagebrush, blue sage, black sage, basin sagebrush, common sagebrush
- Artemisia tripartita Rydb. – threetip sagebrush
- Artemisia umbelliformis Lam. – Alps wormwood, alpine wormwood
- Artemisia verlotiorum Lamotte – Chinese wormwood
- Artemisia viridis Willd. ex DC.
- Artemisia vulgaris L. – mugwort, felonherb, green-ginger, common wormwood

=== Formerly placed here ===
- Centipeda minima (L.) A.Braun & Asch. (as A. minima L.)
- Eupatorium capillifolium (Lam.) Small (as A. capillifolia Lam.)
- Filifolium sibiricum (L.) Kitam. (as A. sibirica (L.) Maxim.)
- Grangea maderaspatana (L.) Poir. (as A. maderaspatana L.)
- Matricaria discoidea DC. (as A. matricarioides auct.)

== Ecology ==
Artemisia species are found on every continent except Antarctica, and have become part of many ecosystems around the world as a result. Below is currently a partial view of the importance of Artemisia species in ecosystems around the world.

=== North America ===
In North America, several species of Artemisia have become important parts of local environments, with wide adaptability. Artemisia papposa described by S.F.Blake & Arthur Cronquist can grow in the harsh, dry expanses of alkali flats, but also adapts to meadowlands.

Sagebrushes like A. papposa (of the Tridenteae subgenus) in general are found in the north and southwest areas of the North American continent. In the Intermountain West, in a habitat known as Sagebrush Steppe, A. tridentata, A. tripartite, and A. arbuscula grow alongside various grasses and species of bitter bush, creating an important environment for mule deer, pygmy rabbits, antelopes, and the sage grouse. Understanding the phylogenetic relationships among the sagebrushes has been helpful in understanding the relationships among these plants and their environments, as well as learning more about how these plants formed these communities over long stretches of time. Sagebrushes, which include A. ludoviciana and A. tridentata among others, can often also be found growing near junipers, particularly in the Elkhorn Mountain region, where the Juniper Woodlands form an ecosystem which provide cover for many animal species in both summer and winter months and storms. Because the habitat should burn only every 400–600 years, with sagebrush shrubs living as long as 200 years (though potentially typically 88), this particular combination of Artemisia with other flora form an enduring habitat. As it often goes, however, governments and farming businesses have often cleared sagebrush-juniper communities to create land for cow and domestic animal feedcrops, and Artemisia species may be declining due to this and invasive species such as cheatgrass. Destabilization of the vegetation creates higher risk of fires, causing concern among the local conservation and wildlife groups.

Due to their often extensive rhizome systems and other potential characteristics, however, some Artemisia species are often resilient to mowing or pulling, giving some species of Artemisia the ability to easily become invasive if introduced to comfortable, though non-native habitats.

- A. annua (native to Eurasia) is found in wetland habitats, and though it has been naturalized in much of North America it is considered weedy or invasive by some localities, such as Kentucky.
- This is particularly true of Artemisia vulgaris, known as "common mugwort", in North America, where it was introduced by European colonists and settlers in the 1600s, when Jesuit priests and other colonizers may have first brought the herb for ointments and teas and likely also let into port cities via ballast dumping. Artemisia vulgaris will grow in dense groups and out-compete other plants in an area, in part due to its ability to grow on poorly enriched soils. Disturbed habitats, cities and roadsides or parking lots can easily become a field of A. vulgaris, which is the Artemisia species designated as invasive by New York State.

== Cultivation and uses ==
=== Historical uses ===
Historically, Artemisia species were used in the attempted cure of various medical ailments, particularly related to women's health. In the Middle Ages, Artemisia sp. were regarded as herbs of significant medical power, and described as "the most important master against all exhaustions". By the Renaissance, Artemisia sp. (particularly A. absinthium) was used particularly in the cure of digestive ailments, though the use of species such as A. vulgaris in women's health still persisted.

==== Women's medicine ====
Artemisia species (likely A. vulgaris and A. latifolia) were described by the Greco-Roman physician Dioscorides (c. 40–90 AD) in his De materia medica as being used for "driving out the menstrual flow" and as an "abortifacient". Historian John Scarborough (1940-2022) argued that Dioscorides' discussion of Artemisia sp. was an adaptation of folklore medicine that was commonly used in Asia Minor and Thrace. Learned medicine in the Middle Ages was largely based on humoral theory, which ascribed certain properties to herbs based on their use in heating/cooling and wetting/drying the body. A. vulgaris was described by the second century physician Galen (c. 129–216 AD) as having warming and drying effects, which recommended it to the treatment of urological diseases. The continued use of Artemisia as an abortifacient was described by twelfth-century women's health texts in the Trotula. This use was further integrated into university teaching by Johannes II Platearius (active 1120–1150) at the medical school of Salerno, who proscribed a "wine of the decoction of artemisia" as a cure to blocked menstrual flow.

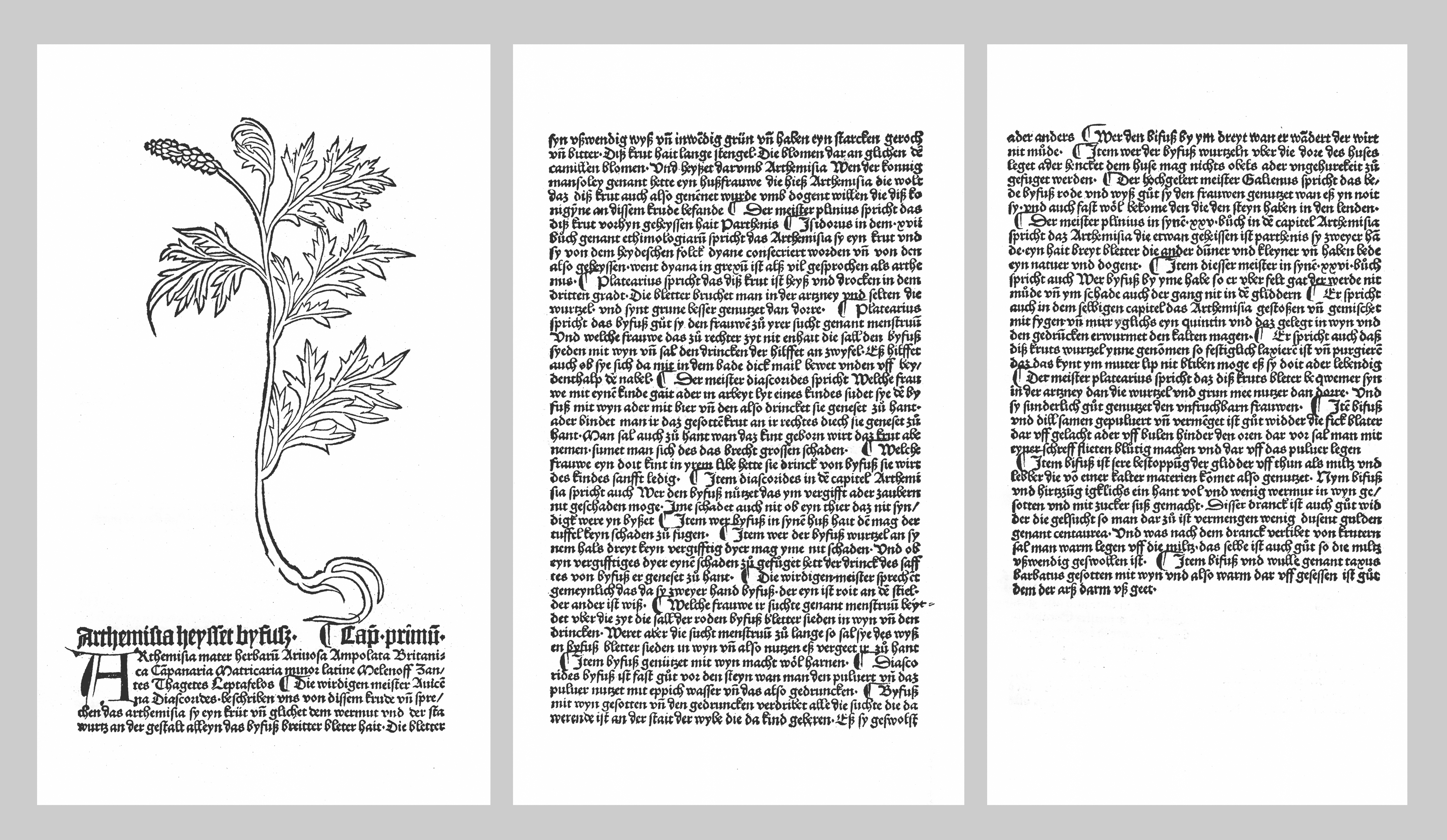
Gart Artemisia Text

Artemisia sp. continued to be used in women's health into the 16th century, and was described by Johann Wonnecke von Kaub in Gart der Gesundheit as the "mother herb", for use in "women's sickness". This continued in the English medical tradition as well, with mugwort (likely A. vulgaris) being described as a "an herb appropriated to the female sex" for use in "bringing down the menses" by the English physician Nicholas Culpeper's 1653 Complete Herbal.

==== Historical medicinal uses ====
In Anglo-Saxon medicine, Artemisia vulgaris (mugwort) and A. pontica were described as treatments for soreness, pains and aches. A. vulgaris and A. absinthium were used to repel midges (Old English mucgwyrt seems to be derived from mycg 'midge'), fleas and moths, intestinal worms, and in brewing (mugwort beer, mugwort wine) as a remedy against hangovers and nightmares.

Artemisia absinthium (known as wormwood or absinth) was used as a speculative plague cure during the Black Death as an antipyretic and antipasmodic, along with being reported to aid in wound healing.

=== Modern uses ===
The aromatic leaves of some species are used for flavouring. Most species have an extremely bitter taste. A. dracunculus (tarragon) is widely used as a culinary herb, particularly important in French cuisine.

Artemisia absinthium is used to make the highly potent spirit absinthe. Malört also contains wormwood. The aperitif vermouth is a wine flavored with aromatic herbs, but originally with wormwood.

Artemisia arborescens (tree wormwood, or sheeba in Arabic) is an aromatic herb indigenous to the Middle East used in tea, usually with mint.

A few species are grown as ornamental plants, the fine-textured ones used for clipped bordering. All grow best in free-draining sandy soil, unfertilized, and in full sun.

The largest collection of living Artemisia species, subspecies and cultivars is held in the National Collection of Artemisia in Sidmouth, Devon, UK, which holds about 400 taxa. The National Collection scheme is administered by Plant Heritage (formerly National Council for Conservation of Plants and Gardens, NCCPG) in the British Isles.

=== Medicinal uses ===
Artemisinin (from Artemisia annua) and derivatives are a group of compounds used to treat malaria. Treatments containing an artemisinin derivative (artemisinin-combination therapies) are now standard treatment worldwide for malaria caused by Plasmodium falciparum. Administering Artemisia annua as dried whole leaves may cause resistance to develop more slowly than if it is administered as pure artemisinin.

Tu Youyou received the 2015 Nobel Prize in Physiology or Medicine for her discovery of the semisynthetic derivatives. She conducted research on traditional Chinese medicine and potential contributions to cures for malaria, on the basis of folk medicine and ancient Chinese texts. From reviewing ancient Chinese texts, they found that the compound artemisinin was optimally extracted at lower temperatures, as high temperature water poured over sweet wormwood leaves destroyed essential treatment properties.

The World Health Organization does not support the promotion or use of Artemisia plant material in any form for the prevention or treatment of malaria. They note that the plant form of medication has several problems. These include a lack of consistent artemisinin content, the content being low enough that recurrence of malaria often occurs, that the use of the plant may contribute to widespread artemisinin resistance, and that the plant form is not effective in malaria prevention.
