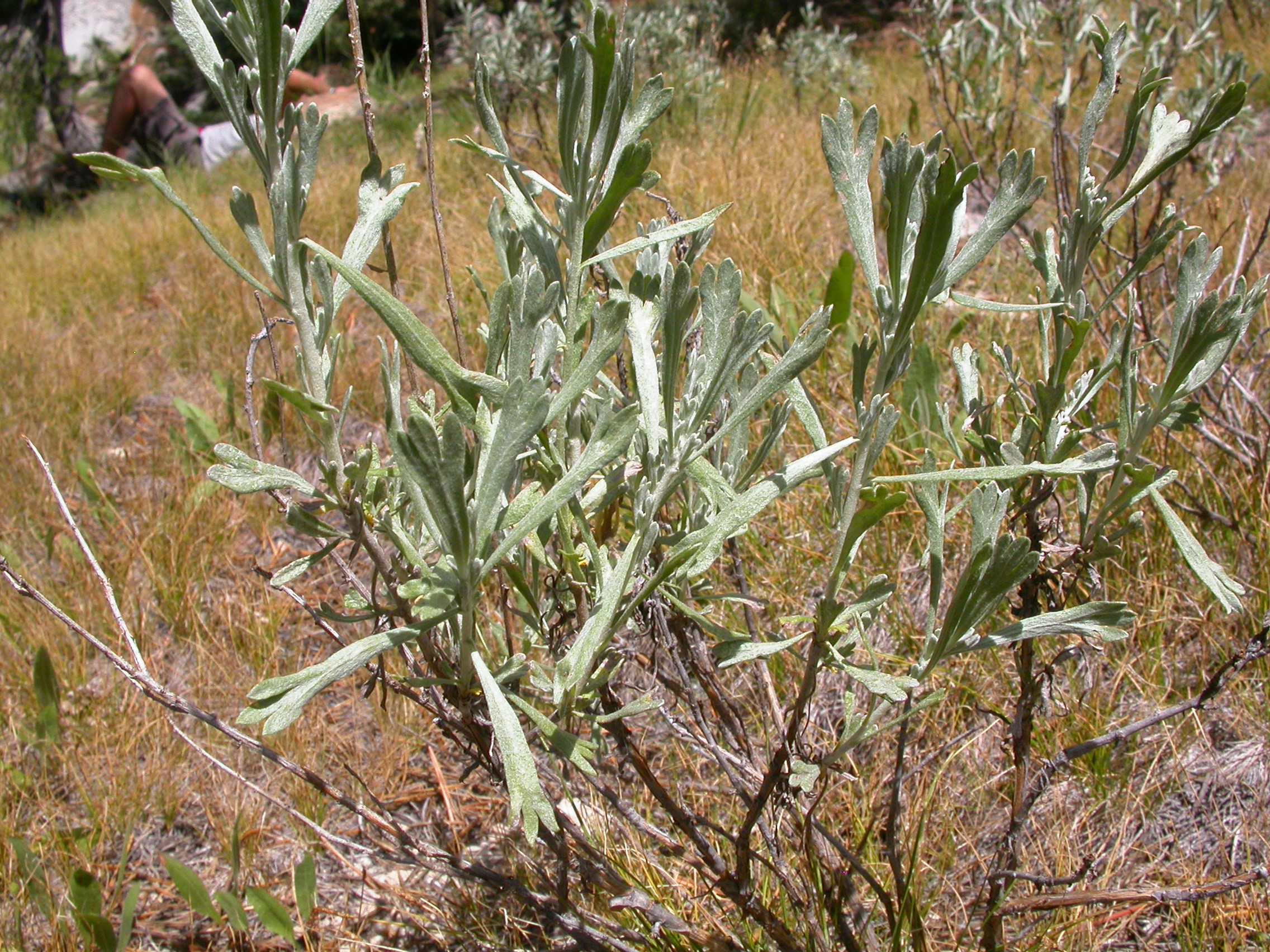
- Upper elevations of the Sierra Nevada

Conservation status
- Vulnerable (NatureServe)

Scientific classification
- Kingdom: Plantae
- Clade: Tracheophytes
- Clade: Angiosperms
- Clade: Eudicots
- Clade: Asterids
- Order: Asterales
- Family: Asteraceae
- Genus: Artemisia
- Species: A. spiciformis

Binomial name
- Artemisia spiciformis Osterh.

Synonyms
- Artemisia tridentata subsp. spiciformis (Osterh.) Kartesz & Gandhi; Seriphidium spiciforme (Osterh.) Y.R.Ling

= Artemisia spiciformis =

Species of flowering plant

Artemisia spiciformis is a North American species in the sunflower family, with the common name snowfield sagebrush. It grows at high elevations in the mountains, frequently in the vicinity of late-season snow.

== Distribution ==
It is found in the Western United States in California, Oregon, Washington, Idaho, Nevada, Utah, Wyoming, and Colorado.

== Description ==
Artemisia spiciformis is an aromatic shrub up to 80 cm (32 inches) tall. It has several stems and many small flower heads. It can be found on rocky slopes, open meadows, etc.
