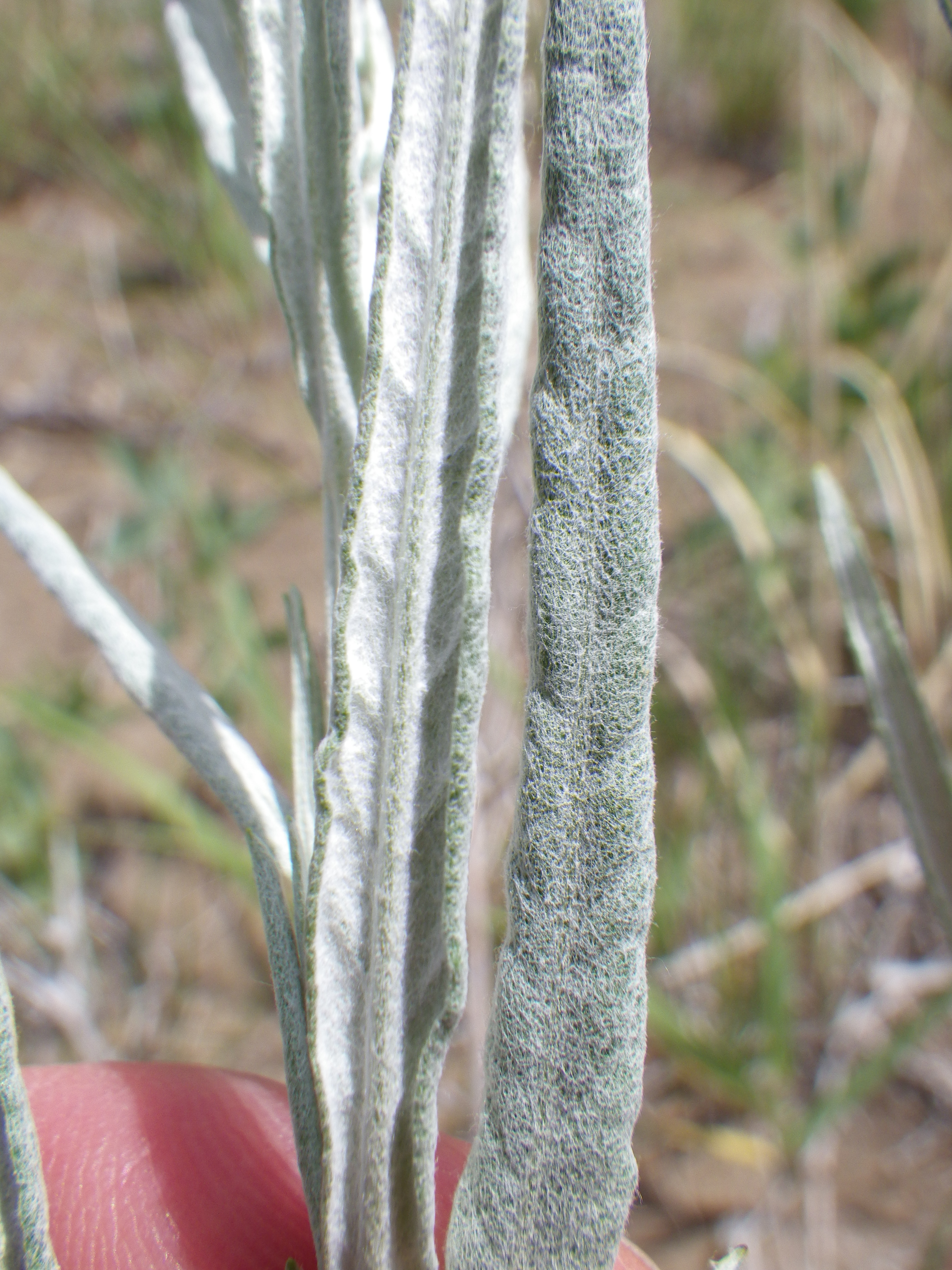

Scientific classification
- Kingdom: Plantae
- Clade: Tracheophytes
- Clade: Angiosperms
- Clade: Eudicots
- Clade: Asterids
- Order: Asterales
- Family: Asteraceae
- Genus: Artemisia
- Species: A. longifolia

Binomial name
- Artemisia longifolia Nutt.

Synonyms
- Artemisia ludoviciana var. integrifolia A.Nelson; Artemisia natronensis A.Nelson; Artemisia vulgaris var. longifolia (Nutt.) M.Peck; Artemisia vulgaris subsp. longifolia (Nutt.) H.M.Hall & Clem.

= Artemisia longifolia =

Species of flowering plant

Artemisia longifolia is North American species in the daisy family, known by the common name long-leaved sage or longleaf wormwood. It is native to western Canada (Manitoba, Saskatchewan, Alberta, British Columbia) and the north-central United States (Montana, the Dakotas, Minnesota, Wyoming, and Colorado with a few isolated populations in Oklahoma).

Artemisia longifolia is a perennial up to 80 cm (32 inches) tall, usually not forming clumps. Leaves are longer and narrower than for most related species, up to 12 cm (5 inches) long. The species grows in barren areas, in grasslands, and in alkaline flats in the high plains. It is completely deciduous unlike many related species in Artemisia.

== Cultivation ==
Considered a handsome plant by gardeners such as the author Claude A. Barr for its foliage and also for the very pleasant scent of its foliage when brushed against or crushed. It is relatively well behaved in the garden, not seeding as freely as some other Artemisia species and only being somewhat rhizomatous.
