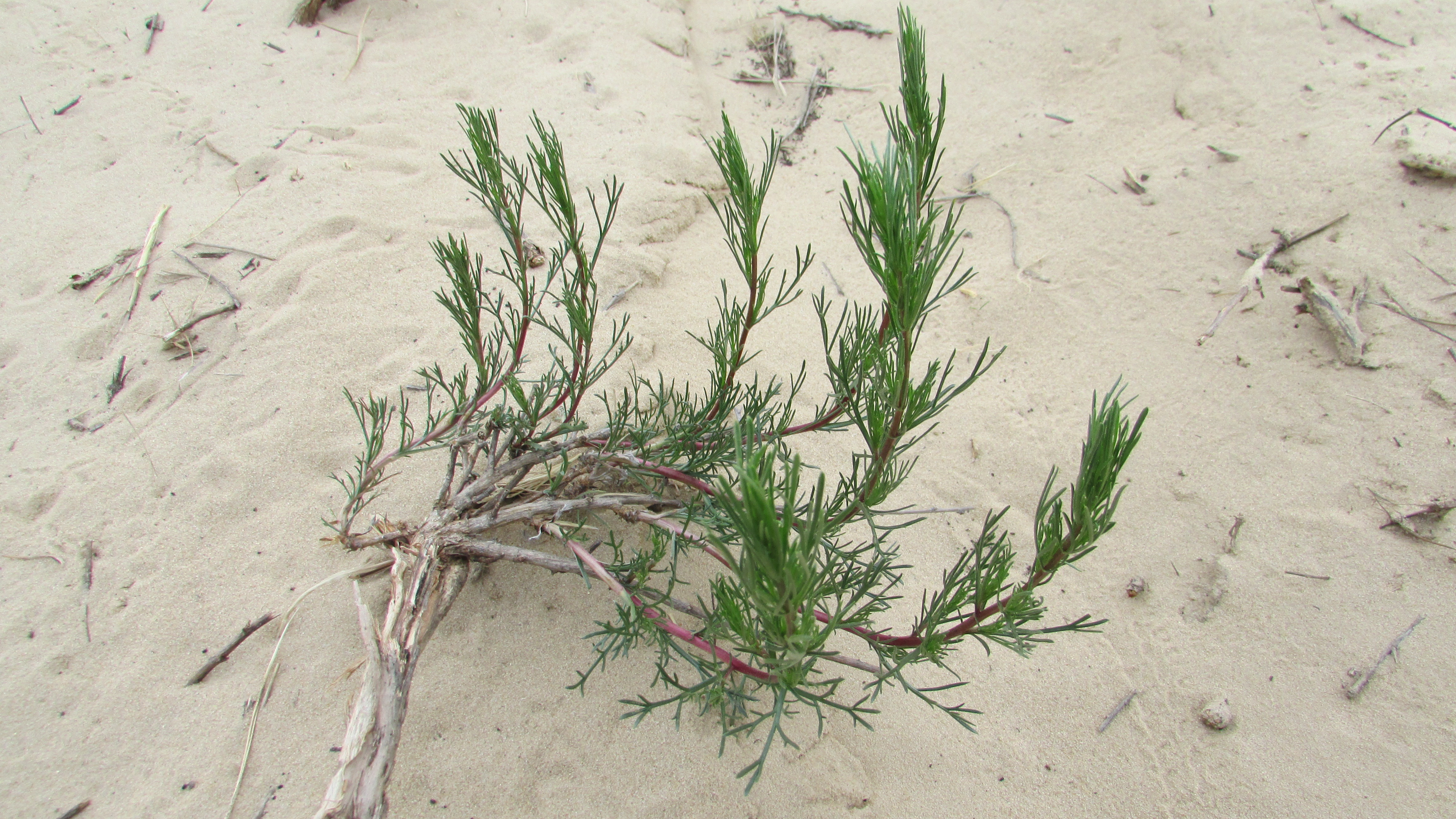
- In Oleshky Sands National Nature Park, Ukraine

Scientific classification
- Kingdom: Plantae
- Clade: Tracheophytes
- Clade: Angiosperms
- Clade: Eudicots
- Clade: Asterids
- Order: Asterales
- Family: Asteraceae
- Genus: Artemisia
- Species: A. arenaria

Binomial name
- Artemisia arenaria DC.

Synonyms
- Artemisia albicerata Krasch.; Artemisia fruticosa Willd. ex DC.; Artemisia lercheana Presc. ex Besser; Artemisia sabulosa Willd. ex Ledeb.; Artemisia subulata Willd. ex Steud.; Artemisia subulosa Willd. ex DC.; Draconia albicerata (Krasch.) Soják; Oligosporus albiceratus (Krasch.) Poljakov; Oligosporus arenarius (DC.) Poljakov

= Artemisia arenaria =

Species of flowering plant

Artemisia arenaria is a species of flowering plant in the family Asteraceae, native from Ukraine to Central Asia. It was first described by de Candolle in 1838.
