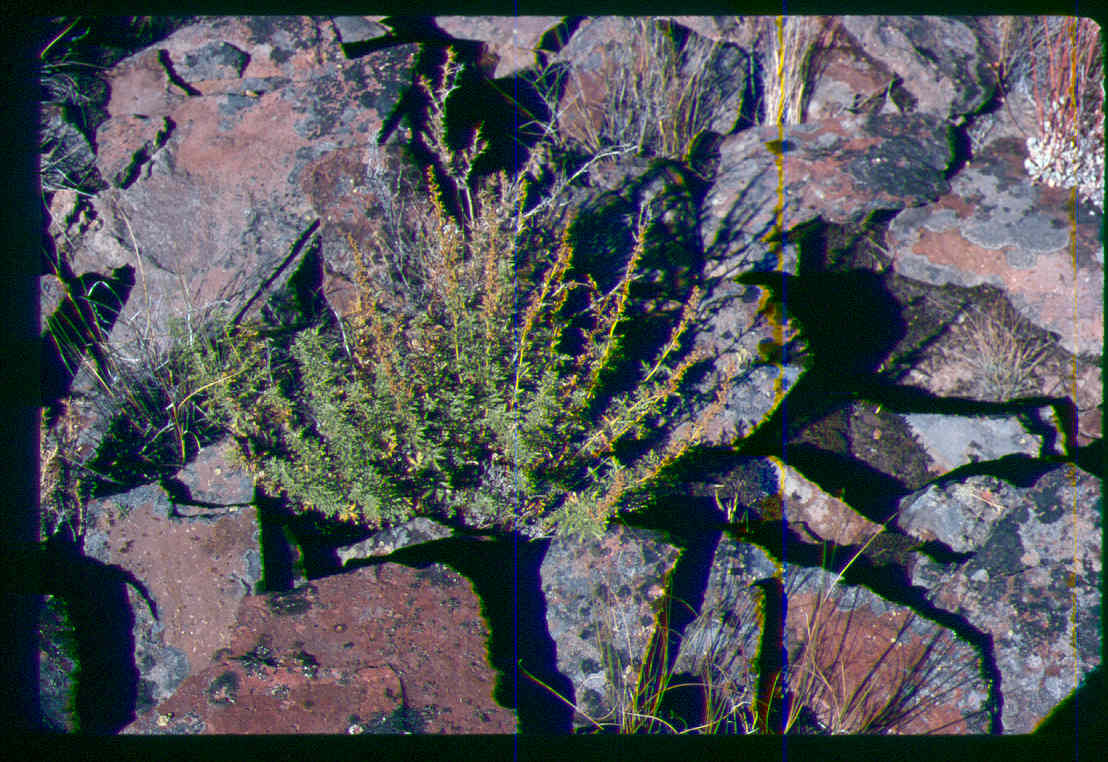

Conservation status
- Vulnerable (NatureServe)

Scientific classification
- Kingdom: Plantae
- Clade: Tracheophytes
- Clade: Angiosperms
- Clade: Eudicots
- Clade: Asterids
- Order: Asterales
- Family: Asteraceae
- Genus: Artemisia
- Species: A. packardiae

Binomial name
- Artemisia packardiae J.W.Grimes & Ertter

= Artemisia packardiae =

Species of flowering plant

Artemisia packardiae, also known as Succor Creek mugwort or Packard's wormwood, is a species of North American shrubs in the sunflower family. It grows in the Great Basin region of the western United States, in the States of Nevada, Idaho, and Oregon.

== Description ==
Artemisia packardiae is a strongly aromatic shrub up to 60 cm (25 inches) tall. It has dark green leaves and many small yellow heads. It grows in alkaline flats and coarse talus in desert areas.
