= Artemisia olchonensis =

Scientific classification
- Kingdom: Plantae
- Clade: Embryophytes
- Clade: Tracheophytes
- Clade: Spermatophytes
- Clade: Angiosperms
- Clade: Eudicots
- Clade: Asterids
- Order: Asterales
- Family: Asteraceae
- Genus: Artemisia
- Species: A. olchonensis

Binomial name
- Artemisia olchonensis Leonova

Species of flowering plant

Artemisia olchonensis is a species of flowering plant in the wormwood genus Artemisia, family Asteraceae, native to Irkutsk Oblast in Russia. It is found only on Olkhon Island of Lake Baikal.
