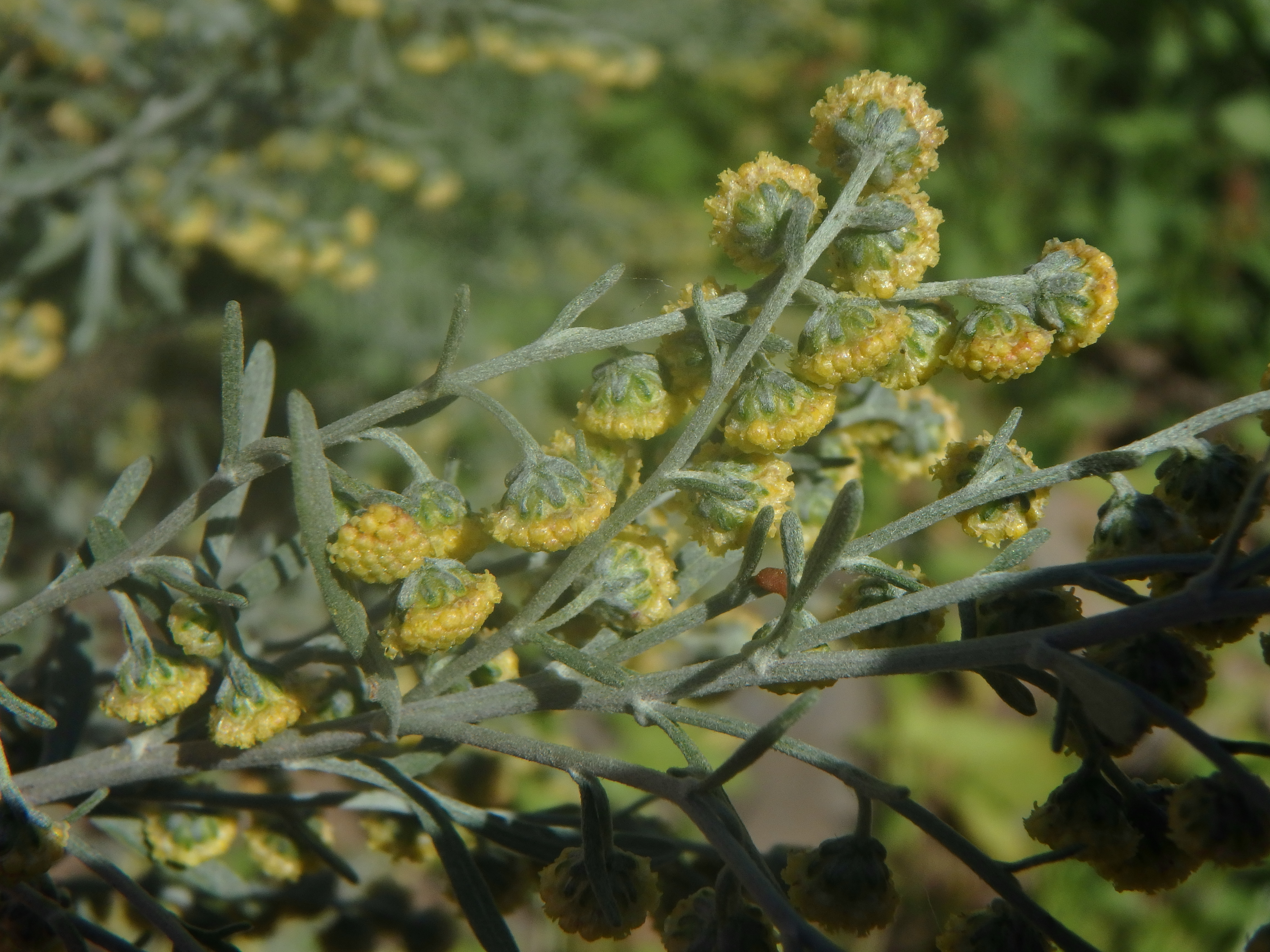

Scientific classification
- Kingdom: Plantae
- Clade: Tracheophytes
- Clade: Angiosperms
- Clade: Eudicots
- Clade: Asterids
- Order: Asterales
- Family: Asteraceae
- Genus: Artemisia
- Species: A. thuscula

Binomial name
- Artemisia thuscula Cav. 1801

Synonyms
- Synonymy: Absinthium canariense Besser; Artemisia argentea Buch; Artemisia canariensis (Besser) Less.

= Artemisia thuscula =

Species of flowering plant

Artemisia thuscula (Incienso) is a species endemic to the Canary Islands. It is frequent in dry areas at lower elevations (50–700 m). Its capitula are globose and leaf lobes flat.
