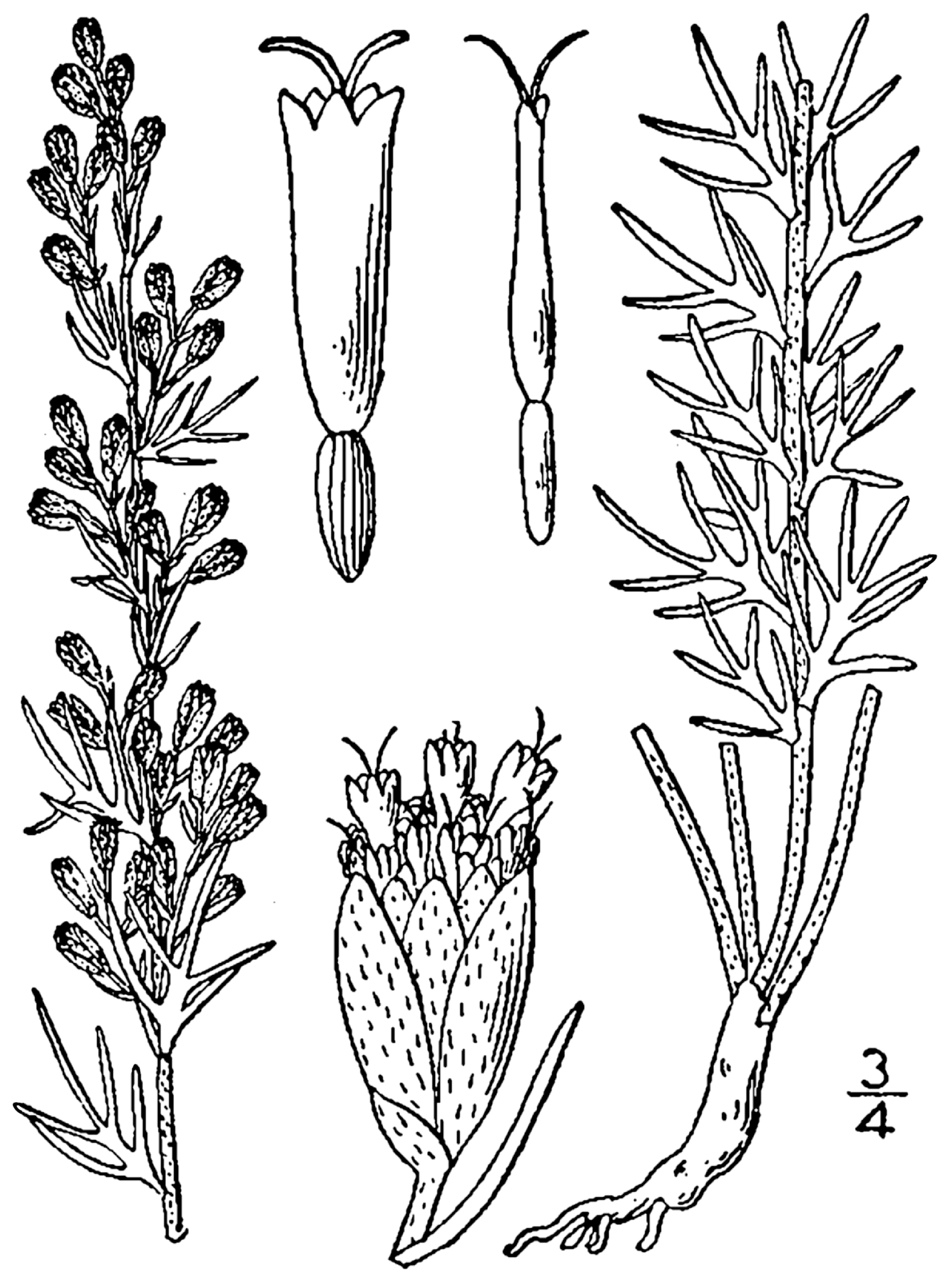

Conservation status
- Apparently Secure (NatureServe)

Scientific classification
- Kingdom: Plantae
- Clade: Tracheophytes
- Clade: Angiosperms
- Clade: Eudicots
- Clade: Asterids
- Order: Asterales
- Family: Asteraceae
- Genus: Artemisia
- Species: A. carruthii

Binomial name
- Artemisia carruthii Wood ex Carruth.

Synonyms
- Artemisia bakeri Greene; Artemisia coloradensis Osterh.; Artemisia kansana Britton ex Britton; Artemisia wrightii A.Gray

= Artemisia carruthii =

Species of flowering plant

Artemisia carruthii, common name Carruth's sagewort or Carruth wormwood, is a North American species of shrubs in the daisy family native to much of south-central and southwestern United States (Nevada, Arizona, New Mexico, Utah, Colorado, Kansas, Oklahoma, northern + western Texas). There are reports of a few naturalized populations in Missouri, the Great Lakes Region, and Rhode Island. It is also native to the States of Chihuahua and Sonora in northern Mexico.

Artemisia carruthii is an erect perennial herb up to 70 cm (28 inches) tall. It is faintly aromatic and covered with hairs. Flowers and yellow and nodding (hanging). It grows in grasslands as well as open and wooded areas.

== Uses ==
The Zuni people put the seeds on coals and use then as a sweat bath for body pains from a severe cold. The ground seeds are also mixed with water, made into balls, steamed and used for food. These seeds are considered by the Zuni to be one of the most important food plants.

The species is named for American botanist James Harrison Carruth, 1807–1896.
