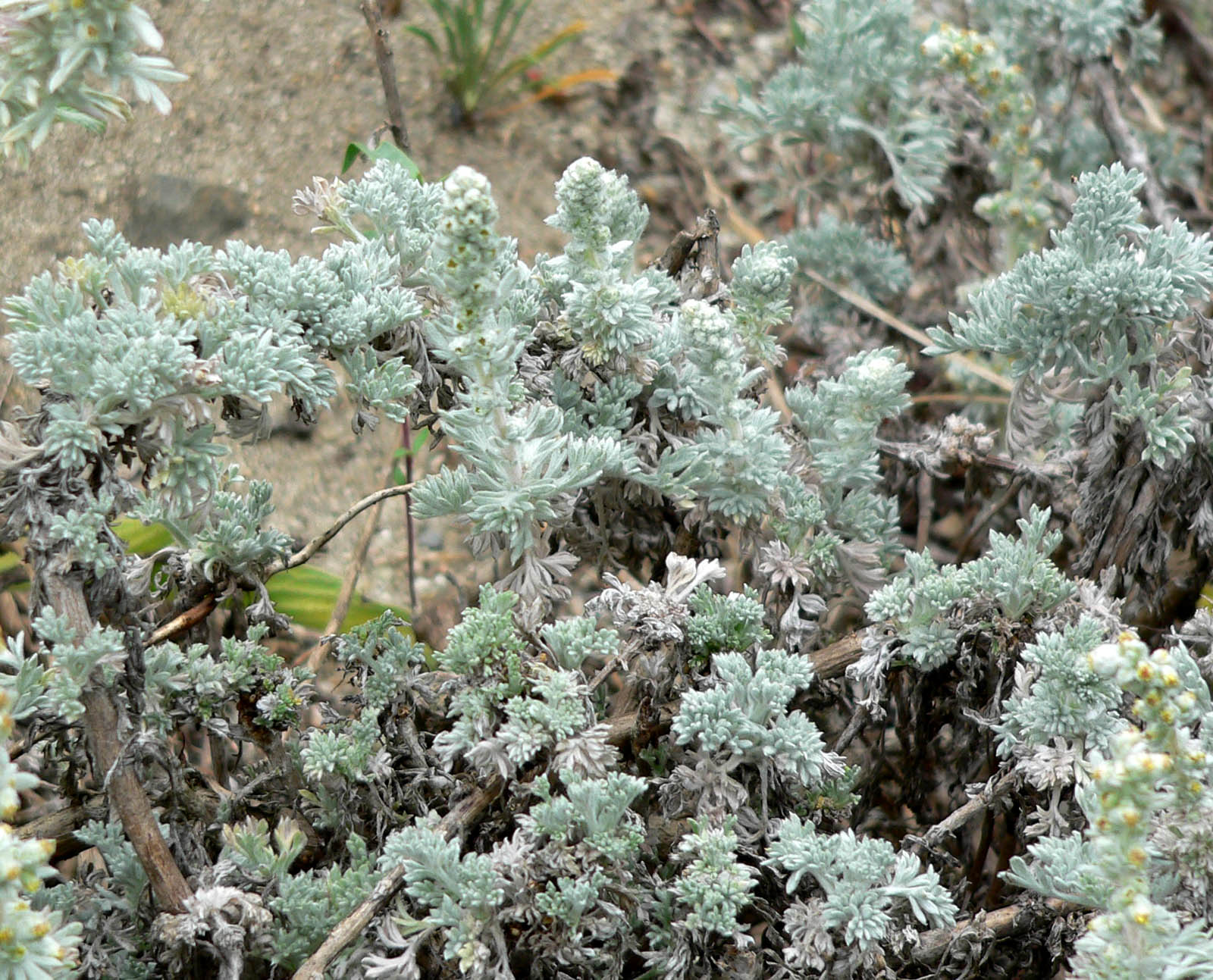

Conservation status
- Apparently Secure (NatureServe)

Scientific classification
- Kingdom: Plantae
- Clade: Tracheophytes
- Clade: Angiosperms
- Clade: Eudicots
- Clade: Asterids
- Order: Asterales
- Family: Asteraceae
- Genus: Artemisia
- Species: A. pycnocephala

Binomial name
- Artemisia pycnocephala DC.

Synonyms
- Artemisia pachystachya DC.; Artemisia pycnostachya Torr. & A.Gray; Oligosporus pycnocephalus Less.

= Artemisia pycnocephala =

Species of flowering plant

Artemisia pycnocephala is a North American species of sagebrush in the sunflower family, known by the common names beach wormwood, sandhill sage, and coastal sagewort.

This plant is native to the western United States coastline extending from central Oregon to southern California.

== Description ==
It is a leafy perennial wormwood forming clumps about 50 cm (20 inches) in height. It extends erect stems covered in dense foliage which ranges in color from light green to nearly white. The fuzzy inflorescences are studded with small lobular leaves and rounded yellowish flower buds. The plant is aromatic but much less so than are other wormwoods.

== Plant community and distribution ==
Artemisia pycnocephala is native to Oregon's and California's coastal strand plant community where it enjoys rocky and sandy soil. According to The University of California, Berkeley and Jepson Herbaria, this plant prefers to grow under 200 m. The plant's range within the State of California stretches primarily from Del Norte County to San Luis Obispo County, with isolated populations reported from Los Angeles and San Diego Counties.
