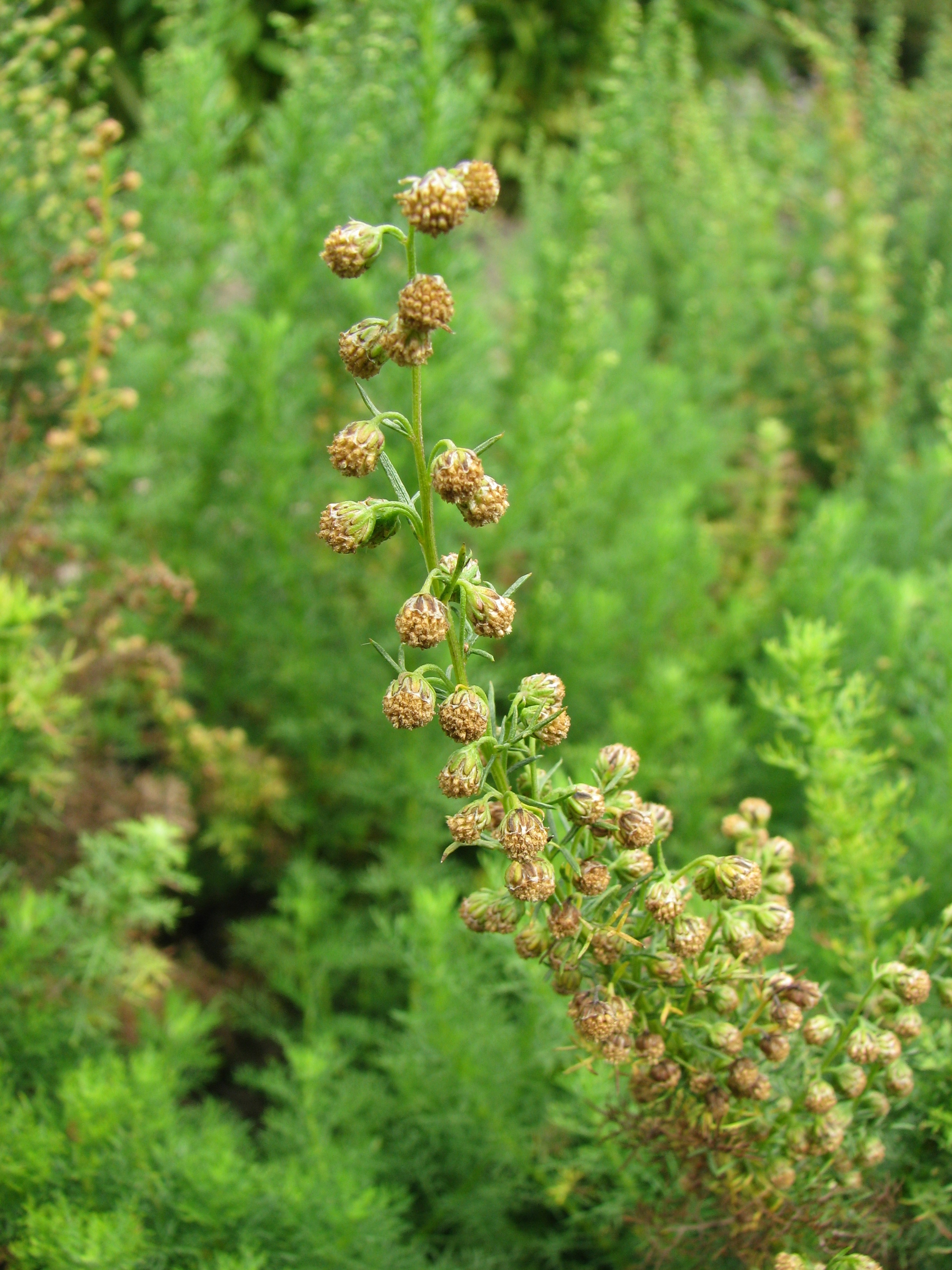

Scientific classification
- Kingdom: Plantae
- Clade: Tracheophytes
- Clade: Angiosperms
- Clade: Eudicots
- Clade: Asterids
- Order: Asterales
- Family: Asteraceae
- Genus: Artemisia
- Species: A. rupestris

Binomial name
- Artemisia rupestris L.

= Artemisia rupestris =

Species of flowering plant

Artemisia rupestris is a species of plant belonging to the family Asteraceae.

Its native range is Europe to Siberia and Afghanistan.
