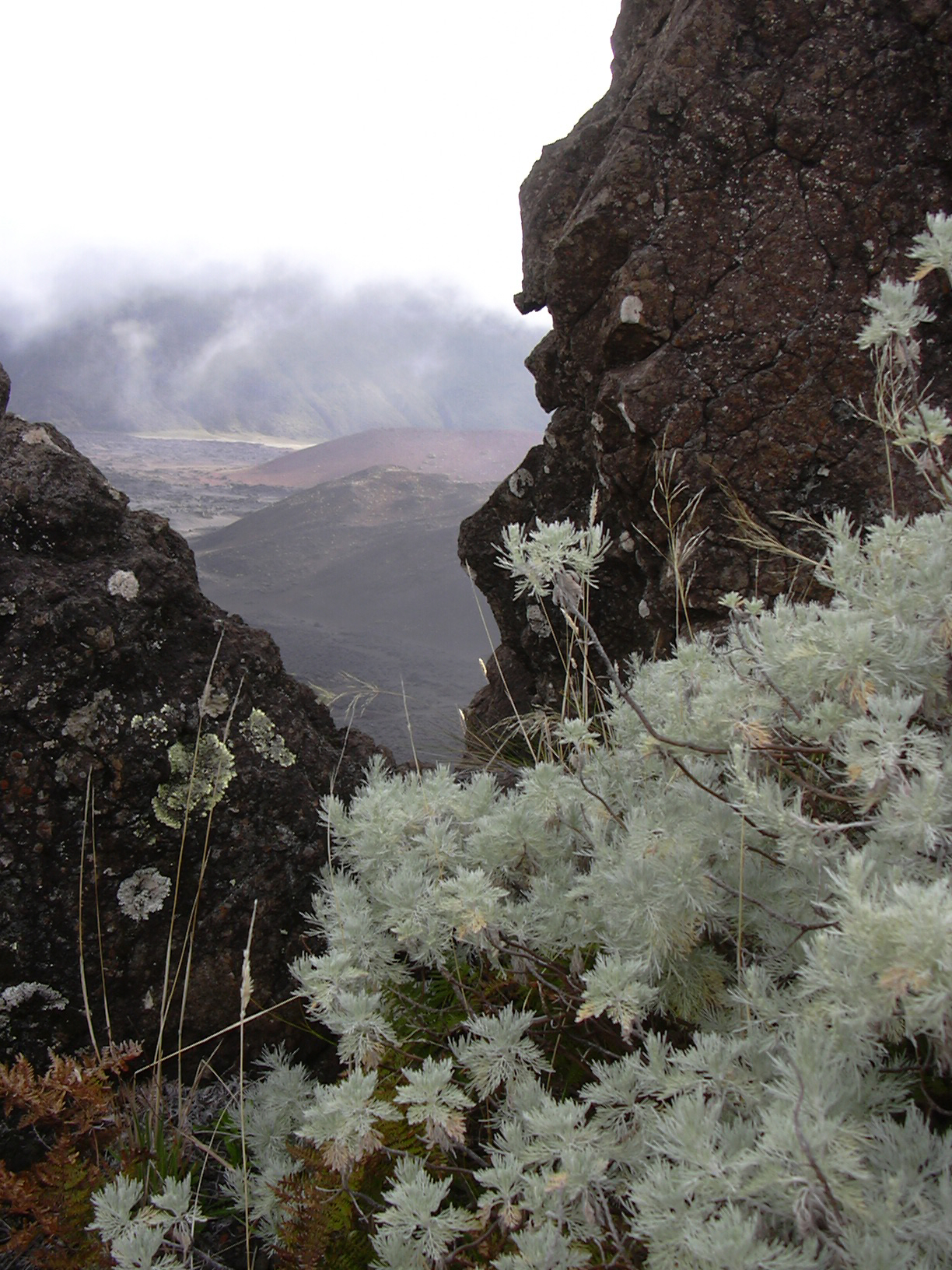
- Some Artemisia mauiensis at Haleakalā National Park

Scientific classification
- Kingdom: Plantae
- Clade: Embryophytes
- Clade: Tracheophytes
- Clade: Angiosperms
- Clade: Eudicots
- Clade: Asterids
- Order: Asterales
- Family: Asteraceae
- Genus: Artemisia
- Species: A. mauiensis

Binomial name
- Artemisia mauiensis (A.Gray) Skottsb.

= Artemisia mauiensis =

Species of plant

Artemisia mauiensis, also known as Maui wormwood, hinahina, ''āhinahina, or Maui mugwort, is a flowering plant of the Asteraceae family. It is endemic to the island of Maui in Hawaiʻi and is currently considered imperiled. This non-woody shrub is recognized for its dramatic silvery leaves and is one of three endemic Artemisia species that are endemic to the Hawaiian Islands.

== Description ==
This species grows as a clumping, sprawling shrub that reaches two to six feet in height and four to five feet in width. While it usually grows to about 3 feet in ideal garden conditions, it can spread to a width of 4 to 5 feet. The plant is most notable for its spectacular silvery tomentose (fuzzy) foliage, which acts as a form of "botanical sunscreen". The leaves are finely textured, ranging from one to two inches in length, and they are finely divided and feather-like. While the plant produces flowers, they are considered unshowy and appear in shades of brownish-cream. The foliage is faintly aromatic, possessing a scent reminiscent of sagebrush or wormwood; however, the raw leaves have an extremely bitter taste. It is a long-lived species, often surviving for more than five years.

== Distribution and habitat ==
Artemisia mauiensis is found exclusively on the high elevation slopes of Haleakalā, Maui. Its natural habitat consists of exposed volcanic rock faces, bare rock, talus, and scree. It is also found in 'Akoko (Chamaesyce) Montane Dry Forests, characterized by an open tree canopy between 3 and 20 meters high. The plant typically thrives at elevations between 1,900 and 2,300 meters (6,200 to 7,500 feet), though it is highly adaptable and can grow in lower-elevation gardens or even windward coastal sites. In these environments, it requires well-drained soil composed of sand or cinder and is highly tolerant of drought, wind, and heat.

== Human use and cultural aignificance ==
The genus name Artemisia is derived from Artemis, the Greek goddess of the hunt, while the specific epithet mauiensis refers to its home island. The name "hinahina" was a general term applied by Hawaiians to various endemic plants covered in silvery hairs, including the silversword and certain geraniums. This shared name also applied to the coastal subshrub Heliotropium anomalum, which is similarly distinguished by its silvery, rosette-clustered foliage. Specifically, "āhinahina" refers to the "gray- or white-haired" appearance of the foliage. Historically, early Hawaiians used this plant to preserve royal feather cloaks from insect destruction by placing it inside storage calabashes. It also served medicinal purposes, specifically with the leaves being pounded as a treatment for asthma. In modern landscaping, it is recommended as an endemic alternative to "Dusty Miller" and is used as an accent or specimen plant in xeriscaping. Its silvery stem tips are also valued for use in lei making and floral arrangements.

== Conservation status ==
This plant is listed as G2 or imperiled globally according to Nature Serve as was reviewed in 1998. In the United States and Hawaii, it is listed as imperiled (N2 and S2, respectively). Despite being endemic and endangered, this plant is not yet included in the US endangered species list.

== Uses ==
=== Traditional ===
'Āhinahina leaves were crushed to be used for treating asthma. They were traditionally used for keeping feathered cloaks from insects by placing the plant inside calabashes housing the cloaks.

=== Modern ===
Presently, the plant is mainly used for decorative purposes especially in making lei and arrangements. They are extremely useful as an ornamental shrub for xeriscaping and container growing as specimen shrubs.

=== Cultivation ===
These plants thrive in full sun which is required to enhance their unique silver coloration. Well-draining substrates such as sand or cinder and hot dry conditions are ideal for these shrubs while waterlogging kills them immediately. Although they thrive in exposed areas in high altitude, they have shown great adaptation to lower elevations and windward coastal sites in containers. Over fertilization causes an "unnatural-looking" lanky plant with lost of silvery color.
