= Artemisia orientalixizangensis =

Scientific classification
- Kingdom: Plantae
- Clade: Tracheophytes
- Clade: Angiosperms
- Clade: Eudicots
- Clade: Asterids
- Order: Asterales
- Family: Asteraceae
- Genus: Artemisia
- Species: A. orientalixizangensis

Binomial name
- Artemisia orientalixizangensis Y.-R. Ling & Humphries

Synonyms
- Artemisia orientali-xizangensis Y.-R. Ling & Humphries, alternate spelling

Species of flowering plant

Artemisia orientalixizangensis is a rare Tibetan species of plants in the sunflower family. It is found only in eastern and southeastern Tibet.

Artemisia orientalixizangensis is a perennial herb up to 40 cm (16 inches) tall. Inflorescence is a tall, narrow, spike-like panicle of small flower heads. The plant grows on slopes and roadsides at mid-elevations in the mountains.

The epithet "orientalixizangensis" is from Latin "orientalis" meaning "eastern" and "Xizang", the Chinese name for Tibet.
