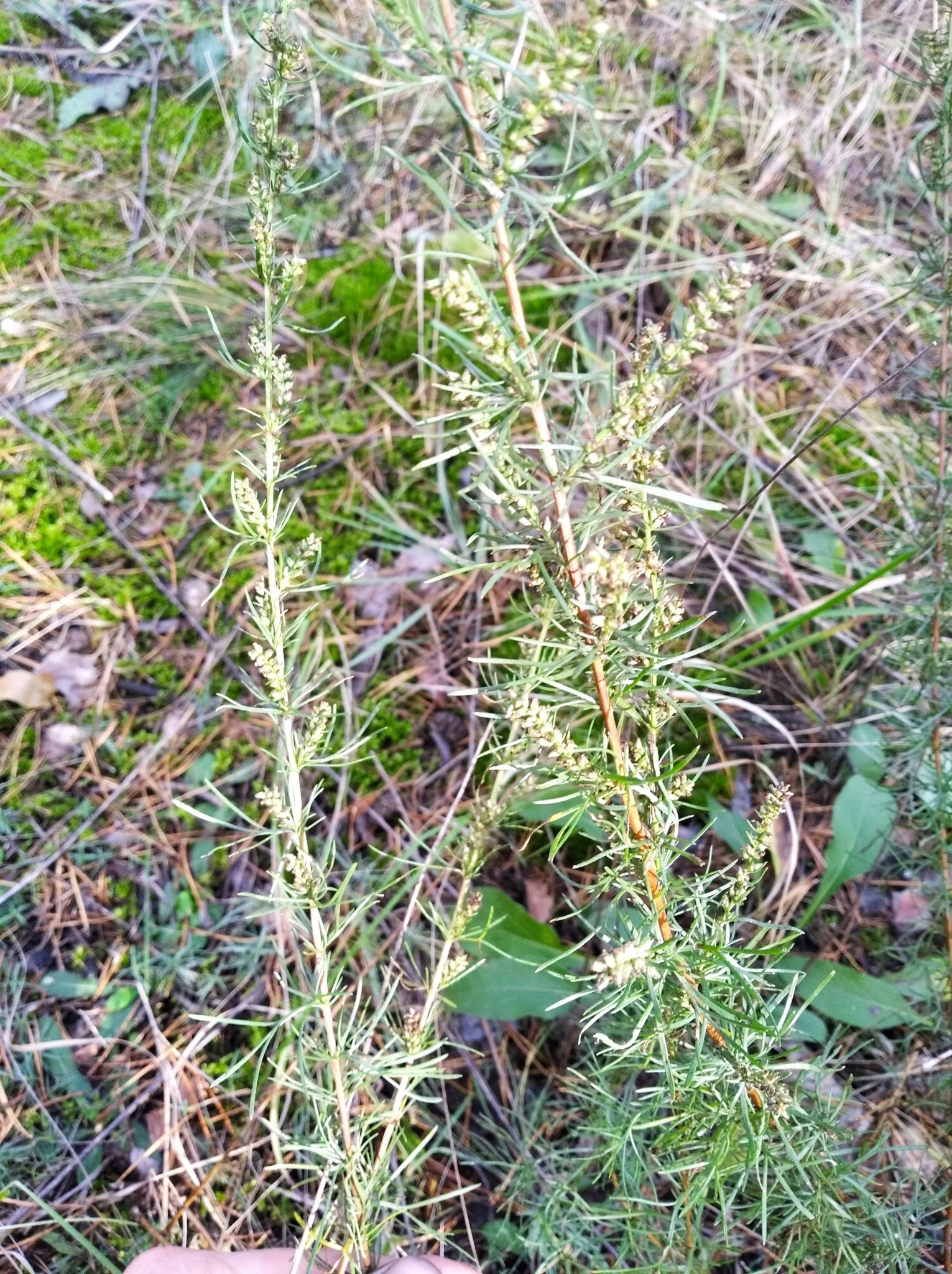

Scientific classification
- Kingdom: Plantae
- Clade: Tracheophytes
- Clade: Angiosperms
- Clade: Eudicots
- Clade: Asterids
- Order: Asterales
- Family: Asteraceae
- Genus: Artemisia
- Species: A. marschalliana

Binomial name
- Artemisia marschalliana Spreng.

Synonyms
- Artemisia araratica Krasch.; Artemisia eldarica Rzazade; Artemisia inodora M.Bieb.; Artemisia sosnovskyi Krasch.; Artemisia tschernieviana Besser; Draconia tschernieviana (Besser) Soják; Dracunculus marschallianus Ledeb.; Oligosporus marschallianus Less.

= Artemisia marschalliana =

Species of flowering plant

Artemisia marschalliana is a species of flowering plant in the family Asteraceae, native from Europe to Mongolia and the Caucasus. It was first described by Sprengel in 1826. It has been treated as a synonym of Artemisia campestris.
