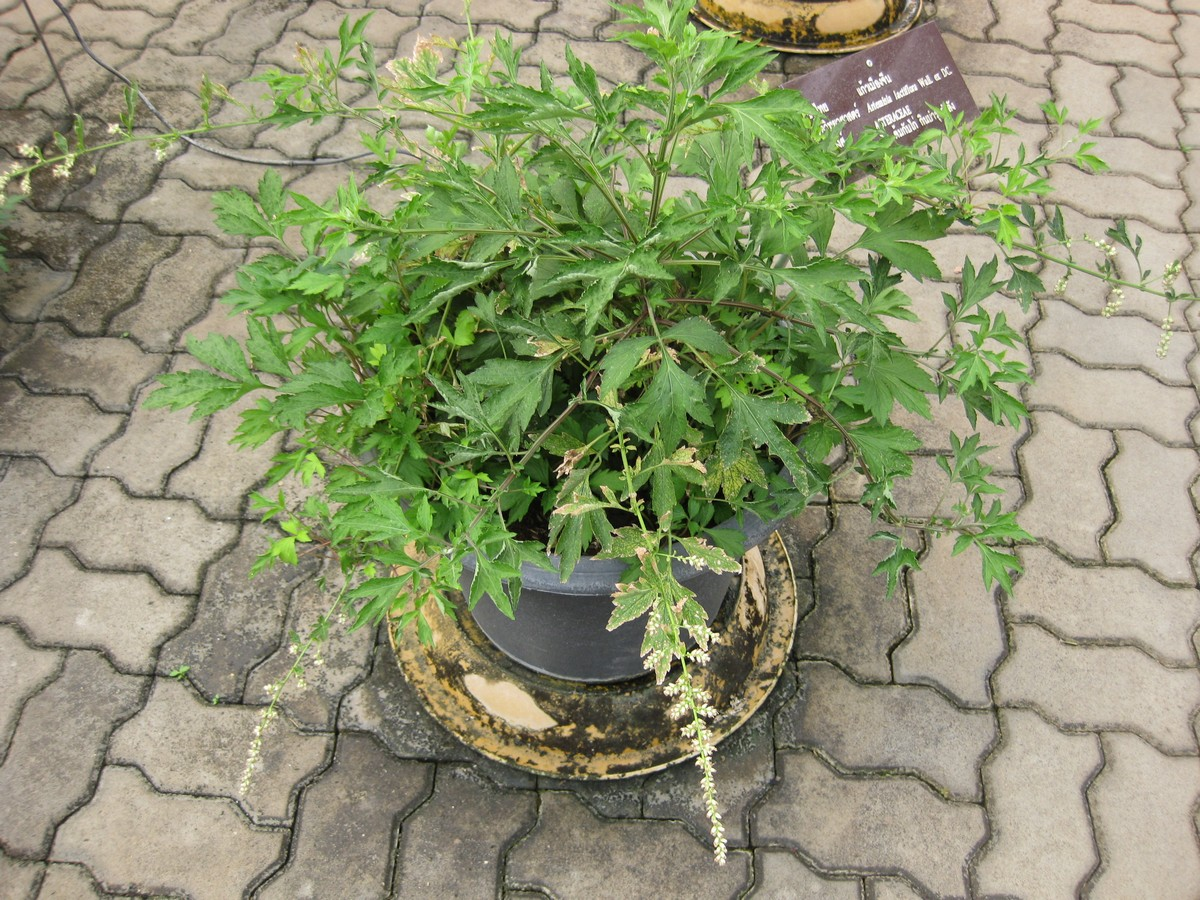

Scientific classification
- Kingdom: Plantae
- Clade: Embryophytes
- Clade: Tracheophytes
- Clade: Spermatophytes
- Clade: Angiosperms
- Clade: Eudicots
- Clade: Asterids
- Order: Asterales
- Family: Asteraceae
- Genus: Artemisia
- Species: A. lactiflora

Binomial name
- Artemisia lactiflora Wall. ex DC.

= Artemisia lactiflora =

Species of flowering plant

Artemisia lactiflora, the white mugwort, is a species of flowering plant in the daisy family, native to western China. It is a vigorous clump-forming herbaceous perennial growing to 1.5 m (4 ft 11 in), with plumes of creamy-white flower heads appearing in summer and autumn above dark green leaves. This is the only artemisia which is cultivated as much for its flowers as for its foliage. Plants grown in poor dry soil are hardier and last longer than those grown in heavy, damp soil.

The specific epithet lactiflora means "milk-white flowers".

This plant has gained the Royal Horticultural Society's Award of Garden Merit.
