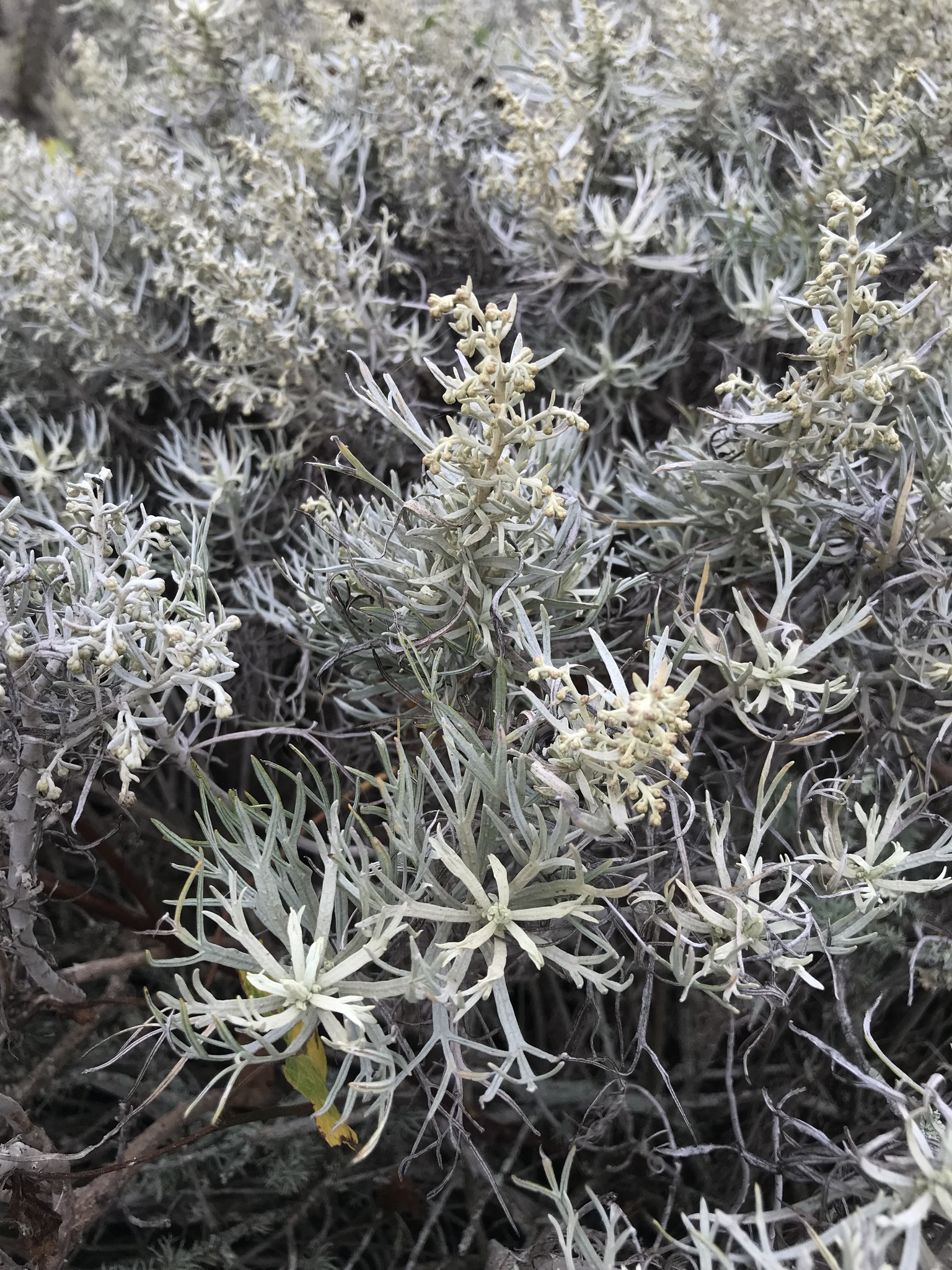

Conservation status
- Vulnerable (NatureServe)

Scientific classification
- Kingdom: Plantae
- Clade: Tracheophytes
- Clade: Angiosperms
- Clade: Eudicots
- Clade: Asterids
- Order: Asterales
- Family: Asteraceae
- Genus: Artemisia
- Species: A. nesiotica

Binomial name
- Artemisia nesiotica P.H.Raven

Synonyms
- Artemisia californica var. insularis (Rydb.) Munz; Crossostephium insulare Rydb.

= Artemisia nesiotica =

Species of flowering plant

Artemisia nesiotica is a rare California species of sagebrush in the daisy family, known by the common name island sagebrush. It is endemic to the Channel Islands of California, found on 3 of the 8 islands (San Nicolas, San Clemente, and Santa Barbara Islands).

== Description ==
Artemisia nesiotica is a small shrub growing up to about 50 cm (20 inches) tall and generally rounded in shape. It produces several thin, upright stems from a woody base. The foliage is made up of woolly leaves divided into many thin, flat, threadlike segments. The inflorescence is a narrow cluster of several flower heads. The fruit is a tiny resinous achene with a pappus of hairs.

== Etymology ==
The earliest name given to the plaint was Crossostephium insulare, coined by Per Axel Rydberg in 1916. In 1935, Philip Alexander Munz declared this to be a variety of Artemisia californica. Peter Raven later wanted to recognize the Channel Island plants as a distinct species within Artemisia, but the name Artemisia insularis had already been used for a Kuril Islands plant in 1936. Hence Raven's new name, Artemisia nesiotica.
