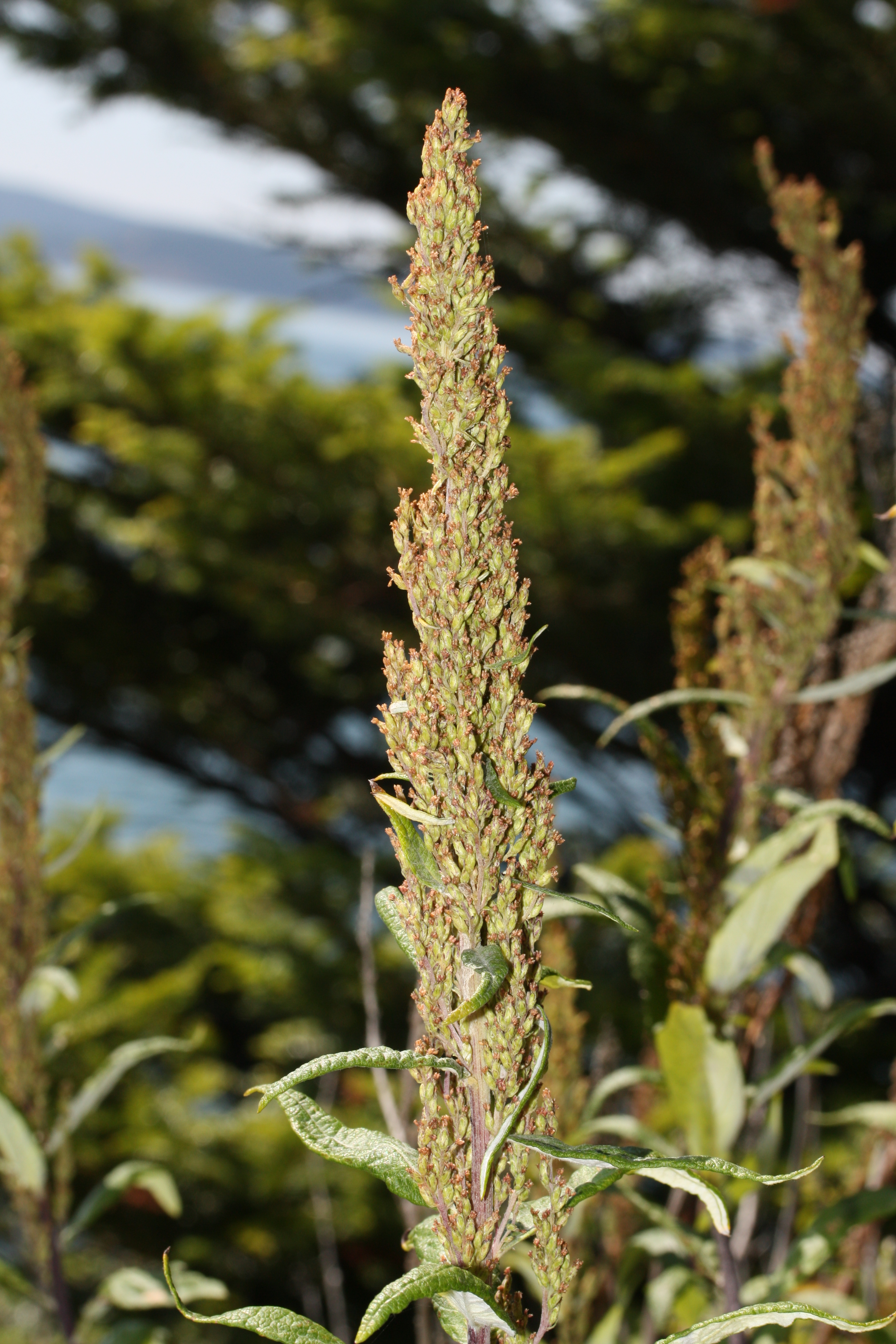

Conservation status
- Secure (NatureServe)

Scientific classification
- Kingdom: Plantae
- Clade: Tracheophytes
- Clade: Angiosperms
- Clade: Eudicots
- Clade: Asterids
- Order: Asterales
- Family: Asteraceae
- Genus: Artemisia
- Species: A. suksdorfii

Binomial name
- Artemisia suksdorfii Piper

Synonyms
- Artemisia heterophylla Nutt. 1841 not Besser 1834; Artemisia vulgaris var. littoralis Suksd.

= Artemisia suksdorfii =

Species of flowering plant

Artemisia suksdorfii is a North American species of sagebrush in the sunflower family. It is known by the common names coastal mugwort, coastal wormwood, and Suksdorf sagewort. It is native to coastal regions from British Columbia, Washington, Oregon, and northern California as far south as Sonoma County, with isolated populations on Santa Catalina Island in Los Angeles County.

Artemisia suksdorfii grows in coastal drainages and other habitat near the ocean. This is a rhizomatous perennial herb producing many erect stems one half to two meters in height. The unbranched stems are brownish and have woody bases. The leaves are narrow and lobed, green and hairless on top and white and woolly underneath. The inflorescence is generally spike-like, up to 30 centimeters long and a few wide. It contains many clusters of small flower heads with shiny yellow-green phyllaries and yellow disc and pistillate florets. The fruit is a tiny achene less than a millimeter long.

The species is named for German-American botanist Wilhelm Nikolaus Suksdorf (1850-1932).
