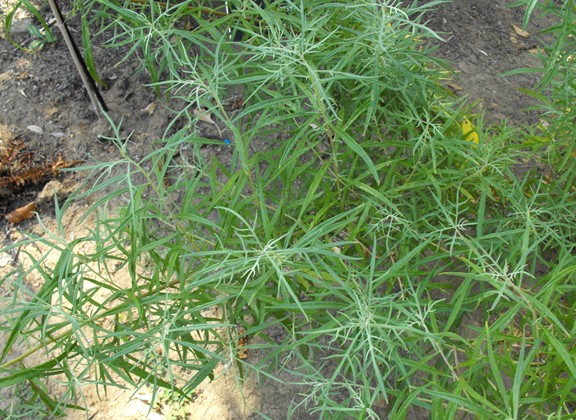

Scientific classification
- Kingdom: Plantae
- Clade: Tracheophytes
- Clade: Angiosperms
- Clade: Eudicots
- Clade: Asterids
- Order: Asterales
- Family: Asteraceae
- Genus: Artemisia
- Species: A. palmeri

Binomial name
- Artemisia palmeri A.Gray

Synonyms
- Artemisiastrum palmeri (A.Gray) Rydb.; Seriphidium palmeri (A.Gray) K. Bremer & Humphries

= Artemisia palmeri =

Species of tree

Artemisia palmeri is a rare species of sagebrush known by the common names San Diego sagewort and Palmer sagewort.

== Distribution and habitat ==
The plant is native to northwestern Baja California and southwestern California, primarily in San Diego County.

Its natural habitat is sandy coastal ravines in the coastal sage scrub plant community and riparian riverbeds in the Cuyamaca Mountains and other Peninsular Ranges, below 600 metres (2,000 ft) in elevation. Most of this habitat has been destroyed as the land has been developed for human uses. It is occasionally found farther inland in chaparral plant communities near Redlands and in the San Emigdio Mountains.

It is listed on the California Native Plant Society Inventory of Rare and Endangered Plants as an endangered species, due to the threat of further habitat loss.

== Description ==
Artemisia palmeri is a perennial or biennial herb producing brittle erect or spreading stems 1–3 metres (3.3–9.8 ft) tall. The base is woody.

The gray-green aromatic foliage is made up of long, narrow leaves deeply cut into several narrow, pointed lobes.

The inflorescence contains clusters of flower heads containing pale yellow glandular disc florets. It blooms generally from June to October.

The fruit is a tiny achene about a millimeter long.
