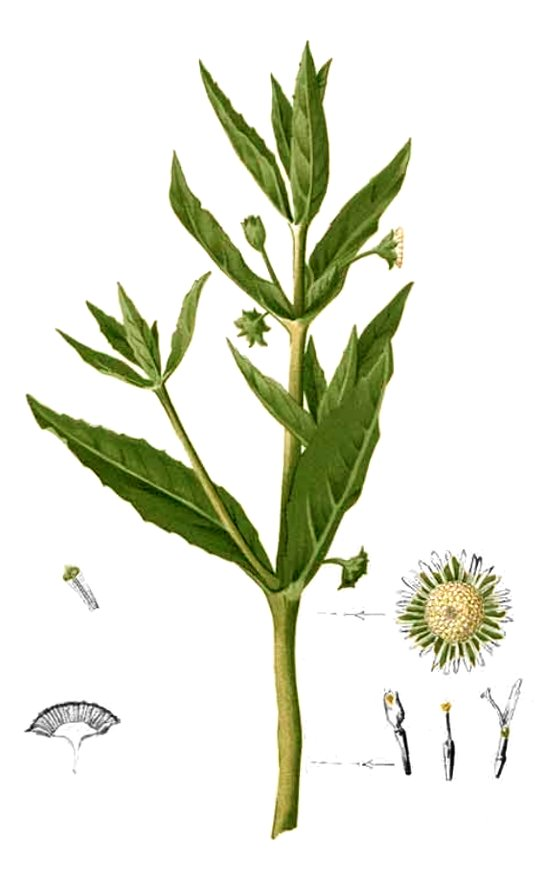

Scientific classification
- Kingdom: Plantae
- Clade: Tracheophytes
- Clade: Angiosperms
- Clade: Eudicots
- Clade: Asterids
- Order: Asterales
- Family: Asteraceae
- Genus: Artemisia
- Species: A. viridis

Binomial name
- Artemisia viridis Willd. ex DC. 1838

= Artemisia viridis =

Species of flowering plant

Artemisia viridis is a Central Asian species of plants in the family Asteraceae. It is widespread across the Kazakhstan, Mongolia, Tajikistan.
