= Artemisia porteri =

Conservation status
- Imperiled (NatureServe)

Scientific classification
- Kingdom: Plantae
- Clade: Tracheophytes
- Clade: Angiosperms
- Clade: Eudicots
- Clade: Asterids
- Order: Asterales
- Family: Asteraceae
- Genus: Artemisia
- Species: A. porteri

Binomial name
- Artemisia porteri Cronquist

Species of flowering plant

Artemisia porteri is a species of flowering plant in the aster family known by the common names Porter's sagebrush, Porter's wormwood, and Porter mugwort. It is endemic to Wyoming in the United States, where it is known from Fremont, Johnson and Natrona Counties.

This plant is a perennial herb or small subshrub, growing in clumps or mats up to 14 centimeters tall. There are several woolly stems with silvery lobed leaves. Bell-shaped woolly flower heads contain small yellowish disc florets.

This plant grows in the badlands of central Wyoming. It can be found on substrates of mudstone and eroding clay which are mostly barren of vegetation.
