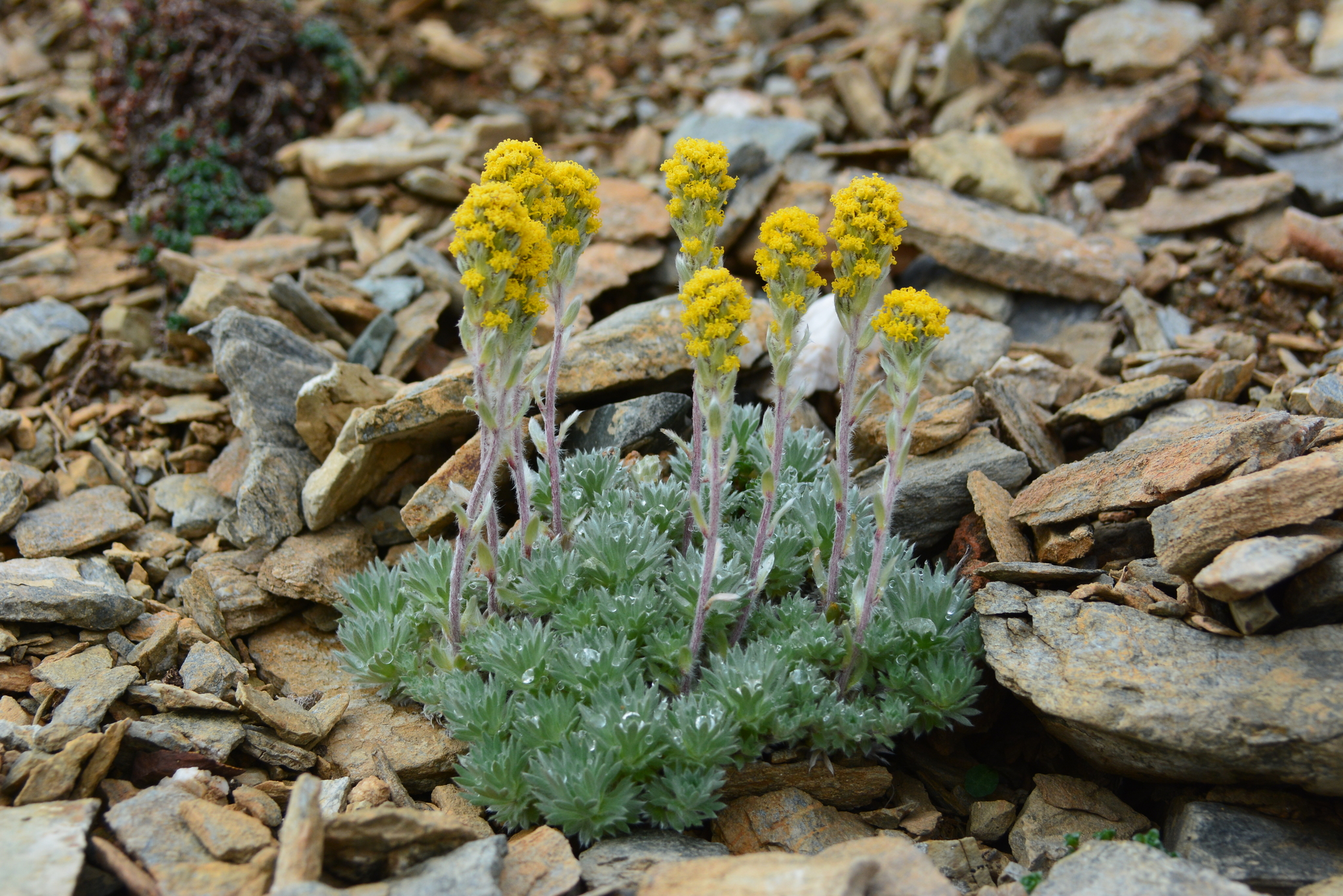

Scientific classification
- Kingdom: Plantae
- Clade: Tracheophytes
- Clade: Angiosperms
- Clade: Eudicots
- Clade: Asterids
- Order: Asterales
- Family: Asteraceae
- Genus: Artemisia
- Species: A. senjavinensis

Binomial name
- Artemisia senjavinensis Besser

Synonyms
- Ajania senjavinensis (Besser) Poljakov; Artemisia androsacea Seem.; Artemisia glomerata Hook. & Arn.; Artemisia semavinensis Besser

= Artemisia senjavinensis =

Species of flowering plant

Artemisia senjavinensis, the arctic wormwood, is a rare Arctic species of plants in the family Asteraceae. It has been found only on the Seward Peninsula on the Alaskan side of the Bering Strait and on the Chukotka (Chukchi) Peninsula on the Russian side.

Artemisia senjavinensis is a shrub up to 90 cm (3 feet) tall, with many stems densely clumped together. Leaves are gray-green, woolly, mostly in rosettes close to the ground. There are many small yellow or tan flower heads. The species grows at low elevations near the shore.
