= Artemisia bhutanica =

Conservation status
- Least Concern (IUCN 3.1)

Scientific classification
- Kingdom: Plantae
- Clade: Tracheophytes
- Clade: Angiosperms
- Clade: Eudicots
- Clade: Asterids
- Order: Asterales
- Family: Asteraceae
- Genus: Artemisia
- Species: A. bhutanica

Binomial name
- Artemisia bhutanica Grierson & Spring.

Species of flowering plant

Artemisia bhutanica is a species of mugwort endemic to Bhutan in the eastern Himalayas.

== Description ==
It at least grows up to 60 centimeters, and is often much taller than that. It has pale glands mixed with long dark reddish hairs. The lower inflorescence leaves are thinly covered with multiseptate hairs, the upper inflorescence is more densely covered by glandular hairs. The racemiform inflorescence branches are spreading. The flowers are bisexual, meaning that they have both male and female flowers. The achenes are ellipsoid or obovoid.

== Habitat ==
Grows in open disturbed areas between 2750 and 3850 m elevation.
