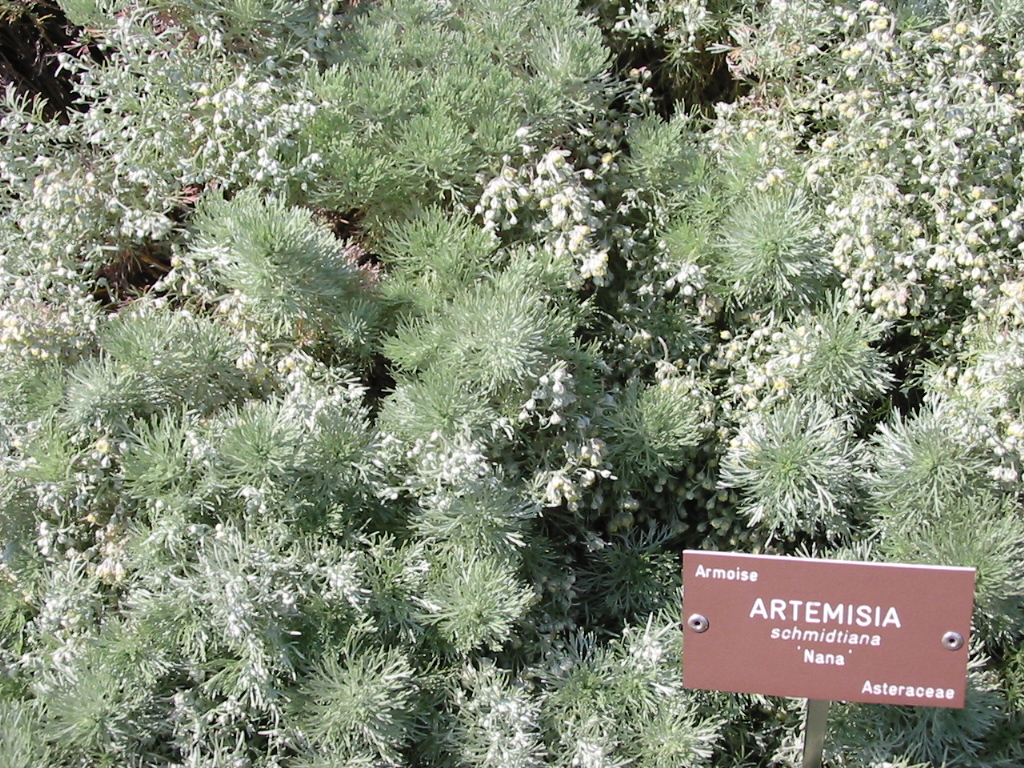
- Jardins de Callunes; Ban-de-Sapt, France

Scientific classification
- Kingdom: Plantae
- Clade: Embryophytes
- Clade: Tracheophytes
- Clade: Spermatophytes
- Clade: Angiosperms
- Clade: Eudicots
- Clade: Asterids
- Order: Asterales
- Family: Asteraceae
- Genus: Artemisia
- Species: A. schmidtiana

Binomial name
- Artemisia schmidtiana Maxim.

= Artemisia schmidtiana =

Species of flowering plant

Artemisia schmidtiana, common name silver mound, is a species of flowering plant in the family Asteraceae, native to Japan but widely cultivated as an ornamental.

== Description ==
Artemisia schmidtiana is a small, mat-forming evergreen tufted perennial growing to 30 cm, with hairy silvery leaves and panicles of small yellow flower-heads; but like many artemisias it is cultivated for its foliage rather than its flowers.

This species, and the slightly smaller cultivar 'Nana', have both gained the Royal Horticultural Society's Award of Garden Merit. It grows in USDA zone 1 to 9. It grows in full sun or partial shade in normal, sandy or clay soil. It is fragrant, has silver foliage and blooms in early summer. It attracts butterflies and is deer and rabbit resistant. It can be grown in garden beds as edging and borders, as a ground cover, in alpine and rock gardens and in containers. It grows to 25–30 cm (10–12 in) in height and 30–60 cm (12–24 in) in width. It is drought resistant and has a medium growth rate.
