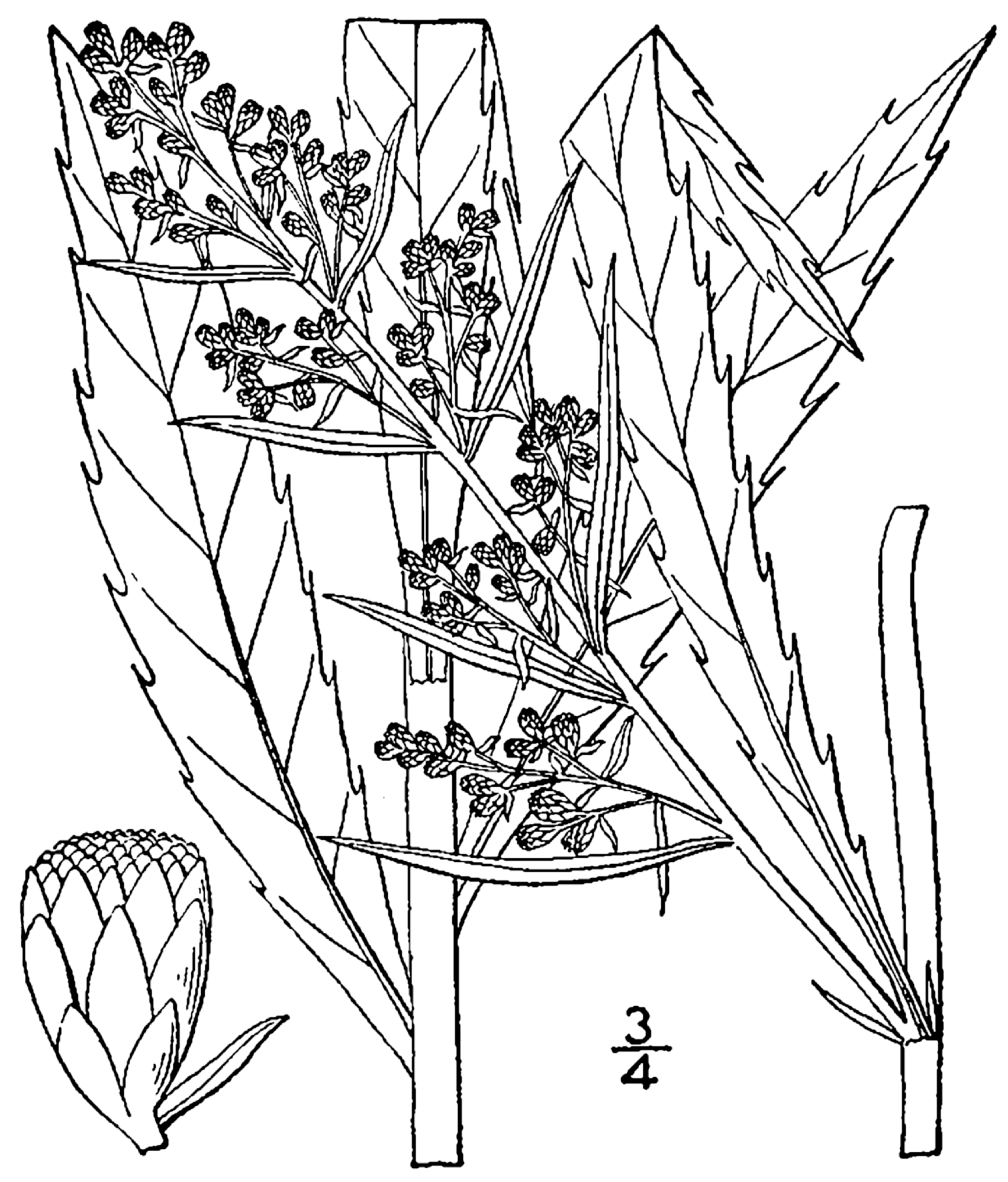

Scientific classification
- Kingdom: Plantae
- Clade: Tracheophytes
- Clade: Angiosperms
- Clade: Eudicots
- Clade: Asterids
- Order: Asterales
- Family: Asteraceae
- Genus: Artemisia
- Species: A. serrata

Binomial name
- Artemisia serrata Nutt.

Synonyms
- Artemisia vulgaris subsp. serrata (Nutt.) H.M.Hall & Clem.

= Artemisia serrata =

Species of flowering plant

Artemisia serrata is a North American species in the sunflower family, with the common name serrate-leaved sage or saw-tooth wormwood. It is native to the north-central part of the United States (Iowa, Illinois, Michigan, Wisconsin, Minnesota, North Dakota, with isolated populations in New York State).

== Description ==
Artemisia serrata is a perennial occasionally reaching a height of 300 cm (10 feet). It has up to 5 stems and bicolor leaves (white and green). It has many small yellow flower heads. The species tends to grow in grasslands and barren areas on high plateaus.
