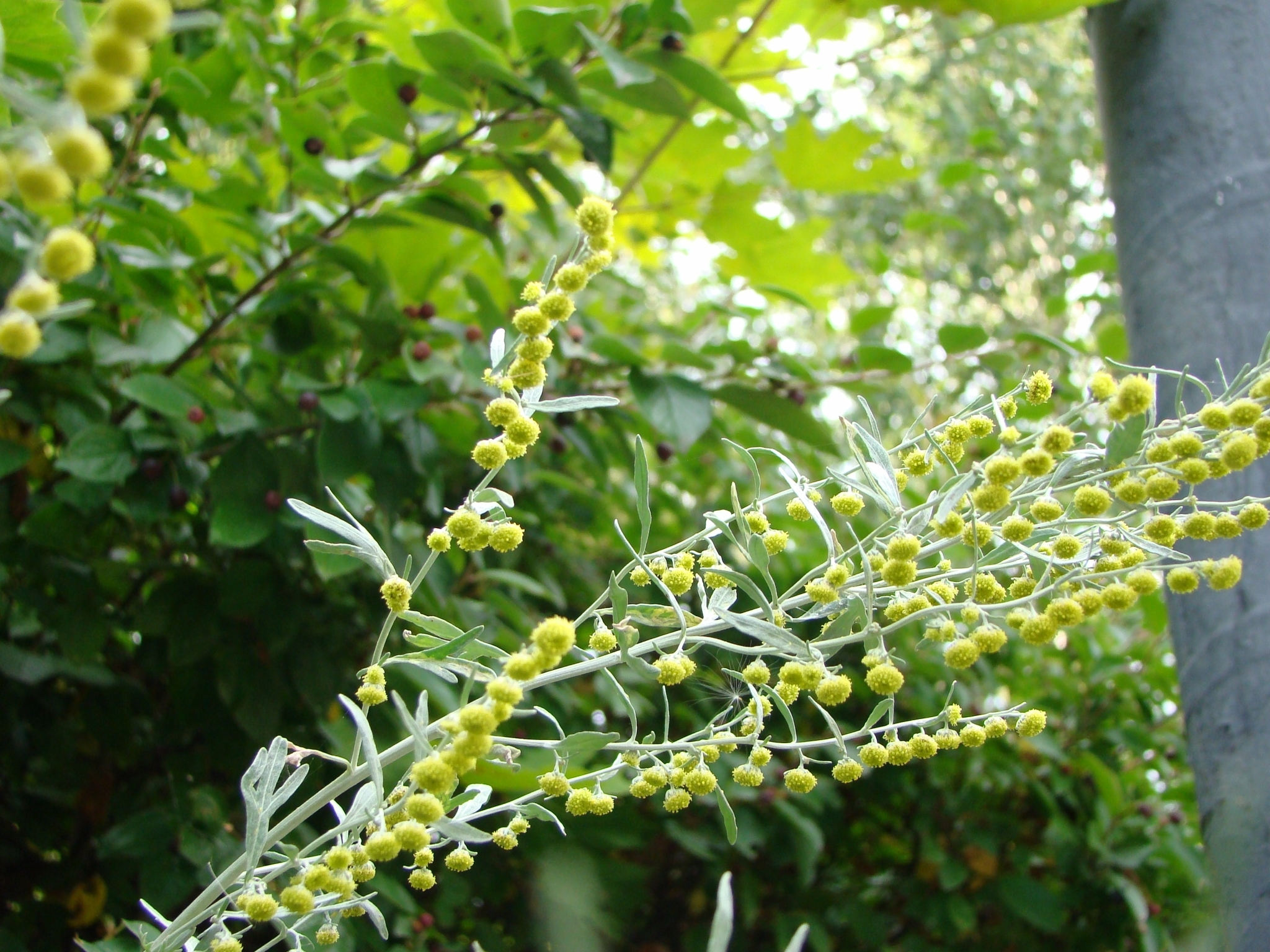

Scientific classification
- Kingdom: Plantae
- Clade: Tracheophytes
- Clade: Angiosperms
- Clade: Eudicots
- Clade: Asterids
- Order: Asterales
- Family: Asteraceae
- Genus: Artemisia
- Species: A. sieversiana

Binomial name
- Artemisia sieversiana Ehrh. ex Willd.

= Artemisia sieversiana =

Species of flowering plant

With the common name of Sievers wormwood, Artemisia sieversiana is a species of flowering plant belonging to the family Asteraceae.

Its native range is from Siberia to Afghanistan and Japan.

The National Institute for Environmental Studies (NIES) of Japan, classifies Artemisia sieversiana as an invasive species.
