= List of Artemisia species =

The following is a list of all 498 species in the plant genus Artemisia which are accepted by Plants of the World Online as of 15 June 2024.

== A ==
- Artemisia abaensis Y.R.Ling & S.Y.Zhao
- Artemisia abbreviata (Krasch. ex Korobkov) Krasnob.
- Artemisia abolinii Lazkov
- Artemisia abrotanum L.
- Artemisia absinthium L.
- Artemisia abyssinica Sch.Bip. ex Oliv. & Hiern
- Artemisia aculeata Charit.
- Artemisia adamsii Besser
- Artemisia aethiopica L.
- Artemisia aflatunensis Poljakov ex U.P.Pratov & Bakanova
- Artemisia afra Jacq. ex Willd.
- Artemisia aksaiensis Y.R.Ling
- Artemisia alata Charit.
- Artemisia alba Turra
- Artemisia albicans Sòn.Garcia, Garnatje, McArthur, Pellicer, S.C.Sand
- Artemisia albicaulis Nevski
- Artemisia aleutica Hultén
- Artemisia algeriensis Filatova
- Artemisia alpina Pall. ex Willd.
- Artemisia amoena Poljakov
- Artemisia amygdalina Decne.
- Artemisia andersiana Podlech
- Artemisia anethifolia Weber ex Stechm.
- Artemisia anethoides Mattf.
- Artemisia angustissima Nakai
- Artemisia annua L.
- Artemisia anomala S.Moore
- Artemisia aralensis Krasch.
- Artemisia araxina Takht.
- Artemisia arborescens L.
- Artemisia arbuscula Nutt.
- Artemisia arctisibirica Korobkov
- Artemisia arenaria DC.
- Artemisia arenicola Krasch. ex Poljakov
- Artemisia argentea L'Hér.
- Artemisia argyi H.Lév. & Vaniot
- Artemisia argyrophylla Ledeb.
- Artemisia armeniaca Lam.
- Artemisia aschurbajewi C.Winkl.
- Artemisia assoana Willk.
- Artemisia assurgens Filatova
- Artemisia asymmetrica Charit.
- Artemisia atlantica Coss. & Durieu
- Artemisia atrata Lam.
- Artemisia atrovirens Hand.-Mazz.
- Artemisia aucheri Boiss.
- Artemisia aurantiaca Charit.
- Artemisia aurata Kom.
- Artemisia auriculopinnata Charit.
- Artemisia australis Less.
- Artemisia austriaca Jacq.
- Artemisia austrohimalayaensis Y.R.Ling & Puri
- Artemisia austroyunnanensis Y.Ling & Y.R.Ling
- Artemisia avarica Minatul.

== B ==
- Artemisia badghysi Krasch. & Lincz. ex Poljakov
- Artemisia baimaensis Y.R.Ling & Z.C.Chuo
- Artemisia balchanorum Krasch.
- Artemisia baldshuanica Krasch. & Zopr.
- Artemisia banihalensis M.K.Kaul & S.K.Bakshi
- Artemisia bargusinensis Spreng.
- Artemisia barrelieri Besser
- Artemisia bashkalensis Kurşat & Civelek
- Artemisia baxoiensis B.H.Jiao & T.G.Gao
- Artemisia bejdemaniae Leonova
- Artemisia bhutanica Grierson & Spring.
- Artemisia bicolor Rech.f. & Wagenitz
- Artemisia biennis Willd.
- Artemisia bigelovii A.Gray
- Artemisia blepharolepis Bunge
- Artemisia borotalensis Poljakov
- Artemisia brachyloba Franch.
- Artemisia brachyphylla Kitam.
- Artemisia brevifolia Wall. ex DC.
- Artemisia × burnatii F.O.Wolf

== C ==
- Artemisia caerulescens L.
- Artemisia caespitosa Ledeb.
- Artemisia calcicola X.Q.Guo & L.Wang
- Artemisia californica Less.
- Artemisia calophylla Pamp.
- Artemisia camelorum Krasch.
- Artemisia campbellii Hook.f. & Thomson ex C.B.Clarke
- Artemisia campestris L.
- Artemisia cana Pursh
- Artemisia capillaris Thunb.
- Artemisia capitata (Nutt.) Sòn.Garcia, Garnatje, McArthur, Pellicer, S.C.Sand
- Artemisia carruthii Alph.Wood ex J.H.Carruth
- Artemisia caruifolia Buch.-Ham. ex Roxb.
- Artemisia cashemirica M.K.Kaul & S.K.Bakshi
- Artemisia cauloglabra Charit.
- Artemisia chamaemelifolia Vill.
- Artemisia chienshanica Y.Ling & W.Wang
- Artemisia chingii Pamp.
- Artemisia chitralensis Podlech
- Artemisia × christii Besse
- Artemisia cina O.Berg
- Artemisia ciniformis Krasch. & Popov ex Poljakov
- Artemisia codringtonii Rech.f.
- Artemisia comaiensis Y.Ling & Y.R.Ling
- Artemisia compacta Fisch. ex DC.
- Artemisia conferta Charit.
- Artemisia congesta Kitam.
- Artemisia constricta Sòn.Garcia, Garnatje, McArthur, Pellicer, S.C.Sand
- Artemisia copa Phil.
- Artemisia coronulata Charit.
- Artemisia crithmifolia L.
- Artemisia curvata Charit.
- Artemisia cuspidata Krasch.
- Artemisia czekanowskiana Trautv.
- Artemisia czukavinae Filatova

== D ==
- Artemisia daghestanica Krasch. & Poretzky
- Artemisia dalai-lamae Krasch.
- Artemisia davazamczii Darijma & Kamelin
- Artemisia deminutofoliata Charit.
- Artemisia demissa Krasch.
- Artemisia densiflora Viv.
- Artemisia deserti Krasch.
- Artemisia desertorum Spreng.
- Artemisia deversa Diels
- Artemisia diffusa Krasch. ex Poljakov
- Artemisia dimoana Popov
- Artemisia dipsacea Krasch.
- Artemisia disita Charit.
- Artemisia disjuncta Krasch.
- Artemisia divaricata (Pamp.) Pamp.
- Artemisia dolosa Krasch.
- Artemisia domingensis Urb.
- Artemisia douglasiana Besser
- Artemisia dracunculus L.
- Artemisia dubia Wall. ex Besser
- Artemisia dubjanskyana Krasch. ex Poljakov
- Artemisia dumosa Poljakov
- Artemisia duthreuilderhinsii Krasch.
- Artemisia dzevanovskyi Leonova

== E ==
- Artemisia echegarayi Hieron.
- Artemisia ehrendorferi (Korobkov) Kuczerov & F.J.A.Daniëls ex Chepinoga
- Artemisia elongata Filatova & Ladygina
- Artemisia emeiensis Y.R.Ling
- Artemisia eranthema Bunge
- Artemisia eremophila Krasch. & Butkov ex Poljakov
- Artemisia eriantha Ten.
- Artemisia eriocarpa Bunge
- Artemisia eriocephala Pamp.
- Artemisia eriopoda Bunge
- Artemisia estesii K.L.Chambers

== F ==
- Artemisia fauriei Nakai
- Artemisia fedorovii Rzazade
- Artemisia fedtschenkoana Krasch.
- Artemisia ferganensis Krasch. ex Poljakov
- Artemisia filatovae Kupr.
- Artemisia filifolia Torr.
- Artemisia filifoliata Charit.
- Artemisia filiformilobulata Y.R.Ling & Puri
- Artemisia finita Kitag.
- Artemisia flahaultii Emb. & Maire
- Artemisia forrestii W.W.Sm.
- Artemisia × fragosoana Font Quer
- Artemisia fragrans Willd.
- Artemisia franserioides Greene
- Artemisia freitagii Podlech
- Artemisia freyniana (Pamp.) Krasch.
- Artemisia frigida Willd.
- Artemisia fukudo Makino
- Artemisia fulgens Pamp.
- Artemisia fulvella Filatova & Ladygina
- Artemisia furcata M.Bieb.

== G ==
- Artemisia galinae Ikonn.
- Artemisia gansuensis Y.Ling & Y.R.Ling
- Artemisia genipi Stechm.
- Artemisia ghazniensis Podlech
- Artemisia ghoratensis Podlech
- Artemisia gilvescens Miq.
- Artemisia giraldii Pamp.
- Artemisia glacialis L.
- Artemisia glanduligera Krasch. ex Poljakov
- Artemisia glandulosotubulosa Charit.
- Artemisia glauca Pall. ex Willd.
- Artemisia glaucina Krasch. ex Poljak.
- Artemisia globosa Krasch.
- Artemisia globosoides Y.Ling & Y.R.Ling
- Artemisia globularia Cham. ex Besser
- Artemisia glomerata Ledeb.
- Artemisia glomerula Charit.
- Artemisia gmelinii Weber ex Stechm.
- Artemisia gongshanensis Y.R.Ling & Humphries
- Artemisia gorgonum Webb
- Artemisia gracilescens Krasch. & Iljin
- Artemisia granatensis Boiss.
- Artemisia grandis Pamp.
- Artemisia grenardii Franch.
- Artemisia gurganica (Krasch.) Filatova
- Artemisia gyangzeensis Y.Ling & Y.R.Ling
- Artemisia gyitangensis Y.Ling & Y.R.Ling
- Artemisia gypsacea Krasch., Popov & Lincz. ex Poljakov

== H ==
- Artemisia halodendron Turcz. ex Besser
- Artemisia halophila Krasch.
- Artemisia hancei (Pamp.) Y.Ling & Y.R.Ling
- Artemisia hanwulaensis Y.Z.Zhao
- Artemisia haussknechtii Boiss.
- Artemisia hedinii Ostenf.
- Artemisia heptapotamica Poljakov
- Artemisia herba-alba Asso
- Artemisia × heribaudii Sennen
- Artemisia hippolyti A.Butkov
- Artemisia hololeuca M.Bieb. ex Besser
- Artemisia huguetii Caball.
- Artemisia × hybrida F.Dvořák

== I ==
- Artemisia ifranensis J.Didier
- Artemisia igniaria Maxim.
- Artemisia implicata T.G.Leonova
- Artemisia imponens Pamp.
- Artemisia inaequifolia Sòn.Garcia, Garnatje, McArthur, Pellicer, S.C.Sand
- Artemisia incana Druce
- Artemisia incisa Pamp.
- Artemisia inculta Delile
- Artemisia indica Willd.
- Artemisia insipida Vill.
- Artemisia insularis Kitam.
- Artemisia integrifolia L.
- Artemisia issykkulensis Poljakov

== J ==
- Artemisia jacutica Drobow
- Artemisia japonica Thunb.
- Artemisia jilongensis Y.R.Ling & Humphries
- Artemisia jordanica Danin
- Artemisia judaica L.
- Artemisia juncea Kar. & Kir.

== K ==
- Artemisia kanashiroi Kitam.
- Artemisia kandaharensis Podlech
- Artemisia karatavica Krasch. & Abolin ex Poljakov
- Artemisia karavajevii Leonova
- Artemisia kasakorum (Krasch.) Pavlov
- Artemisia kaschgarica Krasch.
- Artemisia kauaiensis (Skottsb.) Skottsb.
- Artemisia kawakamii Hayata
- Artemisia keiskeana Miq.
- Artemisia kelleri Krasch.
- Artemisia kemrudica Krasch.
- Artemisia kermanensis Podlech
- Artemisia kitadakensis H.Hara & Kitam.
- Artemisia klementzae Krasch.
- Artemisia klotzschiana Besser
- Artemisia knorringiana Krasch.
- Artemisia kochiiformis Krasch. & Lincz. ex Poljakov
- Artemisia koidzumii Nakai
- Artemisia kopetdaghensis Krasch., Popov & Lincz. ex Poljakov
- Artemisia korovinii Poljakov
- Artemisia korshinskyi Krasch. ex Poljakov
- Artemisia kotuchovii Kupr.
- Artemisia kruhsiana Besser
- Artemisia kurramensis Qazilb.
- Artemisia kuschakewiczii C.Winkl.

== L ==
- Artemisia laciniata Willd.
- Artemisia lactiflora Wall. ex DC.
- Artemisia lagocephala (Fisch. ex Besser) DC.
- Artemisia lagopus Fisch. ex Besser
- Artemisia lanaticapitula X.F.Jin, Z.H.Chen & Y.F.Lu
- Artemisia lancea Vaniot
- Artemisia latifolia Ledeb.
- Artemisia ledebouriana Besser
- Artemisia lehmanniana Bunge
- Artemisia lercheana Weber ex Stechm.
- Artemisia lessingiana Besser
- Artemisia leucodes Schrenk
- Artemisia leucophylla C.B.Clarke
- Artemisia leucotricha Krasch. ex Ladygina
- Artemisia lingyeouruennii L.M.Shultz & Boufford
- Artemisia lipskyi Poljakov
- Artemisia littoricola Kitam.
- Artemisia longifolia Nutt.
- Artemisia longipetiolata Charit.
- Artemisia ludoviciana Nutt.

== M ==
- Artemisia macilenta (Maxim.) Krasch.
- Artemisia macrantha Ledeb.
- Artemisia macrocephala Jacquem. ex Besser
- Artemisia macrorhiza Turcz.
- Artemisia macrosciadia Poljakov
- Artemisia magellanica Sch.Bip.
- Artemisia mairei H.Lév.
- Artemisia manshurica (Kom.) Kom.
- Artemisia maritima L.
- Artemisia marschalliana Spreng.
- Artemisia martirensis (Wiggins) C.R.Hobbs & B.G.Baldwin
- Artemisia mattfeldii Pamp.
- Artemisia mauiensis Skottsb.
- Artemisia maximovicziana Krasch. ex Poljakov
- Artemisia medioxima Krasch. ex Poljakov
- Artemisia melanolepis Boiss.
- Artemisia mendozana DC.
- Artemisia mesatlantica Maire
- Artemisia michauxiana Besser
- Artemisia minchunensis (Y.R.Ling) ined.
- Artemisia minor Jacquem. ex Besser
- Artemisia × mixta Foucaud
- Artemisia mogoltavica Poljakov
- Artemisia molinieri Quézel, Barbero & R.J.Loisel
- Artemisia mongolica (Fisch. ex Besser) Nakai
- Artemisia mongolorum Krasch.
- Artemisia monophylla Kitam.
- Artemisia monosperma Delile
- Artemisia montana (Nakai) Pamp.
- Artemisia moorcroftiana Wall. ex DC.
- Artemisia morrisonensis Hayata
- Artemisia mucronulata Poljakov
- Artemisia mustangensis Yonek.
- Artemisia myriantha Wall. ex Besser

== N ==
- Artemisia nakaii Pamp.
- Artemisia namanganica Poljakov
- Artemisia nanschanica Krasch.
- Artemisia negrei A.Ouyahya
- Artemisia neosinensis B.H.Jiao & T.G.Gao
- Artemisia nepalensis Nees
- Artemisia nepalica Yonek.
- Artemisia nesiotica P.H.Raven
- Artemisia nigricans Filatova & Ladygina
- Artemisia niitakayamensis Hayata
- Artemisia nilagirica (C.B.Clarke) Pamp.
- Artemisia nitida Bertol.
- Artemisia nitrosa Weber ex Stechm.
- Artemisia nivalis Braun-Blanq.
- Artemisia nortonii Pamp.
- Artemisia norvegica Fr.
- Artemisia nova A.Nelson
- Artemisia nujianensis (Y.Ling & Y.R.Ling) Y.R.Ling
- Artemisia nutans Willd.
- Artemisia nuttallii (Torr. & A.Gray) Mosyakin, L.M.Shultz & G.V.Boiko

== O ==
- Artemisia obtusiloba Ledeb.
- Artemisia occidentalisichuanensis Y.R.Ling & S.Y.Zhao
- Artemisia occidentalisinensis Y.R.Ling
- Artemisia oelandica (Besser) Krasch.
- Artemisia olchonensis Leonova
- Artemisia oligocarpa Hayata
- Artemisia oliveriana J.Gay ex Besser
- Artemisia oranensis Deb. ex Filatova
- Artemisia ordosica Krasch.
- Artemisia orientalihengduangensis Y.Ling & Y.R.Ling
- Artemisia orientalixizangensis Y.R.Ling & Humphries
- Artemisia orientaliyunnanensis Y.R.Ling
- Artemisia ornithopoda Charit.
- Artemisia oxycephala Kitag.

== P ==
- Artemisia packardiae J.W.Grimes & Ertter
- Artemisia pallens Wall. ex Besser
- Artemisia palmeri A.Gray
- Artemisia palustris L.
- Artemisia pancicii Ronniger ex Danihelka & Marhold
- Artemisia pannosa Krasch.
- Artemisia papposa S.F.Blake & Cronquist
- Artemisia parviflora Roxb. ex D.Don
- Artemisia pauciflora Weber ex Stechmann
- Artemisia pedatifida Nutt.
- Artemisia pedemontana Balb.
- Artemisia pedunculosa Miq.
- Artemisia pengchuoensis Y.R.Ling & S.Y.Zhao
- Artemisia persica Boiss.
- Artemisia pewzowi C.Winkl.
- Artemisia phaeolepis Krasch.
- Artemisia phyllobotrys (Hand.-Mazz.) Y.Ling & Y.R.Ling
- Artemisia pineticola Kupr.
- Artemisia polybotryoidea Y.R.Ling
- Artemisia pontica L.
- Artemisia porrecta Krasch. ex Poljakov
- Artemisia porteri Cronquist
- Artemisia potentilloides A.Gray
- Artemisia prattii (Pamp.) Y.Ling & Y.R.Ling
- Artemisia princeps Pamp.
- Artemisia pringlei Greenm.
- Artemisia prolixa Krasch. ex Poljakov
- Artemisia przewalskii Krasch.
- Artemisia pubescens Ledeb.
- Artemisia punctigera Krasch. ex Poljakov
- Artemisia pycnocephala (Less.) DC.
- Artemisia pycnorrhiza Ledeb.
- Artemisia pygmaea A.Gray

== Q ==
- Artemisia qingheensis G.Z.Jin
- Artemisia qinlingensis Y.Ling & Y.R.Ling
- Artemisia quettensis Podlech
- Artemisia quinqueloba Trautv.

== R ==
- Artemisia radicans Kupr.
- Artemisia ramosa C.Sm. ex Link
- Artemisia remosa Sugaw.
- Artemisia remotiloba Krasch. ex Poljakov
- Artemisia reptans C.Sm.
- Artemisia rhodantha Rupr.
- Artemisia richardsoniana Besser
- Artemisia rigida (Nutt.) A.Gray
- Artemisia robusta (Pamp.) Y.Ling & Y.R.Ling
- Artemisia rosthornii Pamp.
- Artemisia rothrockii A.Gray
- Artemisia roxburghiana Besser
- Artemisia rubripes Nakai
- Artemisia rupestris L.
- Artemisia ruthiae (A.H.Holmgren, L.M.Shultz & Lowrey) Sòn.Garcia, Garnatje, McArthur, Pellicer, S.C.Sand
- Artemisia rutifolia Stephan ex Spreng.

== S ==
- Artemisia saharae Pomel
- Artemisia saissanica (Krasch.) Filatova
- Artemisia saitoana Kitam.
- Artemisia salsoloides Willd.
- Artemisia samoiedorum Pamp.
- Artemisia santolina Schrenk
- Artemisia santonicum L.
- Artemisia saposhnikovii Krasch. ex Poljakov
- Artemisia saurensis Kupr.
- Artemisia sawanensis (Y.R.Ling & Humphries) ined.
- Artemisia schimperi Sch.Bip. ex Engl.
- Artemisia schmidtiana Maxim.
- Artemisia schrenkiana Ledeb.
- Artemisia scoparia Waldst. & Kit.
- Artemisia scopiformis Ledeb.
- Artemisia scopulorum A.Gray
- Artemisia scotina Nevski
- Artemisia selengensis Turcz. ex Besser
- Artemisia semiarida (Krasch. & Lavrenko) Filatova
- Artemisia senjavinensis Besser
- Artemisia sericea (Besser) Weber ex Stechm.
- Artemisia serrata Nutt.
- Artemisia shangnanensis Y.Ling & Y.R.Ling
- Artemisia shennongjiaensis Y.Ling & Y.R.Ling
- Artemisia sichuanensis Y.Ling & Y.R.Ling
- Artemisia sieberi Besser
- Artemisia sieversiana Ehrh. ex Willd.
- Artemisia simplex (A.Nelson) Sòn.Garcia, Garnatje, McArthur, Pellicer, S.C.Sand
- Artemisia simulans Pamp.
- Artemisia sinanensis Y.Yabe
- Artemisia skorniakovii C.Winkl.
- Artemisia smithii Mattf.
- Artemisia sodiroi Hieron.
- Artemisia somae Hayata
- Artemisia songarica Schrenk ex Fisch. & C.A.Mey.
- Artemisia speciosa (Pamp.) Y.Ling & Y.R.Ling
- Artemisia sphaerocephala Krasch.
- Artemisia spiciformis Osterh.
- Artemisia spicigera K.Koch
- Artemisia spinescens D.C.Eaton
- Artemisia splendens Willd.
- Artemisia stechmanniana Besser
- Artemisia stelleriana Besser
- Artemisia stenocephala Krasch. ex Poljakov
- Artemisia stipularis Urb. & Ekman
- Artemisia stracheyi Hook.f. & Thomson ex C.B.Clarke
- Artemisia stricta Edgew.
- Artemisia subarctica Krasch.
- Artemisia subchrysolepis Filatova
- Artemisia sublessingiana (B.Keller) Krasch. ex Poljakov
- Artemisia subsalsa Filatova
- Artemisia × subsericea (Jord. & Fourr.) Rouy
- Artemisia subulata Nakai
- Artemisia succulenta Ledeb.
- Artemisia succulentoides Y.Ling & Y.R.Ling
- Artemisia suksdorfii Piper
- Artemisia swatensis Podlech
- Artemisia sylvatica Maxim.
- Artemisia szowitziana (Besser) Grossh.

== T ==
- Artemisia tafelii Mattf.
- Artemisia tainingensis Hand.-Mazz.
- Artemisia tanacetifolia L.
- Artemisia tangutica Pamp.
- Artemisia taurica Willd.
- Artemisia tecti-mundi Podlech
- Artemisia tenuisecta Nevski
- Artemisia terrae-albae Krasch.
- Artemisia thellungiana Pamp.
- Artemisia thomsoniana (C.B.Clarke) Filatova
- Artemisia thuscula Cav.
- Artemisia tianschanica Krasch. ex Poljakov
- Artemisia tilesii Ledeb.
- Artemisia tilhoana Quézel
- Artemisia tomentella Trautv.
- Artemisia tournefortiana Rchb.
- Artemisia transbaicalensis Leonova
- Artemisia transiliensis Poljakov
- Artemisia trautvetteriana Besser
- Artemisia tridactyla Hand.-Mazz.
- Artemisia tridentata Nutt.
- Artemisia tripartita Rydb.
- Artemisia tsugitakaensis (Kitam.) Y.Ling & Y.R.Ling
- Artemisia tukuchaensis Kitam.
- Artemisia turanica Krasch.
- Artemisia turcomanica Gand.

== U ==
- Artemisia umbelliformis Lam.
- Artemisia umbrosa (Besser) Turcz. ex Verl.

== V ==
- Artemisia vachanica Krasch. ex Poljakov
- Artemisia valida Krasch. ex Poljakov
- Artemisia vallesiaca All.
- Artemisia velutina Pamp.
- Artemisia verbenacea (Kom.) Kitag.
- Artemisia verlotiorum Lamotte
- Artemisia vestita Wall. ex Besser
- Artemisia vexans Pamp.
- Artemisia viridis Willd. ex DC.
- Artemisia viridisquama Kitam.
- Artemisia viridissima (Kom.) Pamp.
- Artemisia viscida Pamp.
- Artemisia viscidissima Y.Ling & Y.R.Ling
- Artemisia vulgaris L.

== W ==
- Artemisia waltonii J.R.Drumm. ex Pamp.
- Artemisia × wolfii Petitm.
- Artemisia woodii (Neilson) C.W.Riggins
- Artemisia wudanica Liou & W.Wang
- Artemisia × wurzellii C.M.James & Stace

== X ==
- Artemisia xanthochroa Krasch.
- Artemisia xerophytica Krasch.
- Artemisia xigazeensis Y.R.Ling & M.G.Gilbert

== Y ==
- Artemisia yadongensis Y.Ling & Y.R.Ling
- Artemisia yamadae (Kitam.) Hideki Takah. & Barkalov
- Artemisia yongii Y.R.Ling
- Artemisia younghusbandii J.R.Drumm. ex Pamp.
- Artemisia yunnanensis Jeffrey

== Z ==
- Artemisia zayuensis Y.Ling & Y.R.Ling
- Artemisia zhongdianensis Y.R.Ling
