= Alaskana =

Alaskana is a Neo-Latin term meaning of Alaska, used in taxonomy to denote species indigenous to or strongly associated with Alaska.

== Fungi ==
- Arthrobotrys alaskana, a mitosporic fungus in the family Orbiliaceae
- Fuscopannaria alaskana, a lichenized fungus in the family Pannariaceae
- Urocystis alaskana, a smut fungus in the family Urocystidiaceae
- Xanthoria alaskana, a lichenized fungus in the family Teloschistaceae

== Sea snails ==
- Leptogyra alaskana, a sea snail in the family Melanodrymiidae
- Onoba alaskana, a minute sea snail in the family Rissoidae
- Setia alaskana, a minute sea snail in the family Rissoidae
- Turbonilla alaskana, a species of sea snail in the family Pyramidellidae

== Other ==
- Androsace alaskana, a flowering plant in the family Primulaceae
- Artemisia alaskana, a North American species of plants in the sunflower family
- Caprella alaskana, a skeleton shrimp in the family Caprellidae
- Isotoma alaskana, a springtail in the family Isotomidae
- Lyonsiella alaskana, a saltwater clam in the family Verticordiidae
- Phyllonorycter alaskana, a moth of the family Gracillariidae
- Rhynchelmis alaskana, a microdrile oligochaete in the family Lumbriculida
- Stellaria alaskana, a flowering plant in the family Caryophyllaceae

== Synonyms ==
- Sorbus alaskana, synonym of Sorbus scopulina, a species of rowan that is native to western North America
- Volutomitra alaskana, synonym of Volutomitra groenlandica, a sea snail in the family Volutomitridae

== See also ==
- Acer alaskense
