= Santonica =

Santonica may refer to:

- Santonica, the common name for a plant (Artemisia cina)
- Santonin, a drug formerly used to expel intestinal worms
