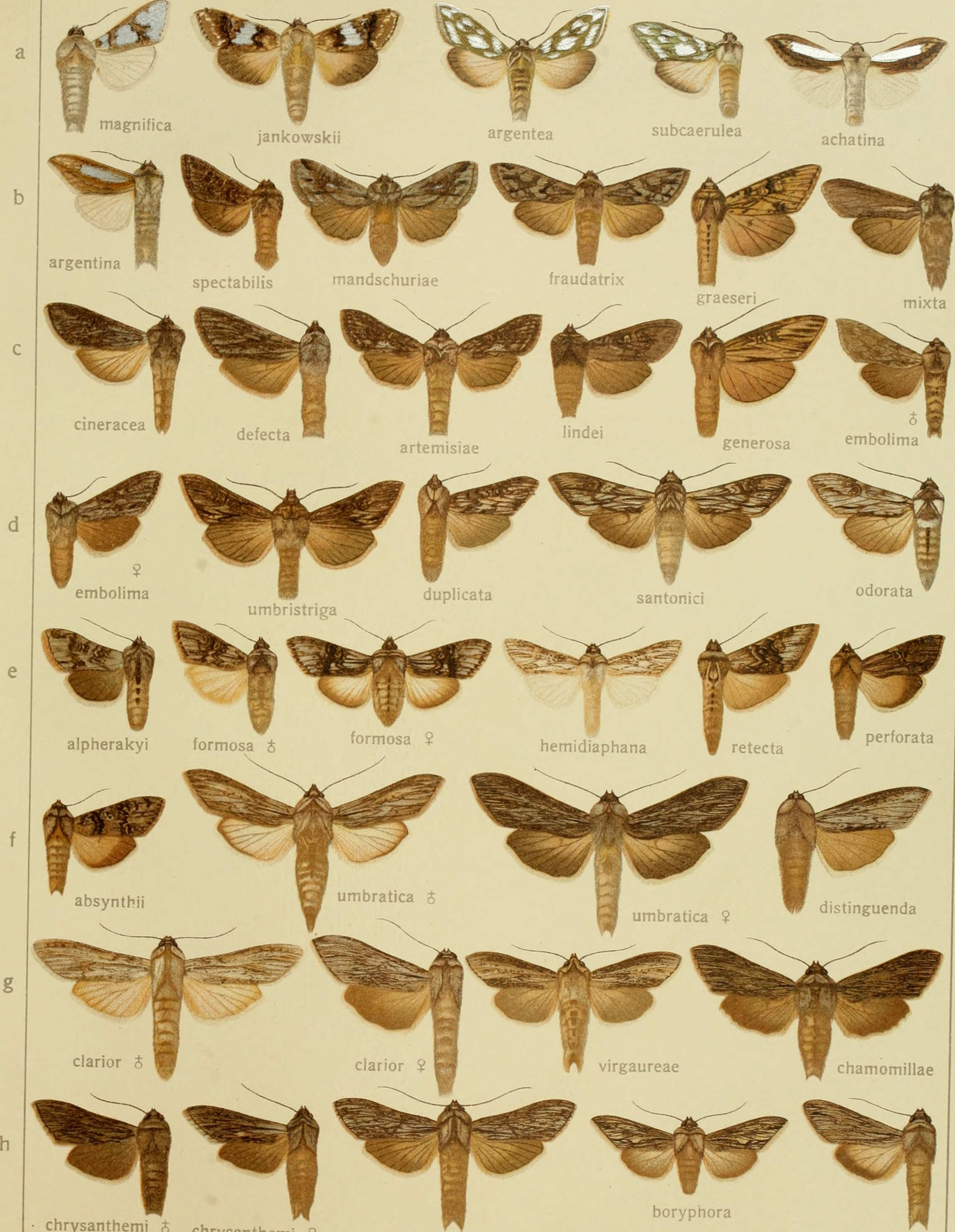

Scientific classification
- Kingdom: Animalia
- Phylum: Arthropoda
- Clade: Pancrustacea
- Class: Insecta
- Order: Lepidoptera
- Superfamily: Noctuoidea
- Family: Noctuidae
- Genus: Cucullia
- Species: C. santolinae

Binomial name
- Cucullia santolinae Rambur, 1834

= Cucullia santolinae =

Species of moth

Cucullia santolinae is a moth of the family Noctuidae. It is found in southern Europe, northern Africa, Turkey, the Caucasus region and Israel.

Warren (1914) states : C. santolinae Rambur (= wredowi Costa) (27 c). Like lactucae Cucullia lactucae but smaller and with narrower wings; characterised by the whitish patch in the region of the stigmata and a whitish blotch between the inner and outer lines on submedian fold; veins and a submedian streak finely black; a curved dark streak below end of cell represents the reniform stigma : a black streak above vein 4 and a shorter one below vein 2 before termen; hindwing uniformly brown. A South European species found in S. France, Switzerland, Andalusia, Corsica, Italy and Algeria — Larva dirty green or reddish, with some white spots representing the dorsal line; on each segment at the sides some violet streaks; venter pale with black wavy lines; head pale; feeds on Artemisia arborea.

Adults are on wing from December to January. There is one generation per year.

The larvae feed on the flowers and seeds of Artemisia arborea and Artemisia campestris. Host plants: larvae In the Levant they probably feed on Artemisia monosperma.
