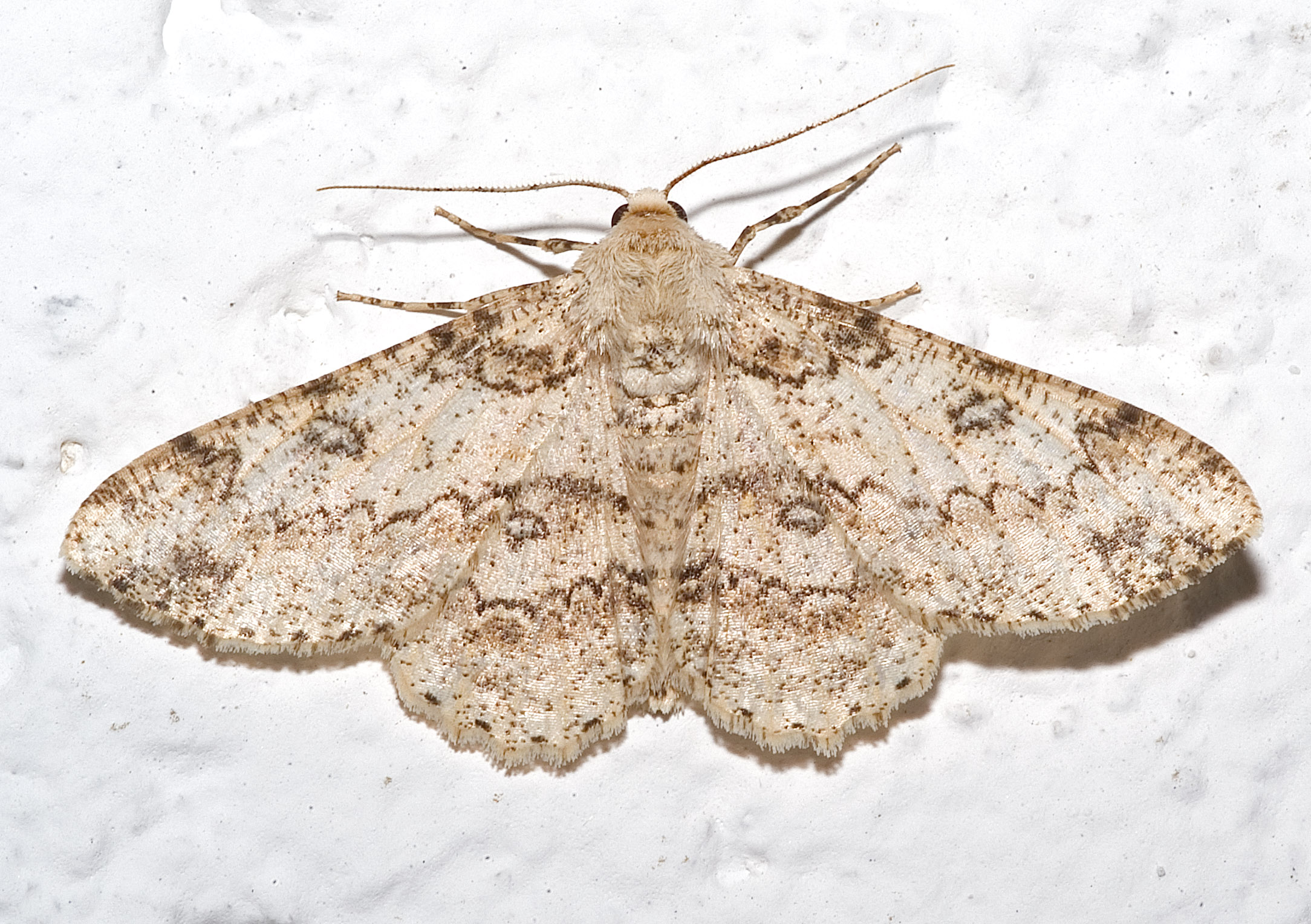

Scientific classification
- Domain: Eukaryota
- Kingdom: Animalia
- Phylum: Arthropoda
- Class: Insecta
- Order: Lepidoptera
- Family: Geometridae
- Subfamily: Ennominae
- Tribe: Boarmiini
- Genus: Ascotis
- Species: A. selenaria

Binomial name
- Ascotis selenaria (Denis & Schiffermüller, 1775)

Synonyms
- Boarmia selenaria Schiffermiller

= Ascotis selenaria =

Species of moth

Ascotis selenaria, the giant looper, is a moth of the family Geometridae. The species was first described by Michael Denis and Ignaz Schiffermüller in 1775.

== Subspecies ==
- Ascotis selenaria dianaria (Hübner, 1817)
- Ascotis selenaria selenaria (Denis & Schiffermüller, 1775)
- Ascotis selenaria artemis Staudinger, 1897
- Ascotis selenaria cretacea (Butler, 1879)
- Ascotis selenaria reciprocaria (Walker)
- Ascotis selenaria imparata (Walker)

== Description ==
Ascotis selenaria has a wingspan of 38–48 mm. The front wings are characterized by a yellowish-white ground color, with numerous dark grey markings and two brownish sharply toothed transverse lines. The front and rear wings show distinctive moon shaped spots. The color and pattern of the caterpillars vary from green to yellow/green or brown resembling twigs. They have a characteristic bulbous swelling on the thorax and move with a looping motion as usual in measuring worms.

The giant looper has two generations per year in southern Europe, flying from April to May and from July to August. However, further North it's possible that they only fly in one generation. They are attracted to light. The caterpillars can be found from September to October (first generation) and in June and July (second generation). If only one generation is present because of climate conditions, the moths fly from late June to early August, and the caterpillars can be encountered from August to September. The moths are nocturnal.

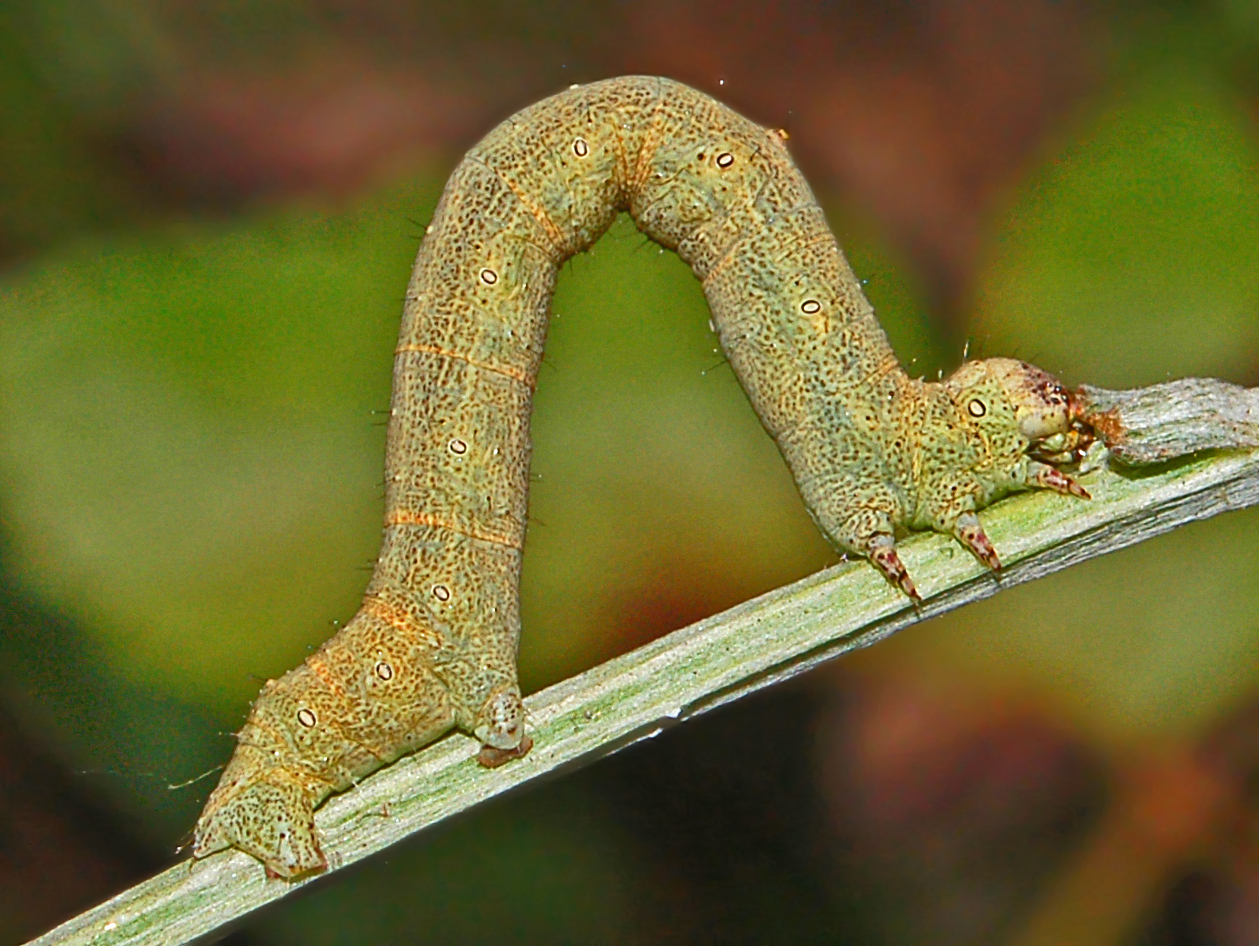
Caterpillar of Ascotis selenaria

The caterpillars reach a length up to 55 millimeters. They are polyphagous, feeding mainly on field wormwood (Artemisia campestris), Sambucus sp., rose ( Rosa sp.), blackberry (Rubus fruticosus), broom (Cytisus scoparius), Taraxacum sp., birch (Betula sp.), Arbutus sp., Pimpinella sp., clover (Melilotus sp.), cypress spurge ( Euphorbia sp.), acacia (Mimosa longifolia), Mimosa dealbata, Salvia sp. and Salix glabra. In India, the pest has been reported to infest on prosopis (Prosopis juliflora), Delonix regia and sal (Shorea robusta). A nucleopolyhedrovirus suppressing population of Ascotis seleneria has been reported in India. In many areas they are considered a pest causing serious damages to agriculture. They pupate and overwinter in the soil.

== Distribution ==
This species is distributed in Southern Europe from Spain and western Mediterranean through the Balkans, in Central Europe, in Eastern Europe up to the Ural mountains, Africa, Anatolia from the Caucasus Mountains up to Altai Mountains, Korea and Japan. It is also reported from India from Dehra Dun in the north and Coimbatore in the south. It has also been found once in Öland, Sweden in 2019 and a couple of times in Denmark after 2022, mostly on Bornholm.

== Habitat ==
These moths prefer rocky slopes, bushy forest edges and sandy pine forests.
