= Wormseed =

Wormseed is a common name for several plants and may refer to:

- Dysphania anthelmintica (syn. Chenopodium ambrosioides var. anthelminticum), American wormseed, a medicinal herb from Central and South America, sometimes included in
  - Dysphania ambrosioides (syn. Chenopodium ambrosioides), Mexican wormseed, Mexican tea, or epazote, a medicinal herb from Mexico and Central and South America
- Artemisia cina, commonly known as santonica (zahr el shieh el -khorasani), Levant wormseed, and wormseed, an Asian species of herbaceous perennial in the daisy family
