= Artemisia violacea =

Artemisia violacea may refer to two different taxa of plants:

- Artemisia violacea Ledeb, a taxonomic synonym for northern wormwood (Artemisia campestris subsp. borealis)
- Artemisia violacea Desf., a taxonomic synonym for common mugwort (Artemisia vulgaris)
