= Bucculatrix laciniatella =

Scientific classification
- Kingdom: Animalia
- Phylum: Arthropoda
- Clade: Pancrustacea
- Class: Insecta
- Order: Lepidoptera
- Family: Bucculatricidae
- Genus: Bucculatrix
- Species: B. laciniatella

Binomial name
- Bucculatrix laciniatella Benander, 1931

Species of moth

Bucculatrix laciniatella is a moth in the family Bucculatricidae. It was described by Per Benander in 1931. It is found from Sweden and the southern part of European Russia to Japan (Honshu).

The wingspan is 6–8 mm. Adults are on wing from May to July.

The larvae feed on Artemisia oelandica and Artemisia laciniata. They mine the leaves of their host plant. Larvae can be found in May.
