= Santonin =

Drug used to expel parasitic worms by paralyzing them

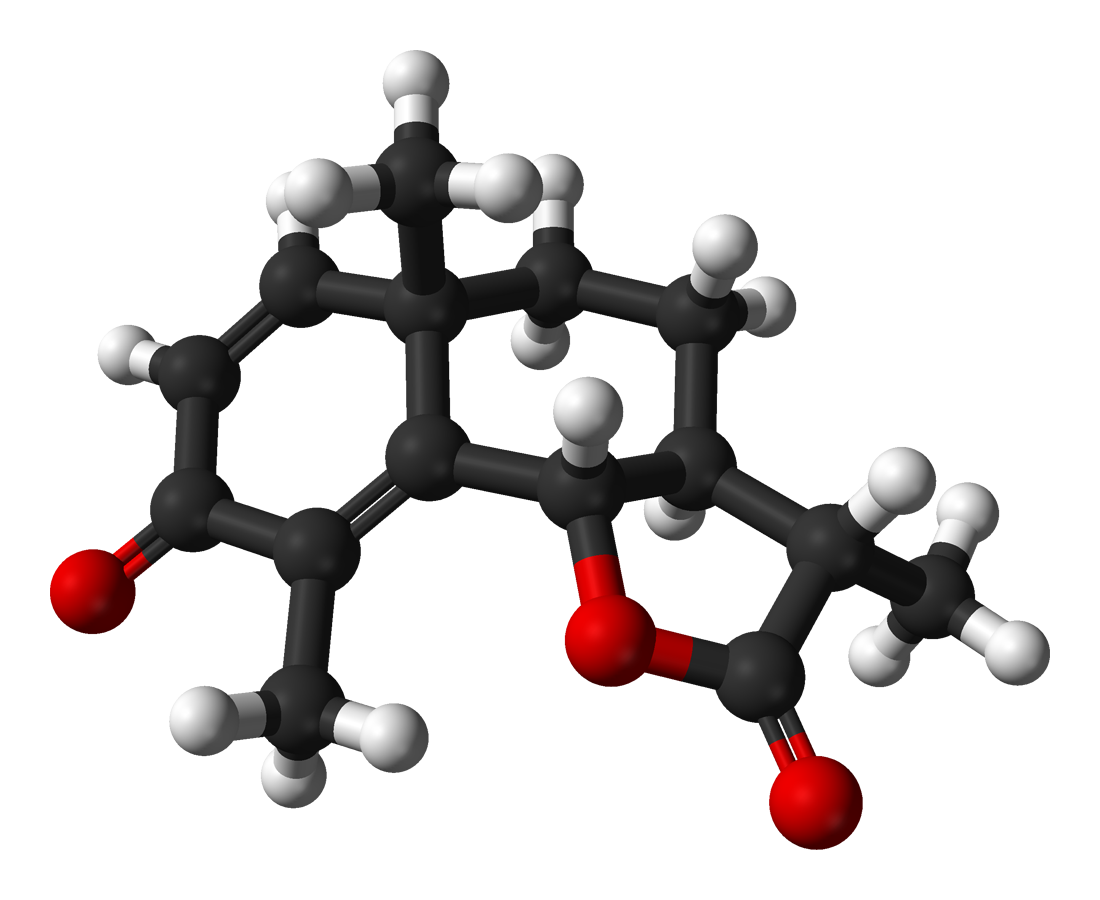

Names
- IUPAC name (11S)-6α,12-Epoxyeudesma-1,4-diene-3,12-dione
- Systematic IUPAC name (3S,3aS,5aS,9bS)-3,5a,9-Trimethyl-3a,5,5a,9b-tetrahydronaphtho[1,2-b]furan-2,8(3H,4H)-dione

Identifiers
CAS Number	481-06-1
3D model (JSmol)	Interactive image
ChEBI	CHEBI:16363
ChEMBL	ChEMBL259254
ChemSpider	191779
ECHA InfoCard	100.006.874
KEGG	D00154; C02206
PubChem CID	221071
UNII	1VL8J38ERO
CompTox Dashboard (EPA)	DTXSID7045312
- InChI: InChI=1S/C15H18O3/c1-8-10-4-6-15(3)7-5-11(16)9(2)12(15)13(10)18-14(8)17/h5,7-8,10,13H,4,6H2,1-3H3/t8-,10-,13-,15-/m0/s1 Key: XJHDMGJURBVLLE-BOCCBSBMSA-N
- SMILES: C[C@H]1[C@@H]2CC[C@]3(C=CC(=O)C(=C3[C@H]2OC1=O)C)C

Properties
Chemical formula	C_{15}H_{18}O_{3}
Molar mass	246.30162
Melting point	172 °C (342 °F; 445 K)
Boiling point	423 °C (793 °F; 696 K)
Solubility in water	insoluble
Vapor pressure	1*10^{−7}mmHg

Hazards
Flash point	190 °C (374 °F; 463 K)
- Except where otherwise noted, data are given for materials in their standard state (at 25 °C [77 °F], 100 kPa). verify (what is ?) Infobox references

Santonin is a drug which was widely used in the past as an anthelminthic. It is a terpenoid and an organic compound consisting of colorless flat prisms, turning slightly yellow from the action of light and soluble in alcohol, chloroform and boiling water.

According to the US Pharmacopoeia, santonin occurs "in colorless, shining, flattened, prismatic crystals, odorless and nearly tasteless when first put in the mouth, but afterward developing a bitter taste; not altered by exposure to air, but turning yellow on exposure to light. Nearly insoluble in cold water; soluble in 40 parts of alcohol at 15 °C. (59 °F.), in 250 parts of boiling water, and in 8 parts of boiling alcohol; also soluble in 140 parts of ether, in 4 parts of chloroform, and in solutions of caustic alkalies. When heated to 170 °C. (338 °F.), santonin melts, and forms, if rapidly cooled, an amorphous mass, which instantly crystallizes on coming in contact with a minute quantity of one of its solvents. At a higher temperature, it sublimes partly unchanged, and, when ignited, it is consumed, leaving no residue. Santonin is neutral to litmus paper moistened with alcohol. Santonin yields, with an alcoholic solution of potassium hydroxide, a bright pinkish-red liquid, which gradually becomes colorless. From its solution in caustic alkalies, santonin is completely precipitated by supersaturation with an acid".

== Isolation ==
It is derived from santonica (the unexpanded flower-heads of Artemisia maritima var. stechmanniana). Others refer to A. cina or A. chamaemelifolia as being the derivative species.

The determination of the structure of santonin was the subject of intense early work. The initial photoproduct obtained from santonin is lumisantonin. In this rearrangement, the C-3 carbonyl group moves to C-2, the C-4 methyl moves to C-1, and the C-10 carbon inverts.

== Anthelminthic use ==
Santonin paralyzes parasitic worms (helminths), allowing them to be passed out of the body. Santonin has the effect of paralyzing the anterior (front) end of the worm, while having a stimulant effect on the posterior end, depending on the concentration. Because of this, the worm cannot coordinate itself, and loses its ability to maintain its position in the host. By using a purgative, the worm can easily be passed out. Experiments in the 1880s showed that even after 40 hours, santonin had no lethal effect on roundworms using a saturated solution in dilute alkali.

Santonin was formerly listed in U.S. and British pharmacopoeia, but it has fallen out of use with the development of safer ascaricides and is no longer registered as a drug in most countries.

== Reactions and properties ==
Santonin can be converted to santonic acid (C_{15}H_{20}O_{4}) via based-catalyzed hydrolysis followed by a multistep rearrangement process.

Santonin dissolves in alkalies with formation of salts of this carboxylic acid. Santonin, in acetic acid solution, when exposed to sunlight for about a month, is converted into (colorless) photosantonic acid (C_{15}H_{22}O_{5}) which is generally regarded as less toxic. The ethyl ester of the latter is obtained when an alcoholic solution of santonin is exposed to sunlight (Sestini). A yellow coloration is developed upon exposure of santonin to light. Santonin is optically levorotatory.

== Proposed biosynthesis ==
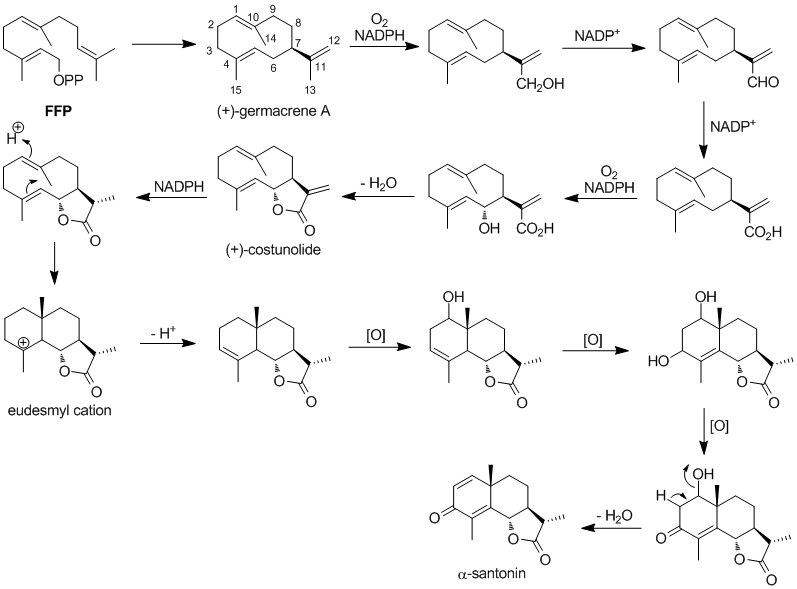
Figure 1. Proposed Mechanistic Biosynthesis of α-santonin

The full biosynthesis of α-santonin has not been elucidated but α-santonin bears much similarity to parthenolide. The proposed biosynthesis begins with the cyclization of farnesyl diphosphate (FPP) to (+)-germacrene A by a sesquiterpene synthase. (+)-germacrene A hydroxylase then hydroxylates the isopropenyl side chain. The oxidation of germacratrien-12-ol to germacratrien-12-oic acid via the intermediate germacratrien-12-al is done by NADP^{+}-dependent dehydrogenase(s). Germacratrien-12-oic acid is then hydroxylated at C6 subsequently followed by lactonization forming (+)-costunolide.

It was proposed that the methylene of (+)-costunolide is reduced before the second ring closure. The bicyclic decalin ring system is formed via the eudesmyl cation followed by hydroxylation at C1. Further oxidation at C3 forms the β-ketohydroxyl which upon elimination of H_{2}O completes the proposed biosynthetic pathway of α-santonin.

=== Photochemistry ===
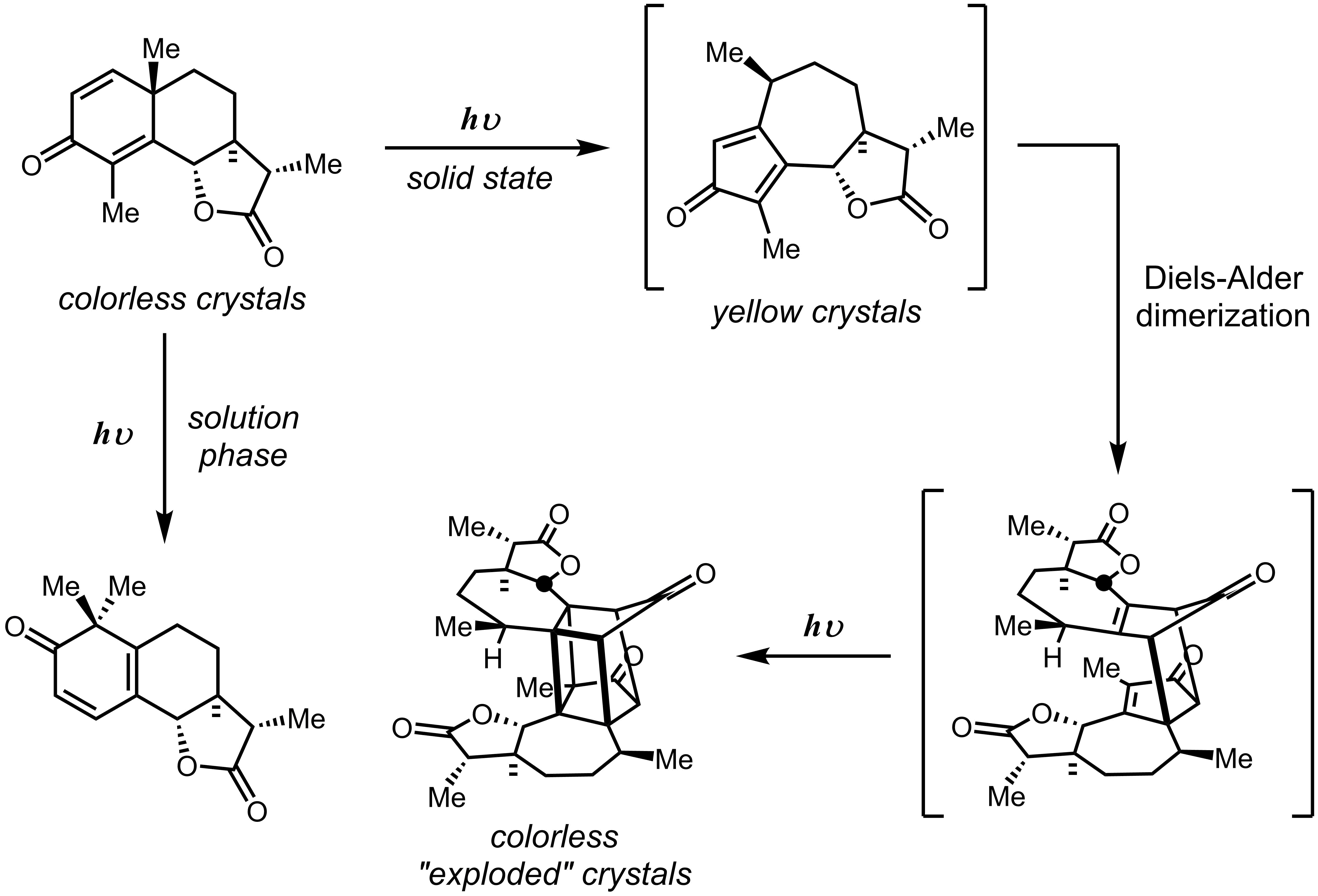
Exposure of α-santonin to light results in a complex photochemical cascade.

The chemistry of α-santonin upon exposure to sunlight has the distinction of being the first reported organic photochemical reaction. Trommsdorff reported in 1834 that crystals of α-santonin first turned yellow upon exposure to sunlight before "exploding". The product of this solid-phase reaction was identified by Matsuura in 1968 as the product of photorearrangement, followed by a lattice-controlled Diels–Alder reaction and [2+2]-photocycloaddition. On the other hand, exposure to light in the solution phase results in the formation of monomeric skeletal rearrangement products. The mechanism of the photodimerization has been investigated in detail.

== Historical pharmacological use ==
Santonin was developed in the 1830s by German chemists by extracting the chemical from Artemisia cina, a plant from Turkmenistan. At the time Artemisia was often used as an antihelminthic remedy, and as a perennial it was widely accessible. A common remedy at the time used an infusion of 5–10 g herb in 500 ml water. Castor oil could be used to help the expulsion process. It was reported that by 1843 candy lozenges were available in Germany which contained santonin.

Santonin was used from the mid-19th century to the 1950s as an anthelminthic, typically administered with a purgative. Santonin was used in treatment of infestation by the roundworm Ascaris lumbricoides and in ascarid parasitoses in general (including threadworm parasitosis). It is ineffective in treatment of tapeworm infestation.

Santonin was often found as a major ingredient of patent remedies for intestinal worms. It was sold in numerous formulations with varying degrees of effectiveness, such as worm lozenges, powders, syrups, and tonics.

It was reported by an official of the Eastern & Russian Trading Company that during 1926, Japanese manufacturers were mixing santonin into nearly all pastry, confections, and tonics as part of a government-sponsored effort to eradicate intestinal parasites; Japan at the time imported five tons of santonin from Russia annually.

Encyclopædia Britannica (1911) notes that the typical dose was 2 to 5 grams. (This was a total dose; many regimens called for three doses daily over three days, and the "three teaspoons three times a day for three days" regimen was typical around the 1950s when use of santonin was starting to wane; actual doses per dose were closer to 20–30 milligrams per adult dose in a typical "'50s regimen", but "one-shot" doses of santonin (especially via suppository) were common in the late 19th century–early 20th century.) The only formerly registered British preparation (as of 1911) was the "trochiscus santonini" (santonin lozenge), but the preparation "sodii santoninas" (soda of santonin) was also formerly listed as an official preparation in the U.S. Pharmacopoeia. Commercial preparations containing santonin (usually containing a purgative laxative as well) also appeared in US drug formularies as late as the 1950s; the Modern Drug Encyclopedia and Therapeutic Index of 1955 listed Lumbricide (produced by Massengill) and a generic santonin preparation made by Winthrop-Stearns (now Winthrop-Sanofi).

Santonin also was used in a lesser extent in treatment of atony of the bladder. This usage largely dropped off after the early 20th century.

Dosage forms varied for santonin; in the 19th–20th centuries, santonin lozenges or suppositories designed for single-dosage treatment of ascarid infestation were the typical form of treatment, whilst in the 1950s the two remaining santonin preparations on the market in the United States were liquid medications.

== Hazards and difficulty of use of santonin ==
Santonin was an agent that (compared to more modern anthelminthic drugs) was very complicated to use and entailed rather serious risk to the patient. Nearly every formulary and herbal which lists santonin or santonin-containing plants lists the real risk of yellow vision and of fatal reactions; even small doses of santonin cause disturbances of vision, usually yellow vision or perhaps green (xanthopsia or chromatopsia). The Encyclopædia Britannica noted:

...These effects usually pass off in a few days. Large doses, however, produce toxic effects, aphasia, muscular tremors and epileptiform convulsions, and the disturbances of vision may go on to total blindness.

At least one modern herbal has also noted these same severe side effects of santonin.

Even were it not for the fact that santonin is among the most toxic of herbal anthelminthic drugs, deworming using santonin is complicated in comparison to more modern anthelminthics. Typically, santonin must be taken whilst fasting completely (both before and after taking the drug) for "single dose" regimens or on a full stomach with all fats and oils in the diet being avoided for 2–3 days before treatment as well as during treatment and 2–3 days afterwards (due to santonin being fat soluble and having an increased risk of side effects); after a course of santonin, a purgative must be given to cleanse the body of the dead worms. (The two remaining registered santonin preparations in the United States as of 1955 were in fact santonin/purgative combinations; Lumbricide contained santonin and senna (among other ingredients) and the Winthrop-Stearns generic preparation was a santonin/cascara sagrada combination drug.)

Due to the severe side effects (even when used as directed), the need for a purgative, and the development of many safer deworming drugs, santonin has largely fallen out of use. Typically mebendazole and pyrantel pamoate are used in modern pharmacopoeia practice where santonin was formerly used; even guides on holistic medicine strongly recommend avoiding the use of santonin due to its severe and occasionally fatal side effects and the availability of far safer anthelminthics. The Council Directive 65/65 European Economic Community (EEC) (in regards to pharmaceuticals and naturopathic preparations) has officially ruled santonin preparations to have an "unacceptable" risk-benefit ratio and preparations containing santonin are no longer eligible for registration in EU countries.

== Santonin and absinthe ==
While absinthe is certainly more infamous for its content of thujone, the liquor does also contain small amounts of santonin . It has been speculated by some parties that Impressionist art—in particular, Van Gogh's artwork—may have been inspired not by thujone and its presumed psychotropic effects, but on the "yellow vision" or xanthopsia which is a known side effect of santonin. This has been disputed, however, most notably by Arnold and Loftus (1991) who have noted the santonin content would have been insufficient to cause xanthopsia.

== See also ==
- Artemisin, a hydroxylated derivative of santonin
