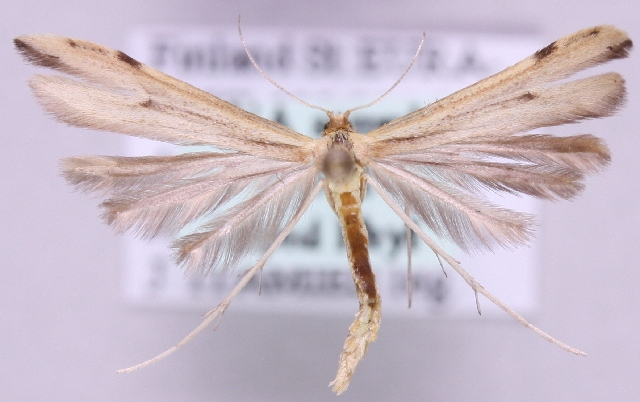

Scientific classification
- Domain: Eukaryota
- Kingdom: Animalia
- Phylum: Arthropoda
- Class: Insecta
- Order: Lepidoptera
- Family: Pterophoridae
- Genus: Hellinsia
- Species: H. distinctus

Binomial name
- Hellinsia distinctus (Herrich-Schäffer, 1855)

Synonyms
- Pterophorus distinctus Herrich-Schäffer, 1858; Leioptilius distinctus; Pterophorus sibericus Caradja, 1920; Leioptilus zermattensis Müller-Rutz, 1933; Oidaematophorus acutus Yano, 1963; Oidamatophorus acutus

= Hellinsia distinctus =

Species of plume moth

Hellinsia distinctus is a moth of the family Pterophoridae that is found from Europe to India, Korea, Japan, China and Russia. Within Europe, it is found from Germany and the Benelux east to Poland, Slovakia, Hungary and Romania, from Italy north to Fennoscandia, and in Greece, Estonia, Latvia and northern and central Russia.

The wingspan is 15–20 millimetres (0.59–0.79 in).

The larvae feed on Antennaria dioica, Gnaphalium luteoalbum, Omalotheca sylvatica, Artemisia absinthium and Artemisia chamaemelifolia.
