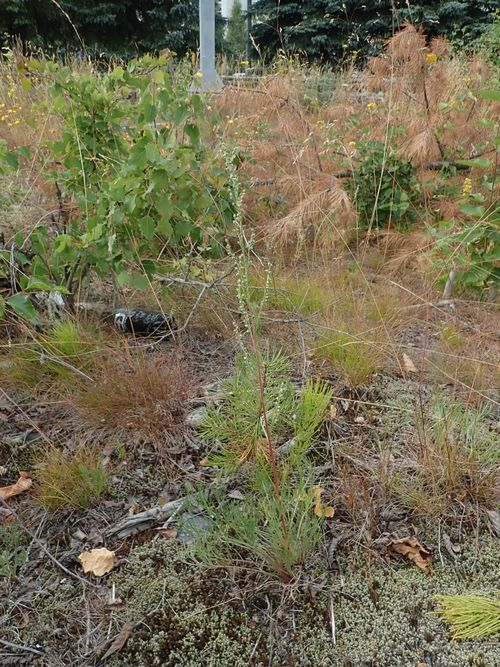

Conservation status
- Near Threatened (IUCN 3.1)

Scientific classification
- Kingdom: Plantae
- Clade: Tracheophytes
- Clade: Angiosperms
- Clade: Eudicots
- Clade: Asterids
- Order: Asterales
- Family: Asteraceae
- Genus: Artemisia
- Species: A. campestris
- Subspecies: A. c. subsp. bottnica

Trinomial name
- Artemisia campestris subsp. bottnica Lundstr. ex Kindb.

Synonyms
- Draconia campestris subsp. bottnica

= Artemisia campestris subsp. bottnica =

Subspecies of plant

Artemisia campestris subsp. bottnica is a subspecies of Artemisia campestris, a flowering plant in the family Asteraceae first described in 1873. It is native to Finland, Sweden and Karelia.

== Status ==
This subspecies is listed as near-threatened by the IUCN. Occupying 350-2000km², they are mostly found in coastal areas.
