= Santonic acid =

Organic compound

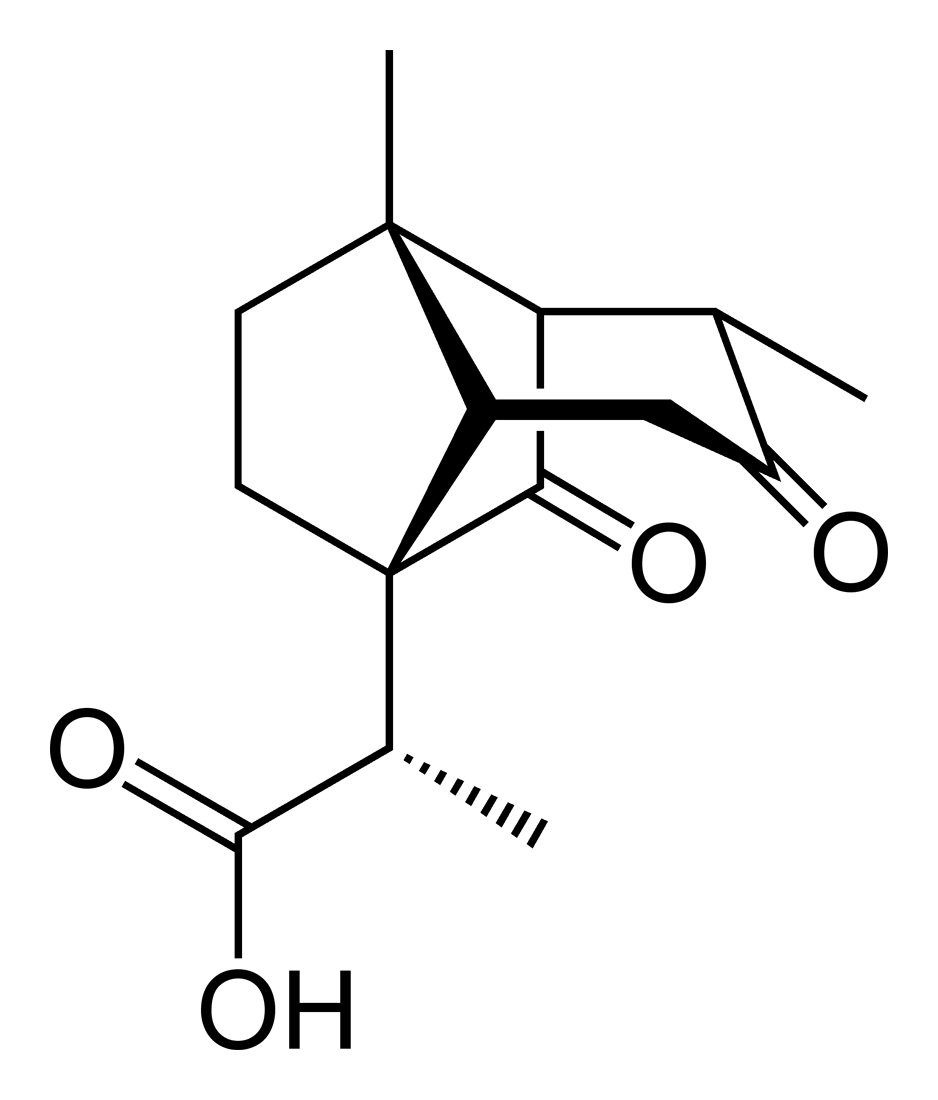

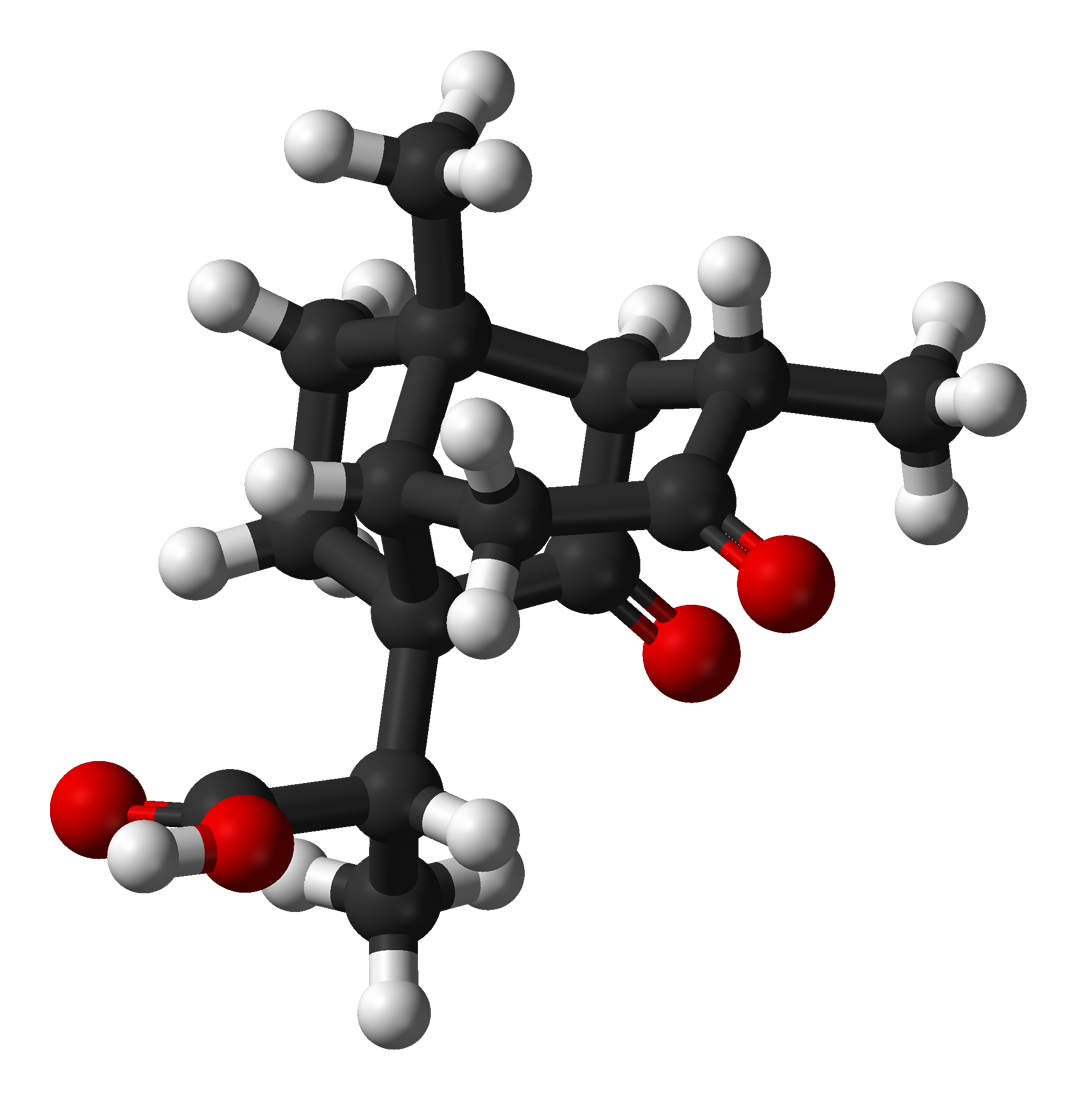

Names
- IUPAC name (−)-2,3,3a,4,5,6,7,7a-octahydro-α,3a,5-trimethyl-6,8-dioxo-1,4-methano-1H-indene-1-acetic acid

Identifiers
CAS Number	510-35-0
3D model (JSmol)	Interactive image
ChEMBL	ChEMBL1992757
ChemSpider	249878
PubChem CID	283654
UNII	0735572T0M
CompTox Dashboard (EPA)	DTXSID3046871
- InChI: InChI=1S/C15H20O4/c1-7-9(16)6-10-14(3)4-5-15(10,8(2)13(18)19)12(17)11(7)14/h7-8,10-11H,4-6H2,1-3H3,(H,18,19) Key: UNPYYTKZOHYHMZ-UHFFFAOYSA-N; InChI=1/C15H20O4/c1-7-9(16)6-10-14(3)4-5-15(10,8(2)13(18)19)12(17)11(7)14/h7-8,10-11H,4-6H2,1-3H3,(H,18,19) Key: UNPYYTKZOHYHMZ-UHFFFAOYAW
- SMILES: O=C(O)C(C31C(=O)C2C(C(=O)CC1C2(CC3)C)C)C

Properties
Chemical formula	C_{15}H_{20}O_{4}
Molar mass	264.32 g mol^{−1}
Density	1.184 g cm^{−3}
Melting point	173 °C (343 °F; 446 K)
- Except where otherwise noted, data are given for materials in their standard state (at 25 °C [77 °F], 100 kPa). verify (what is ?) Infobox references

Santonic acid is an organic compound containing both carboxylic acid and ketone functionality.

It was synthesized from santonin by base-mediated hydrolysis of a lactone followed by a multistep rearrangement process by R. B. Woodward.

Unusually for a carboxylic acid, santonic acid does not form hydrogen-bonded dimers in the crystalline phase. Rather, it adopts a polymeric structure, with individual santonic acid molecules linked by intermolecular carboxyl-to-ketone hydrogen bonds.
