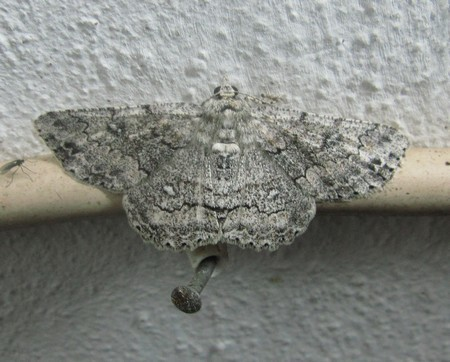

Scientific classification
- Kingdom: Animalia
- Phylum: Arthropoda
- Class: Insecta
- Order: Lepidoptera
- Family: Geometridae
- Subfamily: Ennominae
- Tribe: Boarmiini
- Genus: Ascotis
- Species: A. terebraria

Binomial name
- Ascotis terebraria (Guenée, 1862)

Synonyms
- Hypopalpis terebraria Guenee, 1862; Hypopalpis perforaria Guenee, 1862; Boarmia rousseli Oberthur, 1913

= Ascotis terebraria =

Species of moth

Ascotis terebraria is a moth of the family Geometridae. It is found on La Réunion.

The larvae feed on Humbertia ambavila and Hypericum lanceolatum. The wingspan of the adults is approx. 30-35mm.
