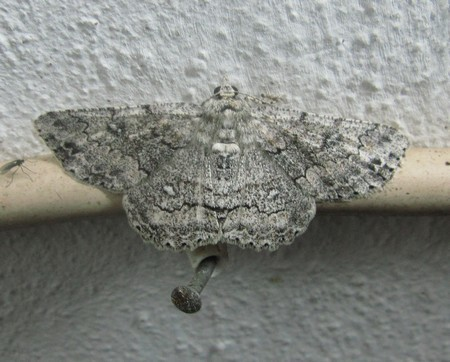
- Ascotis terebraria terebraria

Scientific classification
- Kingdom: Animalia
- Phylum: Arthropoda
- Clade: Pancrustacea
- Class: Insecta
- Order: Lepidoptera
- Family: Geometridae
- Subfamily: Ennominae
- Tribe: Boarmiini
- Genus: Ascotis; Hübner, 1825

= Ascotis =

Genus of moths

Ascotis is a genus of moths in the family Geometridae erected by Jacob Hübner in 1825.

== Selected species ==
- Ascotis antelmaria (Mabille, 1893)
- Ascotis glaucotoxa (Prout, 1927)
- Ascotis fortunata (Blachier, 1887)
- Ascotis margarita Warren, 1894
- Ascotis reciprocaria (Walker, 1860)
- Ascotis selenaria (Denis & Schiffermüller, 1775) – giant looper – type species
- Ascotis sordida Warren, 1894
- Ascotis terebraria Guénée, 1862
