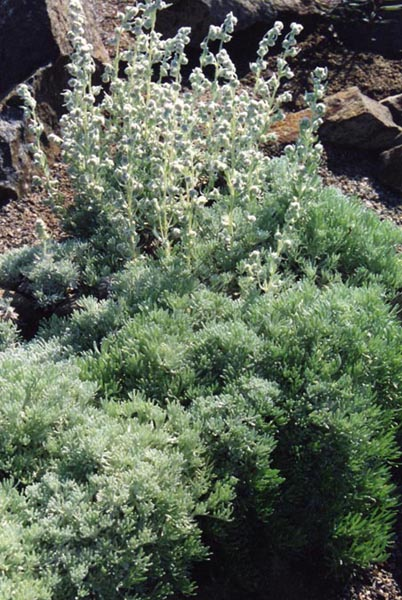

Scientific classification
- Kingdom: Plantae
- Clade: Tracheophytes
- Clade: Angiosperms
- Clade: Eudicots
- Clade: Asterids
- Order: Asterales
- Family: Asteraceae
- Genus: Artemisia
- Species: A. caucasica

Binomial name
- Artemisia caucasica Willd.

= Artemisia alpina =

Species of flowering plant

Artemisia caucasica, also known as Caucasian wormwood, is a species of flowering plant in the Daisy family. It is native to the Caucasus.

== Distribution ==
This species is native to the Caucasus. However, there are reports encounters in Central Spain and Crimea.

One occurrence in 1859 records finding a specimen in Cilicia, Turkey.

== Description ==
This woody evergreen perennial can grow between 10 and 50 cm, producing a mound of silver-coloured foliage.

== Cultivation ==
It has gained the Royal Horticultural Society's Award of Garden Merit.

== Pests ==
This species is generally not susceptible to pests.
