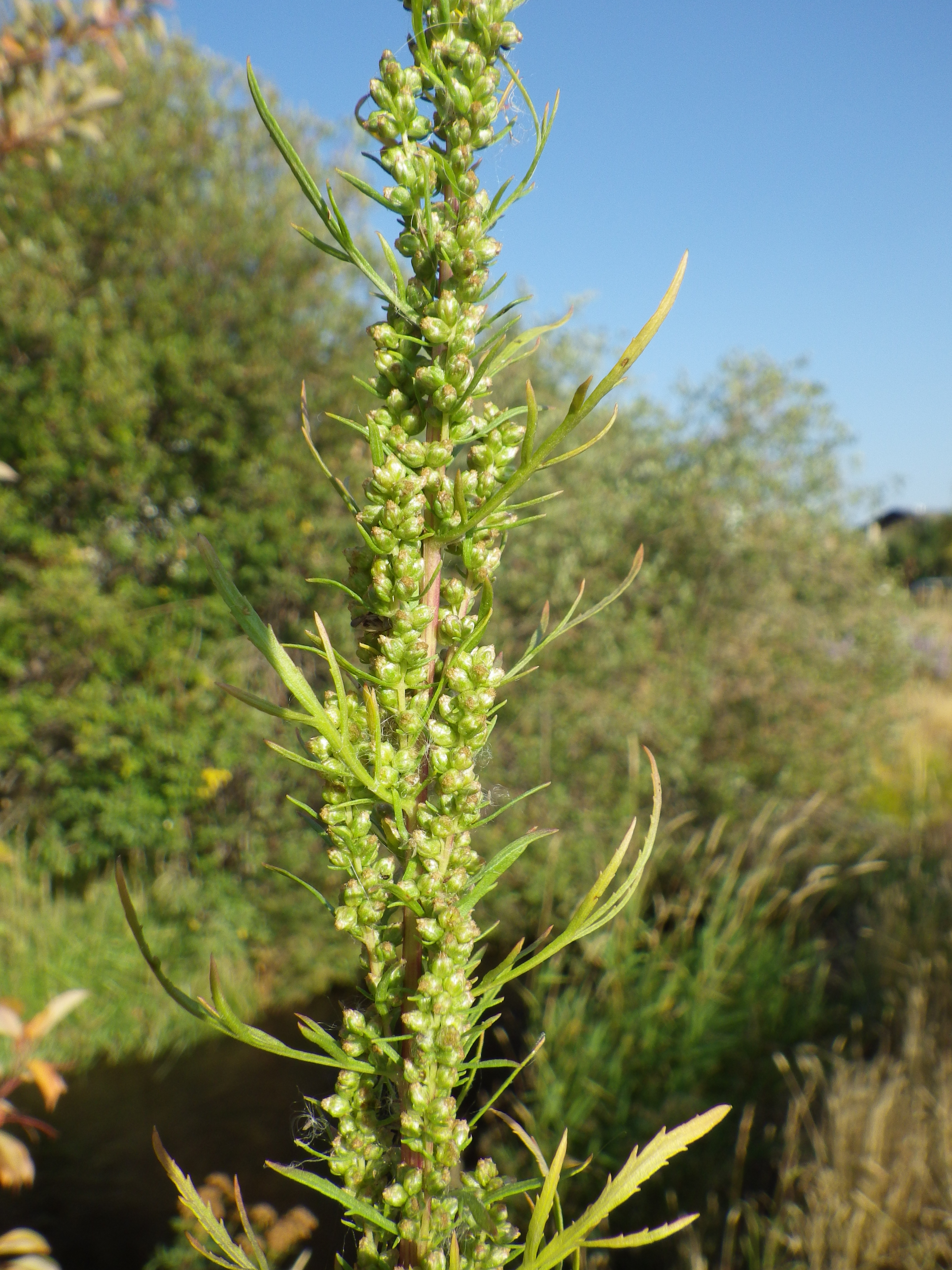

Conservation status
- Secure (NatureServe)

Scientific classification
- Kingdom: Plantae
- Clade: Tracheophytes
- Clade: Angiosperms
- Clade: Eudicots
- Clade: Asterids
- Order: Asterales
- Family: Asteraceae
- Genus: Artemisia
- Species: A. biennis

Binomial name
- Artemisia biennis Willd. 1794

Synonyms
- Synonymy: Artemisia australis Ehrh. ex DC.; Artemisia biennis var. diffusa Dorn; Artemisia inconspicua Spreng.; Artemisia jacquinii Raeusch.; Artemisia pinnatifida Jacquem. ex DC.

= Artemisia biennis =

Species of flowering plant

Artemisia biennis is a species of sagebrush known by the common name biennial wormwood. It is a common and widely distributed weed, so well established in many places that its region of origin is difficult to ascertain. This species is most likely native to northwestern North America (British Columbia, Washington, and Oregon) and naturalized in Western Europe, and eastern and southern North America.

== Description ==
This is an annual or biennial herb producing a single erect green to reddish stem up to 2 metres (6 ft 7 in) in maximum height. It is generally hairless and unscented. The frilly leaves are up to 13 centimetres (5.1 in) long and divided into thin, lance-shaped segments with long teeth. The inflorescence is a dense rod of clusters of flower heads interspersed with leaves. The fruit is a tiny achene less than a millimeter wide. The numerous flowers color ranges from green to yellow, and the flowers are globe shaped. They are in densely packed, small columnar clusters. The alternate leaves are deeply divided into long, narrow lobes with toothed edges. Lower leaves can often be doubled divided. The plants are typically narrow, with spire-like bodies. Unlike other species of this genus, if you crush its leaves or stem, there will be no odor. The bloom period is between August and October. It could be confused with Artemisia annua, however A. annua smells and A. biennis does not.

== Uses ==
The seeds have been eaten, though the seeds are often very small and fiddly to utilize. It has been used internally as treatment for stomach cramps, colic and painful menstruation. Externally, it has been used to treat sores and wounds. The reports do not go into detail on which parts of the plant is used in the treatments. When the seeds are mixed with molasses, they are used to kill the internal parasite known as worms.

== Invasive species ==
It is an invasive species and noxious weed in many places. It is a weed of several agricultural crops, particularly soybeans, other types of dry edible beans, and sunflowers.
