= Artemisia ramosa =

Scientific classification
- Kingdom: Plantae
- Clade: Embryophytes
- Clade: Tracheophytes
- Clade: Angiosperms
- Clade: Eudicots
- Clade: Asterids
- Order: Asterales
- Family: Asteraceae
- Genus: Artemisia
- Species: A. ramosa

Binomial name
- Artemisia ramosa C.Sm. ex Link

Synonyms
- Seriphidium ramosum (C.Sm.) Dobignard

Species of flowering plant

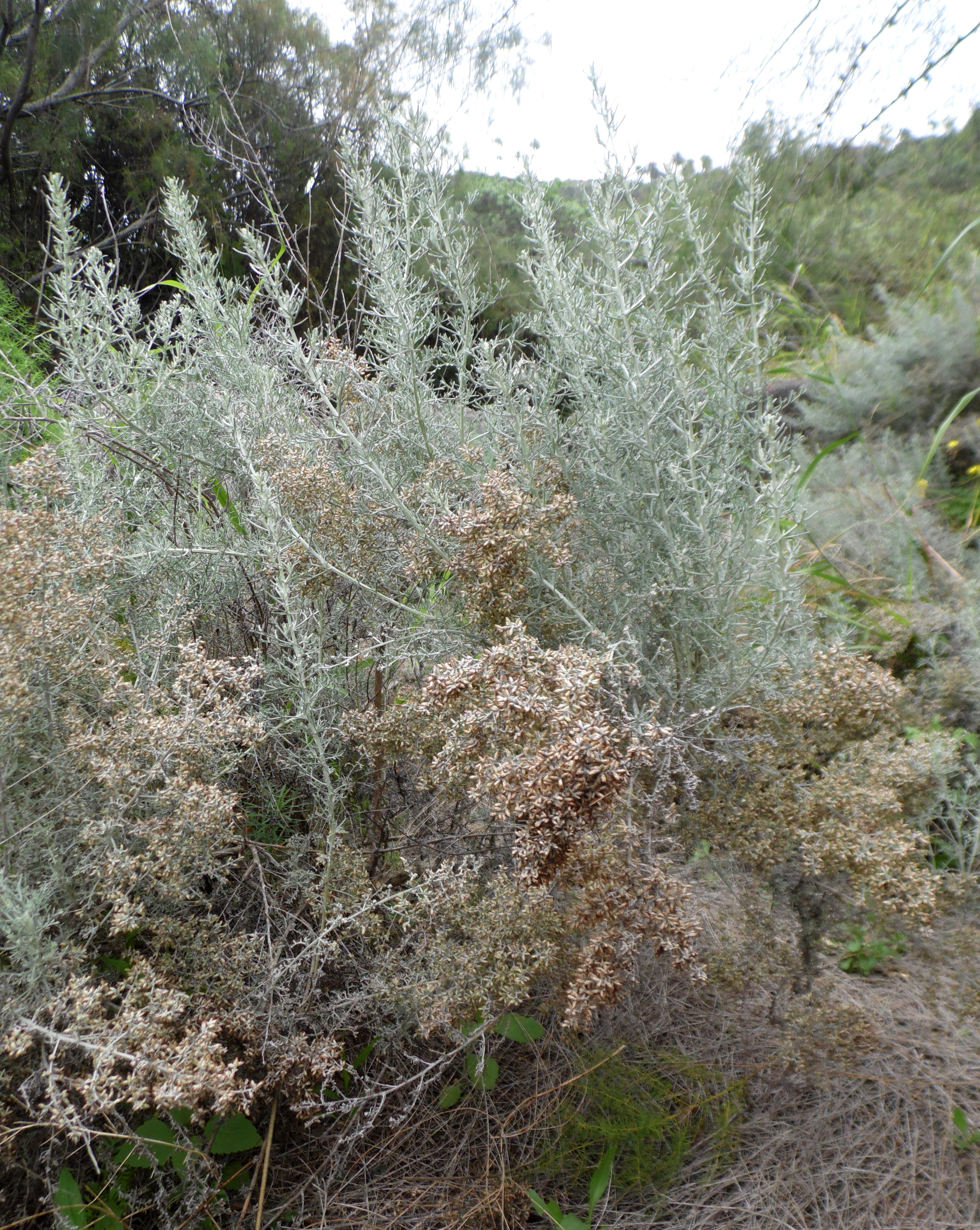
Artemisia ramosa in the Jardín Botánico Canario Viera y Clavijo.

Artemisia ramosa is a species of flowering plant in the family Asteraceae. It is native to the islands of Tenerife and Gran Canaria in the Canary Islands.
