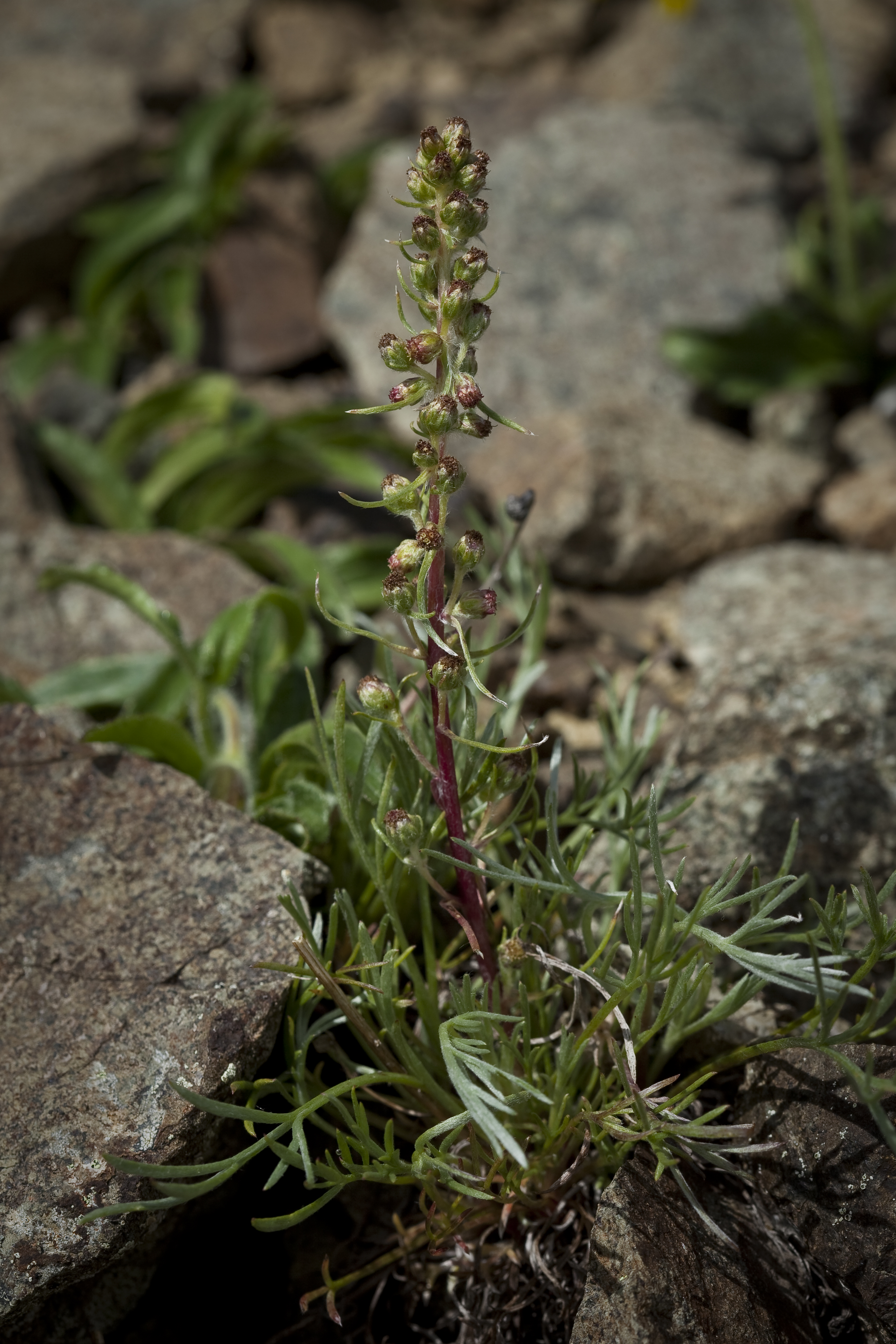

Conservation status
- Apparently Secure (NatureServe)

Scientific classification
- Kingdom: Plantae
- Clade: Tracheophytes
- Clade: Angiosperms
- Clade: Eudicots
- Clade: Asterids
- Order: Asterales
- Family: Asteraceae
- Genus: Artemisia
- Species: A. furcata

Binomial name
- Artemisia furcata M.Bieb.

Subspecies
- Artemisia furcata subsp. flavida Vorosch. & Nechaev; Artemisia furcata subsp. insulana (Krasch.) Vorosch.; Artemisia furcata subsp. furcata

Synonyms
- Species: Ajania furcata (M.Bieb.) Poljakov; subsp. furcata: Artemisia trifurcata Stephan ex Spreng.; Artemisia heterophylla Besser; Artemisia hyperborea Rydb.; Artemisia tacomensis Rydb.; Artemisia glomerata var. pedunculosa Koidz.; Artemisia norvegica subsp. heterophylla (Besser) H.M.Hall & Clem.; Artemisia trifurcata var. pedunculosa (Koidz.) Kitam.; Artemisia yezoensis Tatew. & Kitam.; Artemisia trifurcata subsp. tacomensis (Rydb.) Hultén; Artemisia furcata subsp. tacomensis (Rydb.) Hultén; Artemisia furcata var. pedunculosa (Koidz.) Toyok.; Artemisia trifurcata var. tacomensis (Rydb.) T.Shimizu; subsp. insularis: Artemisia insulana Krasch.; Ajania insulana (Krasch.) Poljakov

= Artemisia furcata =

Species of flowering plant

Artemisia furcata, the forked wormwood, is an Asian and North American species of plant in the sunflower family Asteraceae found in cold regions at high elevations or high latitudes.

== Description ==
Artemisia furcata is a perennial up to 35 centimetres (14 inches) tall, not generally forming clumps. Leaves are gray-green, some forming a rosette at the base, others attached to the stem. Heads are small but numerous and yellow.

== Distribution and habitat ==
It is native to Canada (British Columbia, Alberta, and the three Arctic territories of Northwest Territories, Nunavut, and Yukon), the United States (Alaska and Washington), eastern Russia (Siberia and Russian Far East), Kazakhstan, and Japan. The species is found in tundra and on talus slopes.

== Conservation ==
NatureServe has given the species a global conservation status of Apparently Secure (G4). This was last reviewed 7 August 1991.
