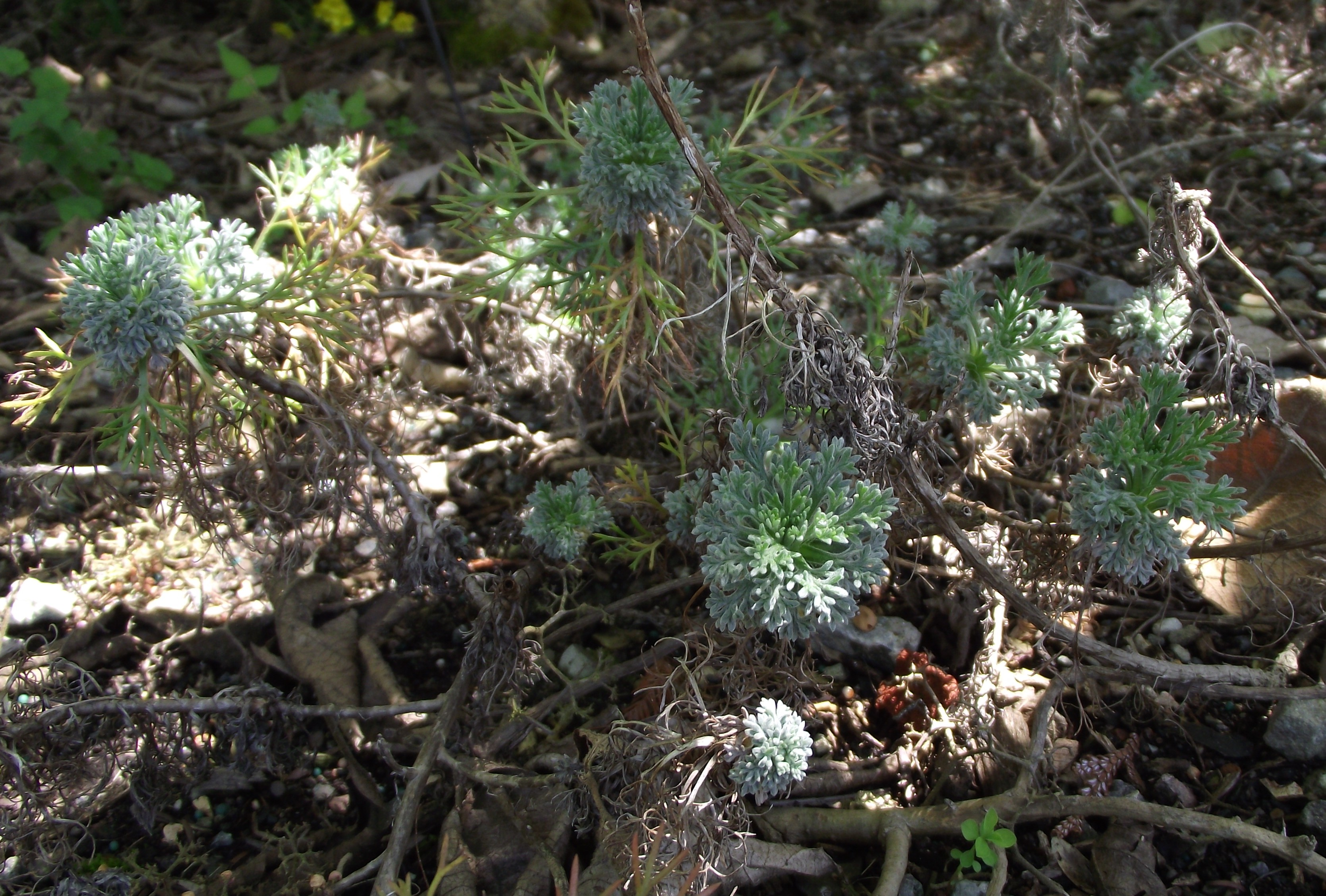

Scientific classification
- Kingdom: Plantae
- Clade: Tracheophytes
- Clade: Angiosperms
- Clade: Eudicots
- Clade: Asterids
- Order: Asterales
- Family: Asteraceae
- Genus: Artemisia
- Species: A. kawakamii

Binomial name
- Artemisia kawakamii Hayata, 1919

= Artemisia kawakamii =

Species of plant

Artemisia kawakamii, commonly known as Kawakami's mugwort, is a plant in the Artemisia genus under the Asteraceae family that is endemic to Taiwan. The plant is distributed on the Taiwan island, growing at elevations from 2,700 to 3,300 m (8,900 to 10,800 ft). It is commonly found in gravelly, open, and arid slopes. The species has yet to be cultivated.

== Publication of the name ==
First published by Bunzō Hayata in Volume 8 of the Icones Plantarum Formosanarum on March 25, 1919, the holotype specimen cited was collected by Takiya Kawakami and Syuniti Sasaki on Yushan at an altitude of 2,439 meters in October 1909.

== Distribution and habitat ==
The species commonly grows in open areas, gravelly slopes, and dry barren slopes in Taiwan at altitudes of 2,700 to 3,300 m (8,900 to 10,800 ft).

== Description ==
An herbaceous plant with stems approximately 8 to 15 cm (3.1 to 5.9 in) in height. The base of the stem may become woody and villous when young but is often glabrous when mature. The leaves are clustered with petioles that are 0.5 to 2 cm (0.20 to 0.79 in) in length. The leaf blade is 2 to 4 cm (0.79 to 1.57 in) in length and 1.4 to 1.8 cm (0.55 to 0.71 in) in width, broadly ovate, pinnately deep lobes with long and narrow segments 0.6 to 1 mm (0.024 to 0.039 in) in width. The adaxial surface is villous when young but becomes glabrous when mature. The abaxial surface is covered with dense white hairs. The capitulum is globose-campanulate arranged in raceme on the inflorescence axis. The involucre is purple and sparsely hairy. The ligulate flowers are female and the corolla is glabrous measuring 1.5 mm (0.059 in) in height, while the corolla of the bisexual flowers is approximately 2 mm (0.079 in) in height. The fruit is a long, elliptic achene, 1.4 mm (0.055 in) in length with clustered hairs at the apex. The flowering period is from June to October.

== Conservation status ==
The Red List of Vascular Plants of Taiwan, 2017: Least concerned
