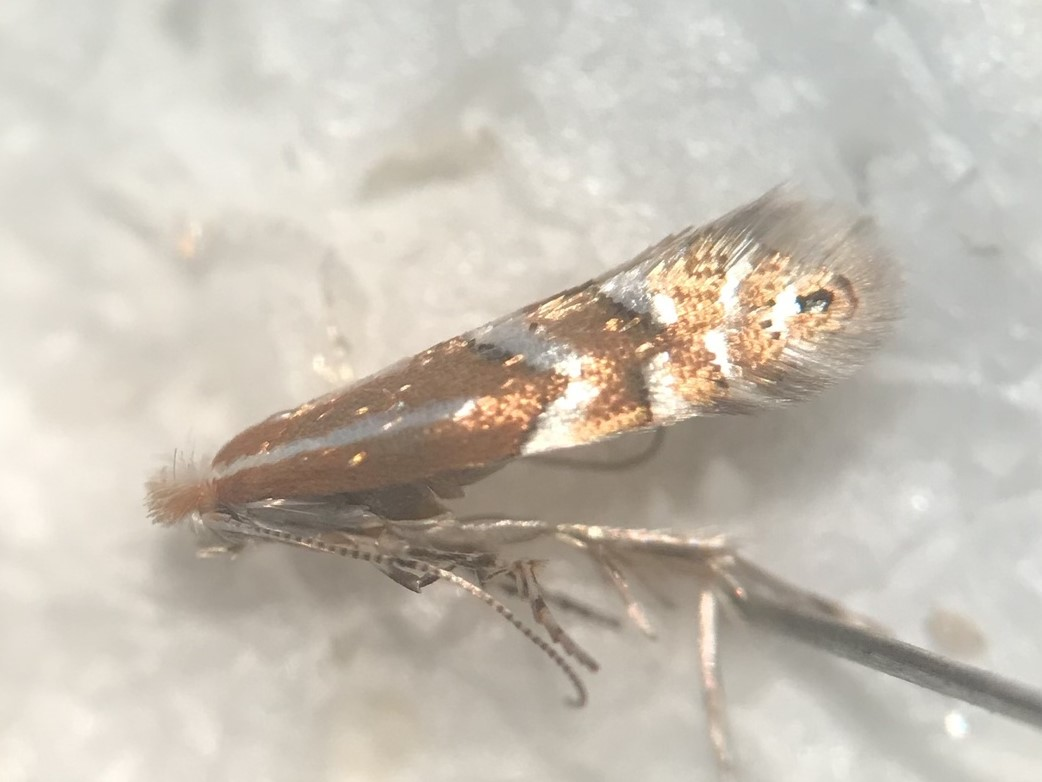

Scientific classification
- Kingdom: Animalia
- Phylum: Arthropoda
- Class: Insecta
- Order: Lepidoptera
- Family: Gracillariidae
- Genus: Phyllonorycter
- Species: P. alaskana

Binomial name
- Phyllonorycter alaskana Deschka, 1982

= Phyllonorycter alaskana =

Species of moth

Phyllonorycter alaskana is a species of moth in the family Gracillariidae. It is known from the United States (Alaska) and Canada (Saskatchewan, Quebec, and Newfoundland).

The larvae feed on Alnus crispa sinuata and Alnus viridis sinuata. They mine the leaves of their host plant. The mine is found on the underside of the leaf.
