= Xanthopsia =

Medical term for seeing everything tinted in yellow

Xanthopsia is a color vision deficiency in which there is a dominantly yellow bias in vision. The most common causes are digoxin's inhibitory action on the sodium pump, and the development of cataracts which can cause a yellow filtering effect.

It has been suggested that Van Gogh contracted xanthopsia as a result of digoxin consumption. Digoxin is a medication derived from digitalis and used to treat various heart conditions. This theory claims xanthopsia as the cause of the yellow tinting exhibited by many of his works.

Xanthopsia is also a rare side-effect of jaundice, in which bilirubin may be deposited into the eye in sufficient quantity to produce a yellow tint to the vision.

== See also ==
- Cyanopsia
