= Artemisia kruhsiana =

Conservation status
- Apparently Secure (NatureServe)

Scientific classification
- Kingdom: Plantae
- Clade: Tracheophytes
- Clade: Angiosperms
- Clade: Eudicots
- Clade: Asterids
- Order: Asterales
- Family: Asteraceae
- Genus: Artemisia
- Species: A. kruhsiana

Binomial name
- Artemisia kruhsiana Besser

Synonyms
- Artemisia alaskana Rydb.; Artemisia tyrrellii Rydb.; Artemisia condensata (Korobkov) A.P.Khokhr.; Artemisia multisecta Leonova

Species of flowering plant

Artemisia kruhsiana, also known as Alaskan sagebrush, Alaskan wormwood, and Siberian wormwood, is a species of plant in the sunflower family. It is found in Asia from eastern Siberia to the northern Russian Far East, and in North America from Alaska, British Columbia, Yukon, and the Northwest Territories.

== Description ==
It is a perennial shrub up to 2 feet tall. The fruit is a cypsela, even though it is commonly mistaken as an achene. The bloom color is yellow. The bloom period is from June, July, and to August. The leaves are blunt-tipped and twice ternate. Hair covers the white-silvery leaves and stem.

== Uses ==
Artemisia kruhsiana is used by the larvae of butterflies which are pollinating it. The plant is an important ingredient in some French cuisines, which chefs use as a flavoring. The plant has a medical purpose as well. It can be used as a cough medicine, lowers fever, cures colic and headache, and is great against intestinal parasites and malaria. The shrub emits a strong odor and has a bitter taste related to the terpenoids and sesquiterpene lactones within its cells.

The plant is used in various cosmetics such as enemas, infusions, lotions, and poultices. It is also used in breweries, and can be used as oil to repel fleas and moths from clothes. Moreover, it can be used as an anthelmintic, febrifuge, and stomachic. The plant requires full sun and partial shade, and a dry soil.

Some wormwoods are used by native Alaskans, including the Tanainas. There are used in steam baths, on top of the rocks.

== Conservation status ==
It has a global rank of G4, meaning apparently secure. It also has a rank of S4 in Alaska and the Yukon. It has a S2 rank in British Columbia, meaning endangered. It does not have a local rank in the Northwest Territories.
