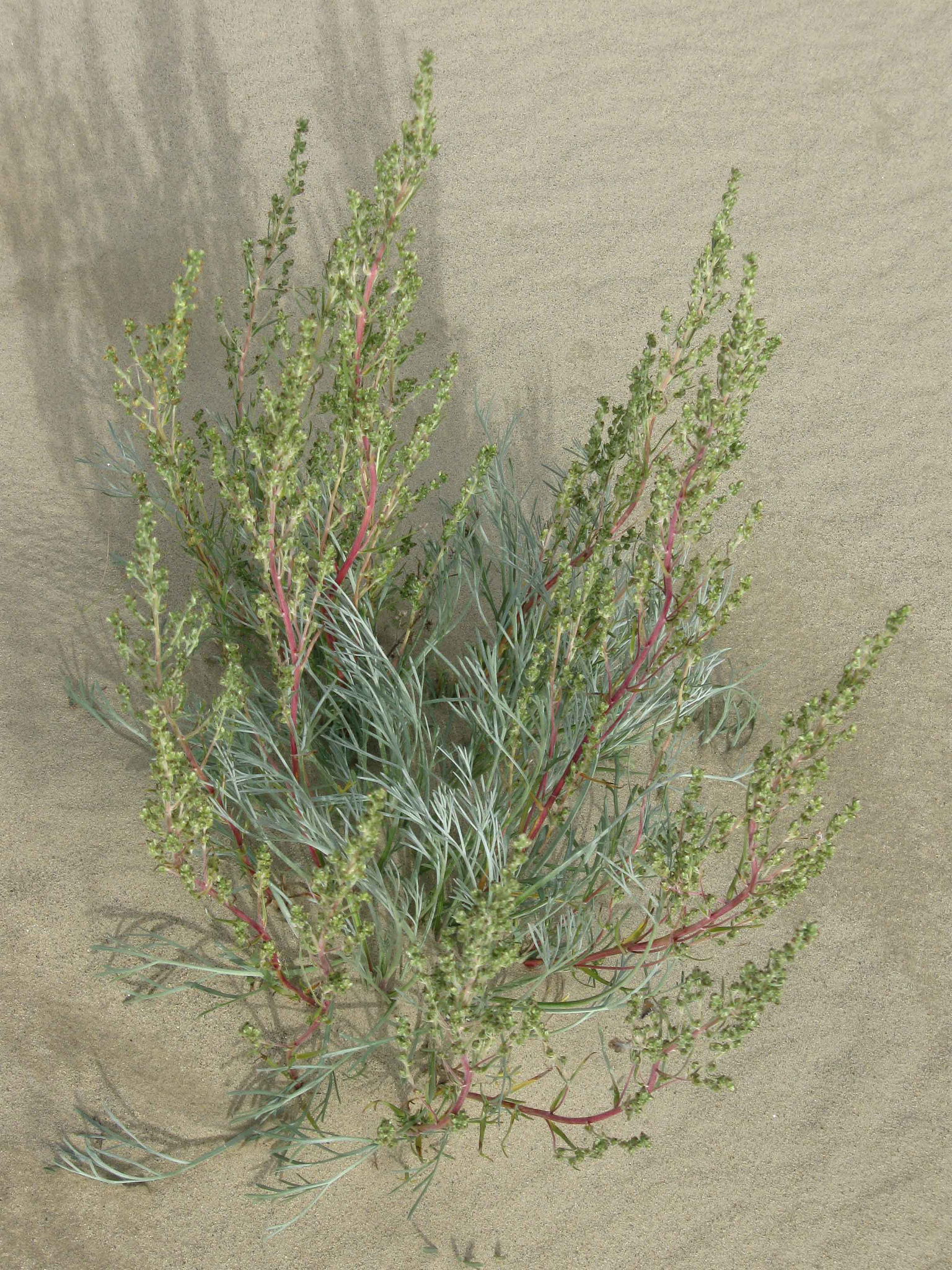

Conservation status
- Secure (NatureServe)

Scientific classification
- Kingdom: Plantae
- Clade: Tracheophytes
- Clade: Angiosperms
- Clade: Eudicots
- Clade: Asterids
- Order: Asterales
- Family: Asteraceae
- Genus: Artemisia
- Species: A. campestris
- Subspecies: A. c. subsp. borealis

Trinomial name
- Artemisia campestris subsp. borealis (Pall.) H.M.Hall & Clem.

Synonyms
- Synonymy: Absinthium boreale (Pall.) Besser; Artemisia allionii Nyman; Artemisia ambigua Thunb.; Artemisia bocconei All.; Artemisia borealis Pall.; Artemisia borealis f. adamsii (Besser) J.Rousseau; Artemisia borealis var. adamsii Besser; Artemisia borealis var. alluvialis Korobkov; Artemisia borealis var. ammophila Korobkov; Artemisia borealis var. besseri Torr. & A.Gray; Artemisia borealis var. canadensis Bush; Artemisia borealis var. latiloba Vacc.; Artemisia borealis f. latisecta (Fernald) J.Rousseau; Artemisia borealis var. latisecta Fernald; Artemisia borealis var. ledebourii Besser; Artemisia borealis subsp. mertensii (Besser ex Poljakov) V.P.Ameljczenko; Artemisia borealis var. mertensii Besser; Artemisia borealis subsp. nana (Gaudin) E.P.Perrier; Artemisia borealis f. purshii (Besser ex Hook) J.Rousseau; Artemisia borealis subsp. purshii (Besser ex Hook) Hultén; Artemisia borealis var. purshii Besser; Artemisia borealis var. spithamaea (Pursh) Torr. & A.Gray; Artemisia borealis f. typica J.Rousseau; Artemisia borealis subsp. wormskioldii (Besser) Piper; Artemisia borealis var. wormskioldii Besser; Artemisia borealis f. wormskioldii (Besser); Artemisia campestris var. borealis (Pall.) M.Peck; Artemisia campestris var. purshii (Besser) Cronquist; Artemisia campestris subsp. spithamaea (Pursh) H.M.Hall & Clem; Artemisia campestris var. spithamaea (Pursh) M.Peck; Artemisia campestris var. wormskioldii (Besser ex Hook) Cronquist; Artemisia camtschatica Schltdl. ex Ledeb.; Artemisia canadensis f. peucedanifolia (Juss. ex Besser) Vict. & J.Rousseau; Artemisia gelida Ledeb.; Artemisia helvetica Schleich.; Artemisia nana Gaudin; Artemisia nana var. parviflora Gaudin; Artemisia norica Leyb.; Artemisia pallasii Willd. ex Spreng.; Artemisia peucedanifolia Juss. ex Besser; Artemisia purshiana Besser; Artemisia ripicola Rydb.; Artemisia spithamaea Pursh; Artemisia stelleri Steven ex Ledeb.; Artemisia vermiculata Schangin ex DC.; Artemisia violacea Ledeb.; Draconia campestris subsp. borealis (Pall.) Soják; Oligosporus borealis (Pall.) Poljakov; Oligosporus nanus (Gaudin) Poljakov; Oligosporus peucedanifolius (Juss. ex Besser) Poljakov

= Artemisia campestris subsp. borealis =

Species of flowering plant

Artemisia campestris subsp. borealis is an arctic and alpine subspecies of plant in the sunflower family, commonly known as northern wormwood, boreal sage, boreal wormwood or boreal sagewort. It is native to high latitudes and high elevations in Eurasia and North America. In North America, it can be found in Alaska, Greenland, the Canadian Arctic, and the Rockies, Cascades, and Sierra Nevada as far south as Arizona and New Mexico. In Eurasia, it is widespread across European and Asiatic Russia and also grows in Scandinavia and in the mountains of central Europe (Carpathians, Alps, etc.)

== Description ==
Perennials, (6–)8–20(–40) cm (caespitose), mildly aromatic; taprooted, caudices branched. Stems (1–)2–5, gray-green, tomentose. Leaves persistent, basal rosettes persistent, gray-green to white; blades ovate, 2–4 × 0.5–1 cm, 2–3-pinnately or -ternately lobed, lobes linear to narrowly oblong, apices acute, faces moderately to densely sericeous. Heads (proximal sessile, distal pedunculate) in (leafy) spiciform arrays 4–9(–12) × (0.5–)1–5 cm. Involucres hemispheric, 3–4 × 3.5–4 mm. Phyllaries (obscurely scarious) densely tomentose-villous. Florets: pistillate 8–10; functionally staminate 15–30; corollas (or lobes) yellow-orange or deep red, 2.2–3.5. Cypselae oblong-lanceoloid, somewhat compressed, 0.4–1 millimetre (0.016–0.039 in), faintly nerved, glabrous.
