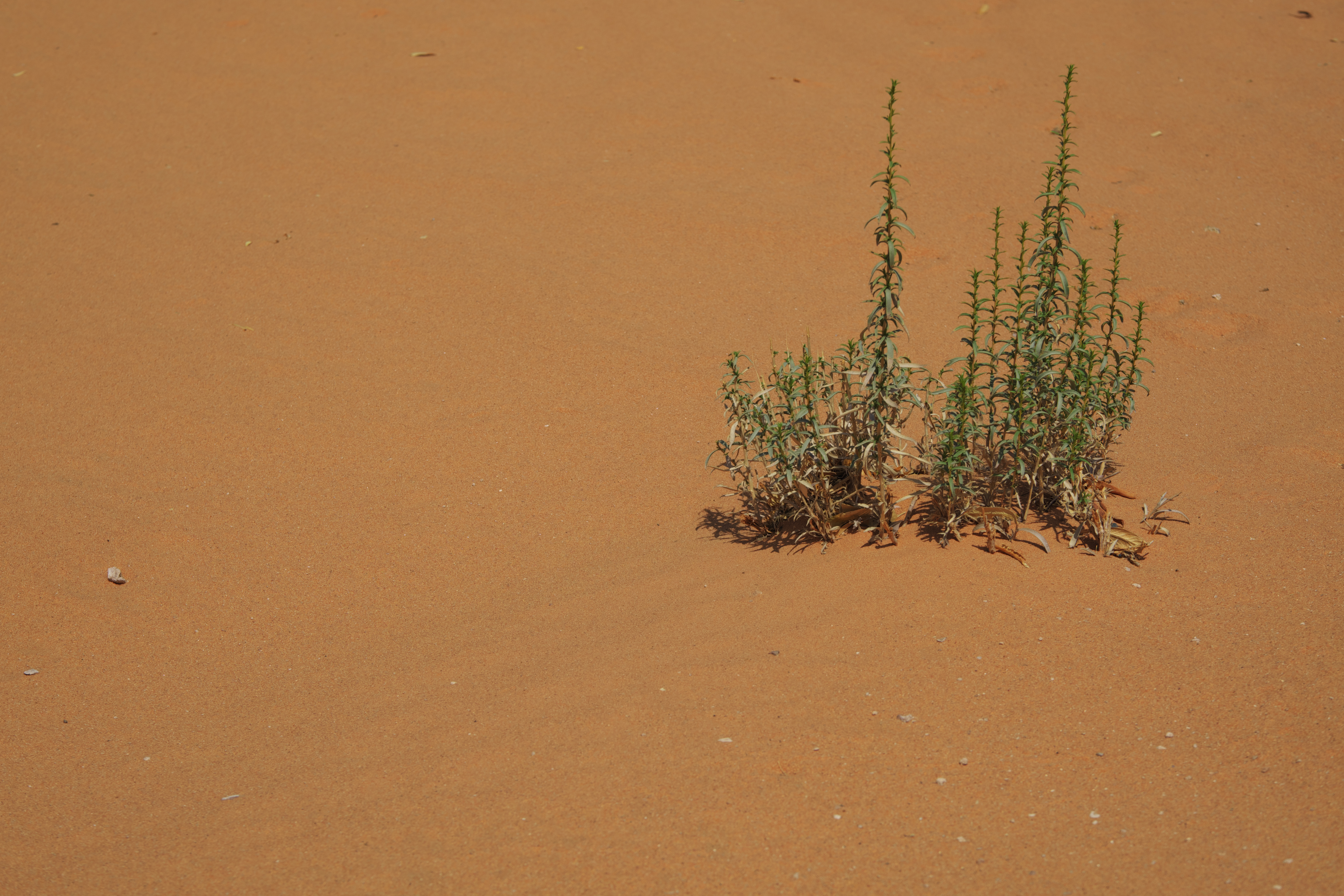
- Habit

Scientific classification
- Kingdom: Plantae
- Clade: Embryophytes
- Clade: Tracheophytes
- Clade: Spermatophytes
- Clade: Angiosperms
- Clade: Eudicots
- Clade: Asterids
- Order: Asterales
- Family: Asteraceae
- Genus: Artemisia
- Species: A. monosperma

Binomial name
- Artemisia monosperma Delile

Synonyms
- Artemisia deliliana Besser; Oligosporus monospermus (Delile) Poljakov; Oligosporus monospermus Decne. ex DC.

= Artemisia monosperma =

Species of flowering plant

Artemisia monosperma is a species of flowering plant in the wormwood genus Artemisia, family Asteraceae, native to Libya, Egypt, the Levant, and the Arabian Peninsula. It plays an important role in ecological succession by stabilizing sand dunes.
