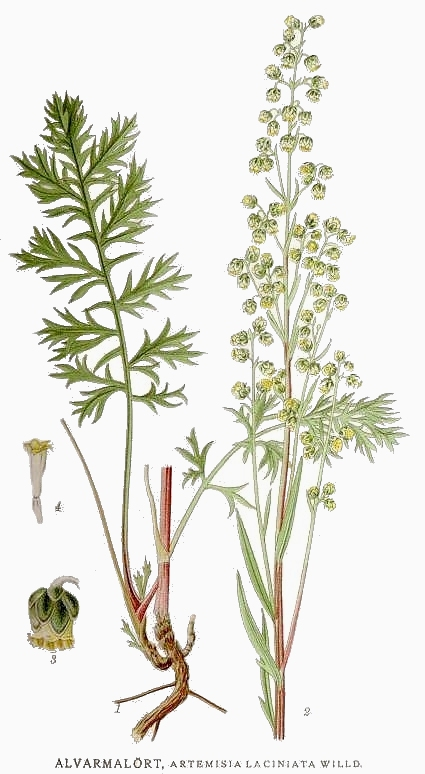

Conservation status
- Apparently Secure (NatureServe)

Scientific classification
- Kingdom: Plantae
- Clade: Tracheophytes
- Clade: Angiosperms
- Clade: Eudicots
- Clade: Asterids
- Order: Asterales
- Family: Asteraceae
- Genus: Artemisia
- Species: A. laciniata

Binomial name
- Artemisia laciniata Willd.

= Artemisia laciniata =

Species of plant

Artemisia laciniata is a species of wormwood in the family Asteraceae. Its common name is the Siberian wormwood. It is mostly found in Russia, Alaska, the Yukon, and other parts of the US and Europe.

== Description ==
Artemisia laciniata can reach heights up to 50 or 60 centimeters. The alternate leaves are gray-green in color and are bipinnate. The lanceolate leaflets have entire margins. It produces a lot of greenish yellow flowers with many stellates. Its bloom period is from August to October. The fruit type is achenes. It is a hermaphrodite (has both male and female organs).

May be confused with Tanacetum bipinnatum and Artemisia norvegica, but Tanacetum has pointed leaves and A. novegica has bigger flowers and less developed leaves, differentiating the plants.

== Distribution ==
Where Artemisia laciniata is native to is disputed in some places. There is no dispute with some countries and territories, like Russia (especially Siberia), Alaska, the Yukon, and Mongolia. Some sources say it is also native to states along the Rocky Mountains, and parts of Europe including Austria, Czechia, and Sweden. Whether or not it is extinct in Germany is also controversial. It also is probably native to Kashmir.

== Habitat ==
It can be found in dry gravelly stream banks, grassy flats, forested areas, and dry hillsides. Its elevation is between 100 and 1500 meters.
