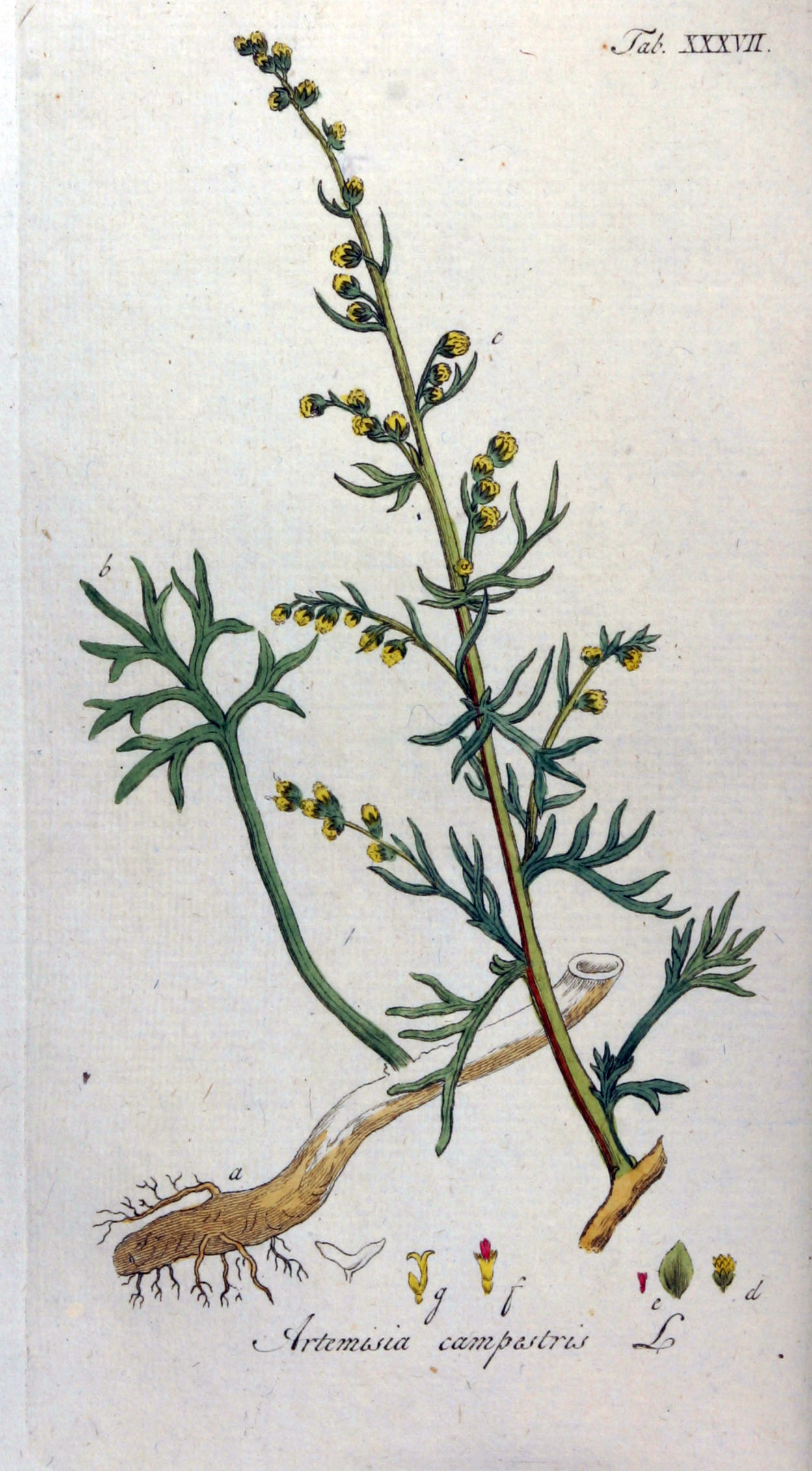
- 1813 illustration

Conservation status
- Secure (NatureServe)

Scientific classification
- Kingdom: Plantae
- Clade: Tracheophytes
- Clade: Angiosperms
- Clade: Eudicots
- Clade: Asterids
- Order: Asterales
- Family: Asteraceae
- Genus: Artemisia
- Species: A. campestris

Binomial name
- Artemisia campestris L. 1753 not Pursh 1813 nor Kitam. 1940

Synonyms
- List: Abrotanum frutescens Gilib. syn. of subsp. campestris; Absinthium boreale (Pall.) Besser syn. of subsp. borealis; Absinthium campestre Dulac syn. of subsp. campestris; Absinthium virescens Juss. ex Besser syn. of subsp. campestris; Artemisia allionii Nyman syn. of subsp. borealis; Artemisia ambigua Thunb. syn. of subsp. borealis; Artemisia bocconei All. syn. of subsp. borealis; Artemisia borealis Pall. syn. of subsp. borealis; Artemisia borealis f. adamsii (Besser) J.Rousseau syn. of subsp. borealis; Artemisia borealis var. adamsii Besser syn. of subsp. borealis; Artemisia borealis var. alluvialis Korobkov syn. of subsp. borealis; Artemisia borealis var. ammophila Korobkov syn. of subsp. borealis; Artemisia borealis var. besseri Torr. & A.Gray syn. of subsp. borealis; Artemisia borealis var. canadensis Bush syn. of subsp. borealis; Artemisia borealis f. latisecta (Fernald) J.Rousseau syn. of subsp. borealis; Artemisia borealis var. latisecta Fernald syn. of subsp. borealis; Artemisia borealis var. ledebourii Besser syn. of subsp. borealis; Artemisia borealis subsp. mertensii (Besser ex Poljakov) V.P.Ameljczenko syn. of subsp. borealis; Artemisia borealis var. mertensii Besser syn. of subsp. borealis; Artemisia borealis subsp. purshii (Besser ex Hook) Hultén syn. of subsp. borealis; Artemisia borealis f. purshii (Besser ex Hook) J.Rousseau syn. of subsp. borealis; Artemisia borealis var. purshii Besser syn. of subsp. borealis; Artemisia borealis var. spithamaea (Pursh) Torr. & A.Gray syn. of subsp. borealis; Artemisia borealis f. typica J.Rousseau syn. of subsp. borealis; Artemisia borealis f. wormskioldii (Besser) J.Rousseau syn. of subsp. borealis; Artemisia borealis var. wormskioldii Besser syn. of subsp. borealis; Artemisia bothnica Lundstr. ex Nyman syn. of subsp. campestris; Artemisia campestris var. borealis (Pall.) M.Peck syn. of subsp. borealis; Artemisia campestris var. canadensis (Michx.) S.L.Welsh syn. of subsp. canadensis; Artemisia campestris var. caudata (Michx.) B.L.Turner syn. of subsp. caudata; Artemisia campestris var. glutinosa (J.Gay ex Besser) Y.R.Ling syn. of subsp. glutinosa; Artemisia campestris var. pacifica (Nutt.) M.Peck syn. of subsp. pacifica; Artemisia campestris var. petiolata S.L.Welsh syn. of subsp. pacifica; Artemisia campestris var. purshii (Besser) Cronquist syn. of subsp. borealis; Artemisia campestris var. scouleriana (Besser ex Hook.) Cronquist syn. of subsp. pacifica; Artemisia campestris subsp. spithamaea (Pursh) H.M.Hall & Clem. syn. of subsp. borealis; Artemisia campestris var. spithamaea (Pursh) M.Peck syn. of subsp. borealis; Artemisia campestris var. strutzae S.L.Welsh syn. of subsp. pacifica; Artemisia campestris subsp. typica H.M.Hall & Clem.; Artemisia campestris var. wormskioldii (Besser ex Hook) Cronquist syn. of subsp. borealis; Artemisia camporum Rydb. syn. of subsp. pacifica; Artemisia camtschatica Schltdl. ex Ledeb. syn. of subsp. borealis; Artemisia canadensis Michx. syn. of subsp. canadensis; Artemisia canadensis f. dutillyanus J.Rousseau ex Lepage syn. of subsp. canadensis; Artemisia canadensis f. peucedanifolia (Juss. ex DC.) J.Rousseau syn. of subsp. canadensis; Artemisia canadensis f. pumila J.Rousseau syn. of subsp. canadensis; Artemisia canadensis f. repustris J.Rousseau syn. of subsp. canadensis; Artemisia canadensis f. typica J.Rousseau syn. of subsp. canadensis; Artemisia caudata Michx. syn. of subsp. caudata; Artemisia caudata var. calvens Lunell syn. of subsp. caudata; Artemisia caudata f. forwoodii (S.Watson) J.Rousseau syn. of subsp. caudata; Artemisia caudata var. majuscula J.Rousseau syn. of subsp. caudata; Artemisia caudata f. pubera J.Rousseau syn. of subsp. caudata; Artemisia caudata var. rydbergiana B.Boivin syn. of subsp. caudata; Artemisia caudata f. typica J.Rousseau syn. of subsp. caudata; Artemisia clausonis Pomel syn. of subsp. campestris; Artemisia coarctata Turcz. ex Ledeb. syn. of subsp. campestris; Artemisia collina Schur syn. of subsp. campestris; Artemisia commutata var. hookeriana (Besser) Besser syn. of subsp. pacifica; Artemisia commutata var. scouleriana (Besser) Besser syn. of subsp. pacifica; Artemisia cordata Alph.Wood syn. of subsp. caudata; Artemisia desertorum var. hookeriana Besser syn. of subsp. pacifica; Artemisia desertorum var. scouleriana Besser syn. of subsp. pacifica; Artemisia dniproica Klokov syn. of subsp. campestris; Artemisia forwoodii S.Watson syn. of subsp. caudata; Artemisia forwoodii var. calvens (Lunell) Lunell syn. of subsp. caudata; Artemisia gelida Ledeb. syn. of subsp. borealis; Artemisia glabrescens Stokes syn. of subsp. campestris; Artemisia glutinosa J.Gay syn. of subsp. glutinosa; Artemisia glutinosa J.Gay ex Besser syn. of subsp. glutinosa; Artemisia groenlandica Hornem. syn. of subsp. canadensis; Artemisia helvetica Schleich. syn. of subsp. borealis; Artemisia hermaphrodita Kit. ex Ledeb. syn. of subsp. campestris; Artemisia infirma S.G.Gmel. ex Ledeb. syn. of subsp. campestris; Artemisia italica M.Bieb. ex Ledeb. syn. of subsp. campestris; Artemisia jussieana J.Gay ex Besser syn. of subsp. campestris; Artemisia lanata Lam. syn. of subsp. glutinosa; Artemisia lednicensis Rochel ex Spreng. syn. of subsp. lednicensis; Artemisia monspeliensis Nyman syn. of subsp. glutinosa; Artemisia nana Gaudin syn. of subsp. borealis; Artemisia neapolitana Ten. syn. of subsp. glutinosa; Artemisia norica Leyb. syn. of subsp. borealis; Artemisia norvegica var. pacifica (Nutt.) A.Gray syn. of subsp. pacifica; Artemisia occitanica Salzm. ex DC. syn. of subsp. campestris; Artemisia odoratissima Desf. syn. of subsp. campestris; Artemisia pacifica Nutt. syn. of subsp. pacifica; Artemisia pallasii Willd. ex Spreng. syn. of subsp. borealis; Artemisia paniculata Sch.Bip. ex Willk. syn. of subsp. glutinosa; Artemisia peucedanifolia Juss. ex DC. syn. of subsp. canadensis; Artemisia procera Lapeyr. syn. of subsp. glutinosa; Artemisia purshiana Besser syn. of subsp. borealis; Artemisia ripicola Rydb. syn. of subsp. borealis; Artemisia saligna Ten. syn. of subsp. glutinosa; Artemisia santonicum Siev. ex Besser syn. of subsp. campestris; Artemisia scouleriana Rydb. syn. of subsp. pacifica; Artemisia spithamaea Pursh syn. of subsp. borealis; Artemisia stelleri Steven ex Ledeb. syn. of subsp. borealis; Artemisia tenuifolia Bubani syn. of subsp. campestris; Artemisia variabilis Ten. syn. of subsp. variabilis; Artemisia vermiculata Schangin ex DC. syn. of subsp. borealis; Artemisia violacea Ledeb. syn. of subsp. borealis; Artemisia viscosa DC. syn. of subsp. glutinosa; Draconia campestris (L.) Soják; Draconia campestris subsp. borealis (Pall.) Soják syn. of subsp. borealis; Draconia campestris subsp. bottnica (Lundstr. ex Kindb.) Soják syn. of subsp. bottnica; Draconia campestris subsp. glutinosa (DC.) Soják syn. of subsp. glutinosa; Draconia campestris f. oligocephala (Abrom.) Sutorý syn. of subsp. campestris; Oligosporus borealis (Pall.) Poljakov syn. of subsp. borealis; Oligosporus brachylobus Jord. & Fourr. syn. of subsp. campestris; Oligosporus brachyphyllus Jord. & Fourr. syn. of subsp. campestris; Oligosporus brevicaulis Jord. & Fourr. syn. of subsp. campestris; Oligosporus campestris (L.) Cass.; Oligosporus campestris subsp. caudatus (Michx.) W.A.Weber syn. of subsp. caudata; Oligosporus campestris subsp. pacificus (Nutt.) W.A.Weber syn. of subsp. pacifica; Oligosporus canadensis (Michx.) Poljakov syn. of subsp. canadensis; Oligosporus caudatus (Michx.) Poljakov syn. of subsp. caudata; Oligosporus collinus Jord. & Fourr. syn. of subsp. campestris; Oligosporus delphinensis Jord. & Fourr. syn. of subsp. campestris; Oligosporus eoythrocladus Jord. & Fourr. syn. of subsp. campestris; Oligosporus floribundus Jord. & Fourr. syn. of subsp. campestris; Oligosporus fuscatus Jord. & Fourr. syn. of subsp. campestris; Oligosporus glutinosus (J.Gay ex Besser) Poljakov syn. of subsp. glutinosa; Oligosporus glutinosus Fourr. syn. of subsp. glutinosa; Oligosporus griseus Jord. & Fourr. syn. of subsp. campestris; Oligosporus groenlandicus (Hornem.) Á.Löve & D.Löve syn. of subsp. borealis; Oligosporus implexus Jord. & Fourr. syn. of subsp. campestris; Oligosporus jussieanus (J.Gay ex Besser) Poljakov syn. of subsp. campestris; Oligosporus laxatus Jord. & Fourr. syn. of subsp. campestris; Oligosporus littoreus Jord. & Fourr. syn. of subsp. campestris; Oligosporus monspeliensis Jord. & Fourr. syn. of subsp. glutinosa; Oligosporus monticola Jord. & Fourr. syn. of subsp. campestris; Oligosporus nanus (Gaudin) Poljakov syn. of subsp. borealis; Oligosporus orophilus Jord. & Fourr. syn. of subsp. campestris; Oligosporus pacificus (Nutt.) Poljakov syn. of subsp. pacifica; Oligosporus parvulus Jord. & Fourr. syn. of subsp. campestris; Oligosporus peucedanifolius (Juss. ex DC.) Poljakov syn. of subsp. borealis; Oligosporus pubescens Jord. & Fourr. syn. of subsp. campestris; Oligosporus pyramidatus Jord. & Fourr. syn. of subsp. campestris; Oligosporus stenocladus Jord. & Fourr. syn. of subsp. campestris; Oligosporus suberectus Jord. & Fourr. syn. of subsp. campestris; Oligosporus tenuifolius Jord. & Fourr. syn. of subsp. campestris; Oligosporus variabilis (Ten.) Poljakov syn. of subsp. glutinosa; Oligosporus virescens Jord. & Fourr. syn. of subsp. campestris; Oligosporus xylopodus Jord. & Fourr. syn. of subsp. campestris

= Artemisia campestris =

Species of flowering plant

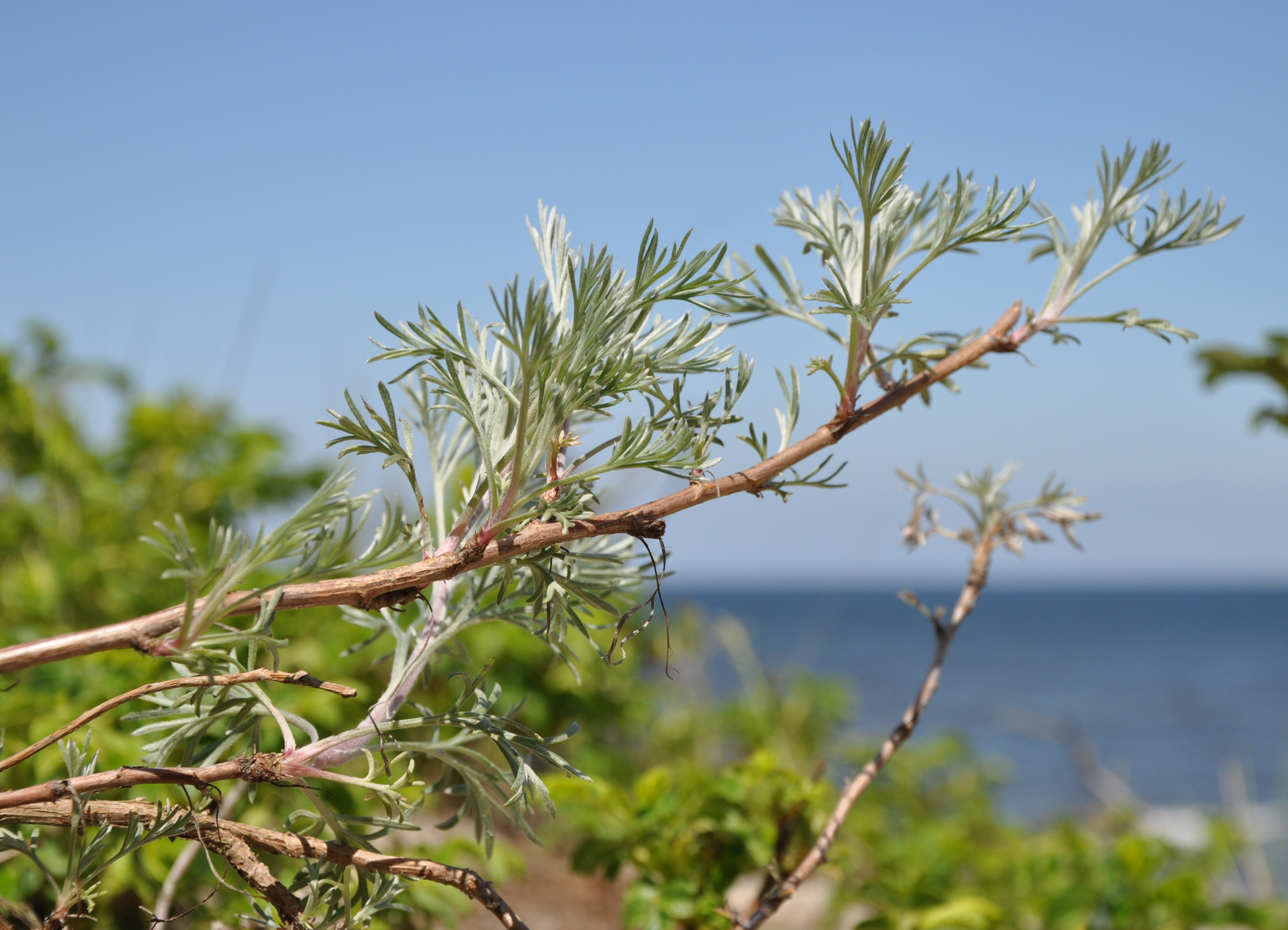
Artemisia campestris near the Baltic Sea

Artemisia campestris is a common and widespread species of plants in the sunflower family, Asteraceae. It is native to a wide region of Eurasia and North America. Common names include field wormwood, beach wormwood, northern wormwood, Breckland wormwood, boreal wormwood, Canadian wormwood, field sagewort and field mugwort.

Artemisia campestris is a branching, aromatic plant up to 150 cm (5 ft) tall. It grows in open sites on dry sandy soils, in steppes, rocky slopes, and waste areas.

== Subspecies ==
The following subspecies are accepted:

- Artemisia campestris subsp. borealis (Pall.) H.M.Hall & Clem.
- Artemisia campestris subsp. bottnica Lundstr. ex Kindb.
- Artemisia campestris subsp. campestris
- Artemisia campestris subsp. canadensis (Michx.) Scoggan
- Artemisia campestris subsp. caudata (Michx.) H.M.Hall & Clem.
- Artemisia campestris subsp. cinerea
- Artemisia campestris subsp. glutinosa (Gay ex Bess.) Batt.
- Artemisia campestris subsp. lednicensis (Spreng.) Greuter & Raab-Straube
- Artemisia campestris subsp. pacifica H.M.Hall & Clem.
- Artemisia campestris subsp. variabilis (Ten.) Greuter
