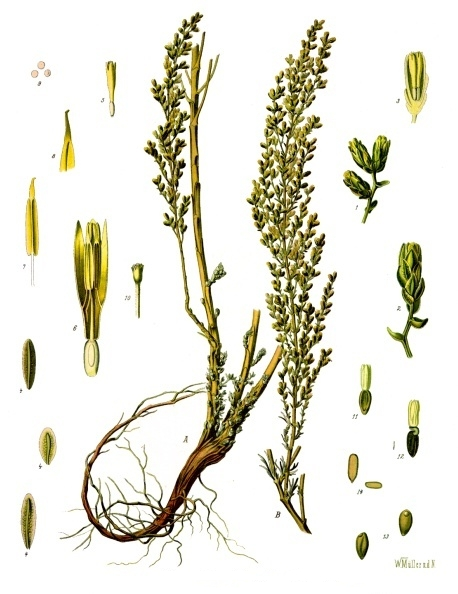
- 1897 illustration

Scientific classification
- Kingdom: Plantae
- Clade: Tracheophytes
- Clade: Angiosperms
- Clade: Eudicots
- Clade: Asterids
- Order: Asterales
- Family: Asteraceae
- Genus: Artemisia
- Species: A. cina

Binomial name
- Artemisia cina Berg & C.F. Schmidt ex Poljakov

= Artemisia cina =

Species of flowering plant

Artemisia cina, commonly known as santonica, Levant wormseed, and wormseed, is an Asian species of herbaceous perennial in the daisy family. Its dried flowerheads are the source of the vermifugic drug santonin since ancient times. Its common names arise from its known ability to expel worms. The powder is grayish-green in colour with an aromatic odour and a bitter taste. Dysphania ambrosioides is another plant with the common name wormseed, called epazote in Mexican cuisine.

The plant is characterised by its spherical pollen grains, which are typical in the Asteraceae; a fibrous layer on anthers; lignified, elongated, hypodermal sclerids; and clusters of calcium oxalate crystals.

It is native to China, Pakistan, Russia, Turkestan, Kazakhstan, and Kyrgyzstan.

It is referenced in the short story "Funes the Memorious" by Jorge Luis Borges.

== Biochemistry ==
In addition to santonin, the above-ground parts of the plant contain betaine, choline, tannins, pigments, and an essential oil. The essential oil is largely composed of 1,8-cineole, but contains a wide variety of other compounds as well. Cineole takes its name in part from the specific name, cina.
