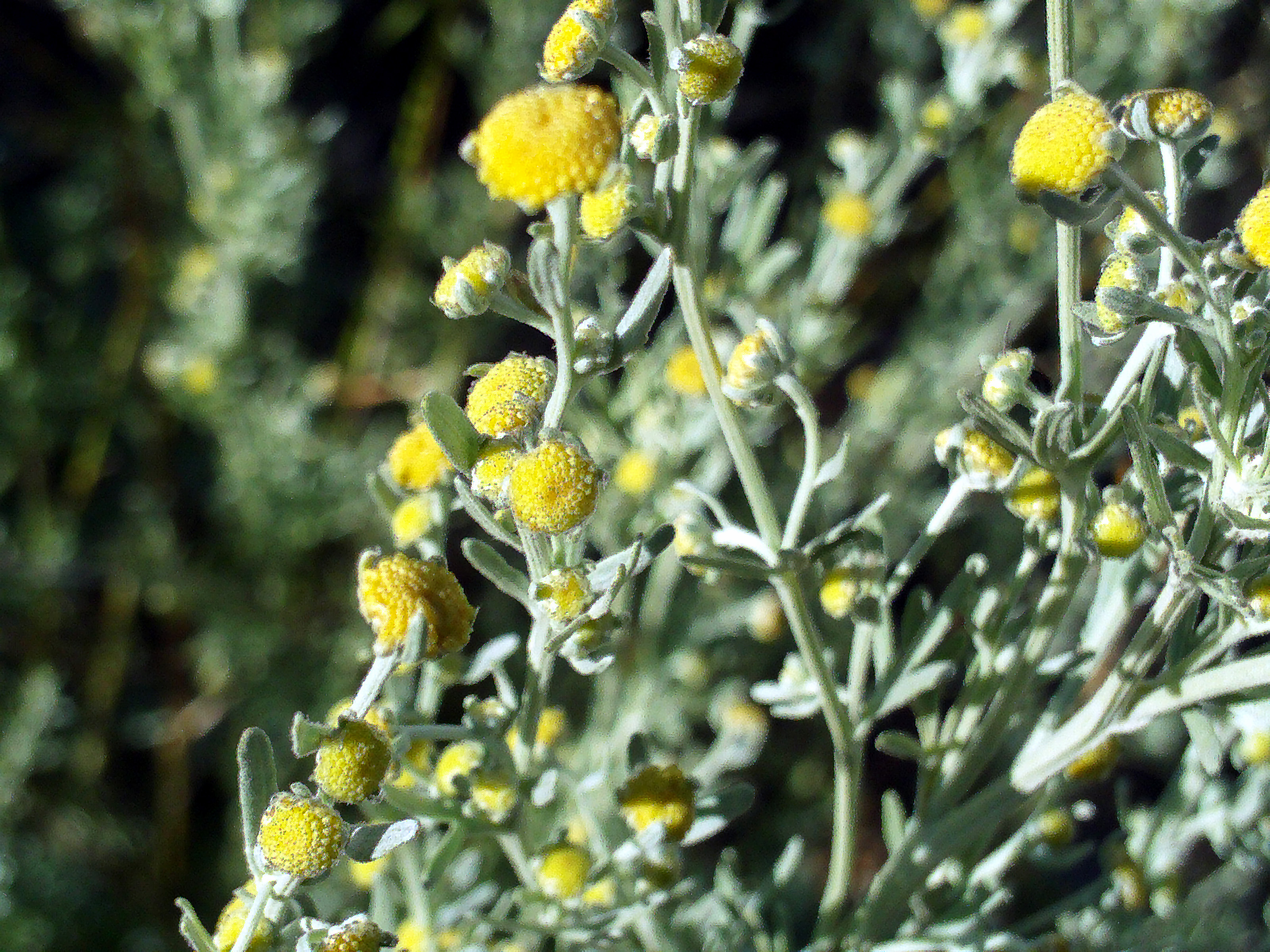
- Artemisia chamaemelifolia stem and inflorescences, Sierra Nevada, Spain

Scientific classification
- Kingdom: Plantae
- Clade: Tracheophytes
- Clade: Angiosperms
- Clade: Eudicots
- Clade: Asterids
- Order: Asterales
- Family: Asteraceae
- Genus: Artemisia
- Species: A. chamaemelifolia

Binomial name
- Artemisia chamaemelifolia Vill., 1779

Synonyms
- Artemisia chamomillifolia Parrot; Artemisia iberica Boiss. ex Boiss. & Buhse; Artemisia stechmanniana Besser

= Artemisia chamaemelifolia =

Species of flowering plant

Artemisia chamaemelifolia is a European and Middle Eastern species of plant in the daisy family.

== Description ==
The species flowering stems are 30–50 centimetres (12–20 in) in length and are cylindrical, erect, and are dark brown in colour. Leaves are pinnatisect, are green coloured and are either hairless or have minimum amount of it. Leaf-lobes are 2–4 millimetres (0.079–0.157 in) by 0.5 millimetres (0.020 in) and are filiform to linear. Its capitula is 4–6 millimetres (0.16–0.24 in) in diameter and is globose and quite ovate. Flowers are yellow in colour and have glabrous corollas.

== Distribution ==
It is found in Bulgaria in western Ponor on Golyama Mogila and Torlovichka Mogila mountains and in Ostriya Vrah village. It is also native to European and Asian mountains such as the Alps, Cantabria, Caucasus, Stara Planina, and in Asia Minor and northern Iran.

== Habitat ==
It can be found growing on grassy and stony landscape, where it reproduces due to its herbaceus nature at the elevation of 1,560 metres (5,120 ft).

== Conservation status ==
Artemisia chamaemelifolia is considered to be Critically endangered due to low population and specification of habitat.
