= Greensboro Fire Department =

Operational area
- Country: United States
- State: North Carolina
- City: Greensboro

Agency overview
- Established: 1884
- Annual calls: 38,952 (2020)
- Employees: 584 (2020)
- Annual budget: $43,129,161 (2014)
- Staffing: Career
- Fire chief: Graham "Jim" Robinson III
- IAFF: 947

Facilities and equipment
- Battalions: 5
- Stations: 26
- Engines: 25
- Trucks: 11
- Rescues: 1
- HAZMAT: 2
- USAR: 1
- Light and air: 1

Website
- Official website
- IAFF website

The Greensboro Fire Department provides fire protection and emergency medical services to the city of Greensboro, North Carolina. The department is responsible for an area of 144 square miles (370 km^{2}) with a population of 275,879.

The Greensboro Fire Department was started as an all volunteer fire department in 1884 with the Steam Fire Engine Company Number 1. Due to population growth and concerns over resource management, the department transitioned to career members in 1926.

== Stations and apparatus ==
As of August 2022 this is the current list of apparatus in the Greensboro Fire Department:

Fire Station Number	Address	Engine Company	Ladder Company	Specialized Unit	Battalion Chief Unit	Battalion
1	1514 N. Church St	Engine 1		Air 1	Battalion 1	1
2	5109 N. Church St	Engine 2				5
4	401 Gorrell St	Engine 4				2
5	1401 Westover Terrace	Engine 5	Ladder 5	Rescue 5		5
7	1064 Gatewood Ave	Engine 7	Ladder 7			1
8	2201 Coliseum Blvd	Engine 8				3
10	4208 Gate City Blvd	Engine 10	Ladder 10			3
11	2602 S. Elm-Eugene St	Engine 11	Ladder 11	HazMat 71, 271	Battalion 2	2
14	3633 Summit Ave	Engine 14	Ladder 14			1
17	6405 Old Oak Ridge Rd	Engine 17		Foam Task Force / ARFF		4
18	5903 Ballinger Rd	Engine 18		ARFF Team	Battalion 4	4
19	6900 Downwind Rd	Engine 19		Foam Task Force / ARFF		4
20	8404 W. Market St	Engine 20	Ladder 20	Foam Task Force / ARFF		4
21	2870 Horse Pen Creek Rd	Engine 21	Ladder 21	HazMat 72, 272		4
40	1805 Pisgah Church Rd	Engine 40			Battalion 5	5
41	4504 Lake Brandt Rd	Engine 41		Bike Team		5
43	4854 Lake Jeanette Rd	Engine 43	Ladder 43			5
48	1400 Vandalia Rd	Engine 48				3
49	4302 W. Friendly Ave	Engine 49				3
Guilford County Station 50	6498 Franz Warner Pkwy	Engine 50				2
52	1000 Meadowood St	Engine 52	Ladder 52		Battalion 3	3
53	2013 Willow Rd	Engine 53				2
56	820 Franklin Blvd	Engine 56				1
57	1539 Mt. Hope Church Rd	N/A	Ladder 57			2
59	3803 Reedy Fork Parkway	N/A	Ladder 59			1
61	105 W. Vandalia Rd	Engine 61				2
63	4306 Burlington Rd	Engine 63		Drone Team		1
