= Chartreuse (color) =

Shade of yellow-green color

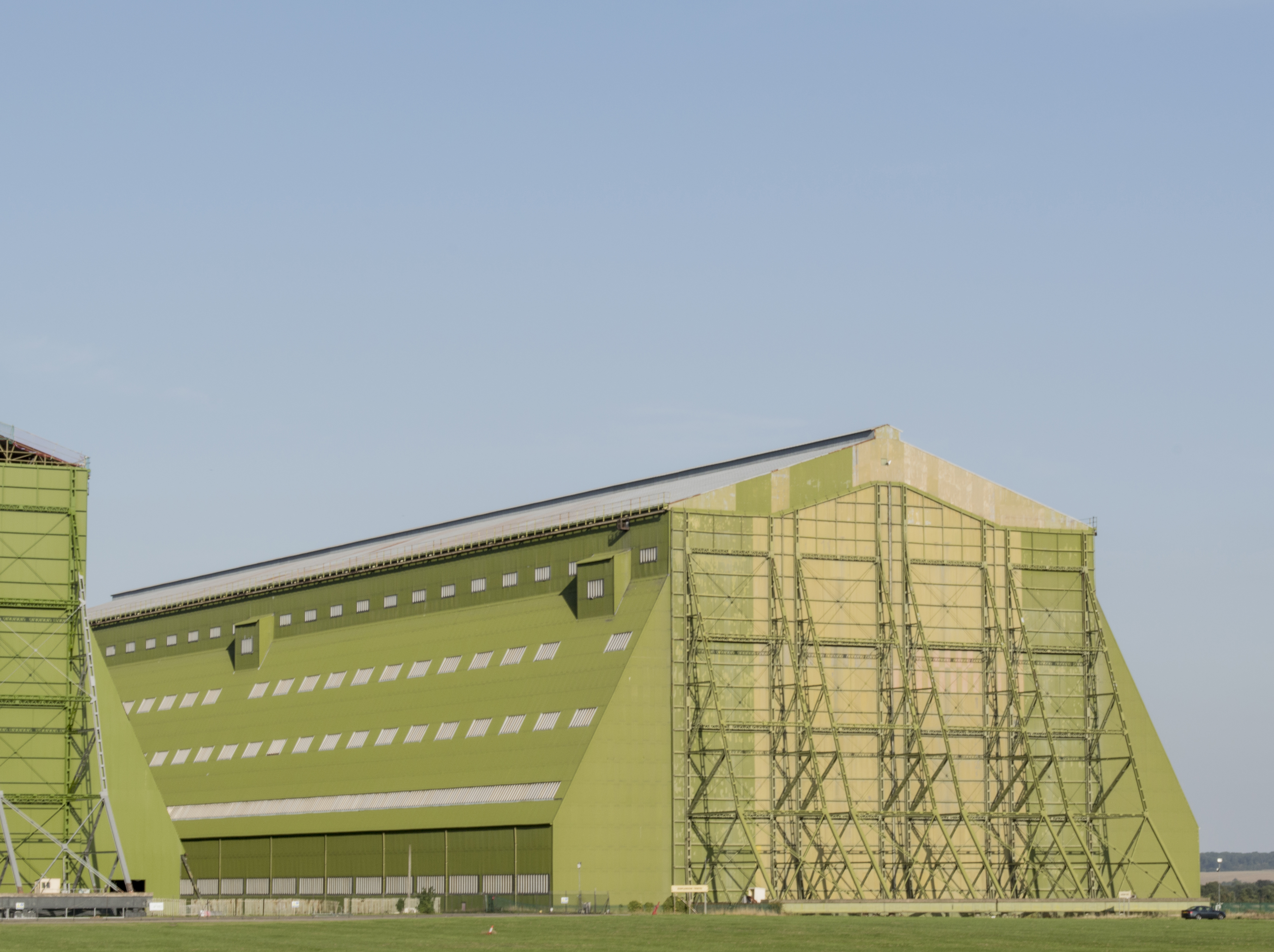
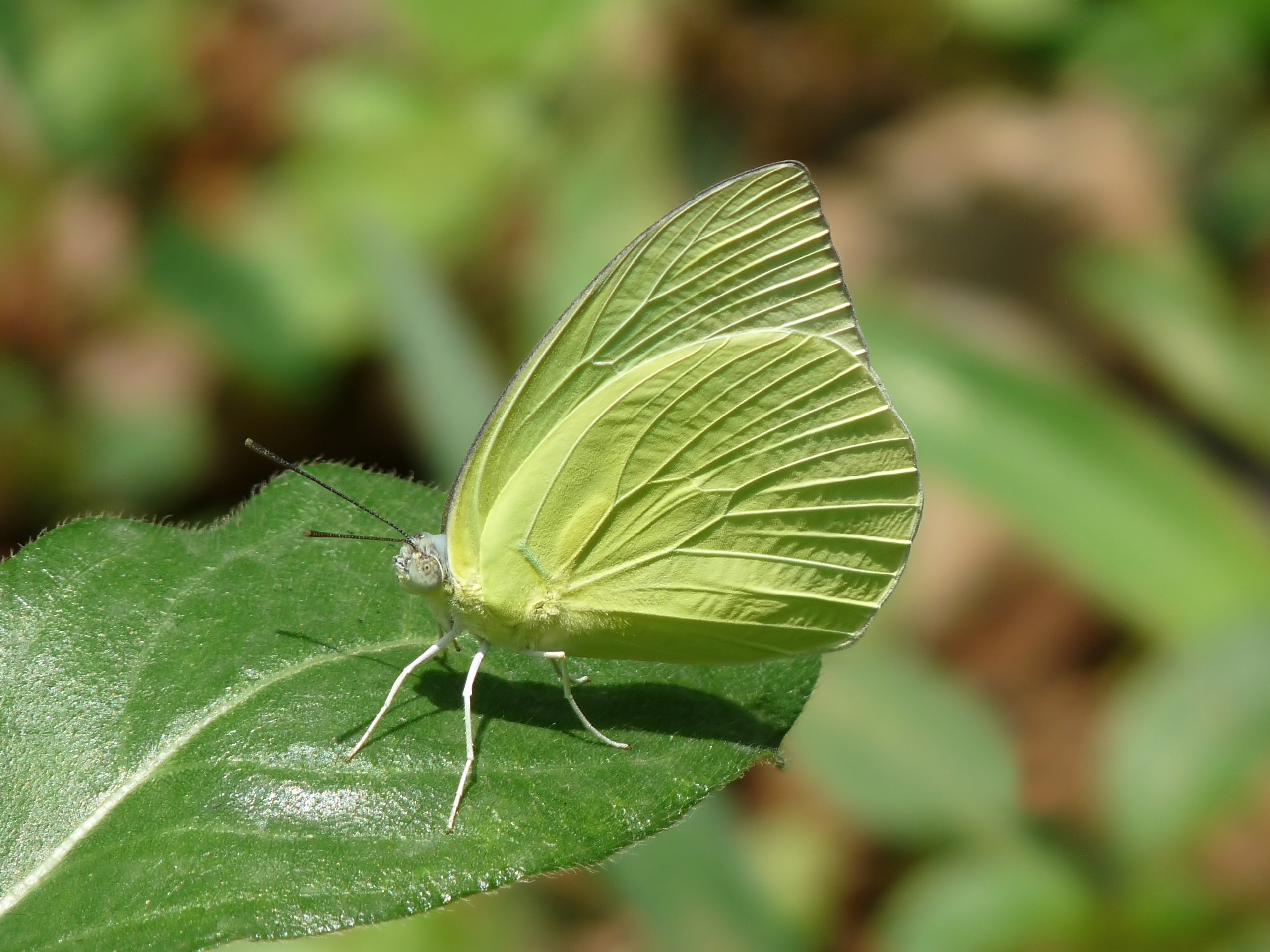
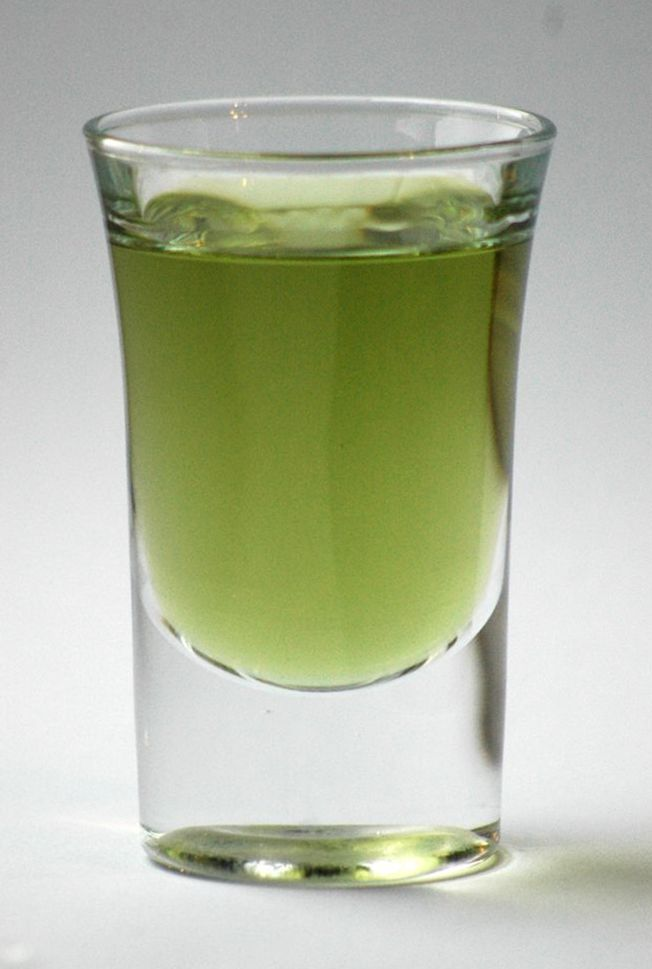
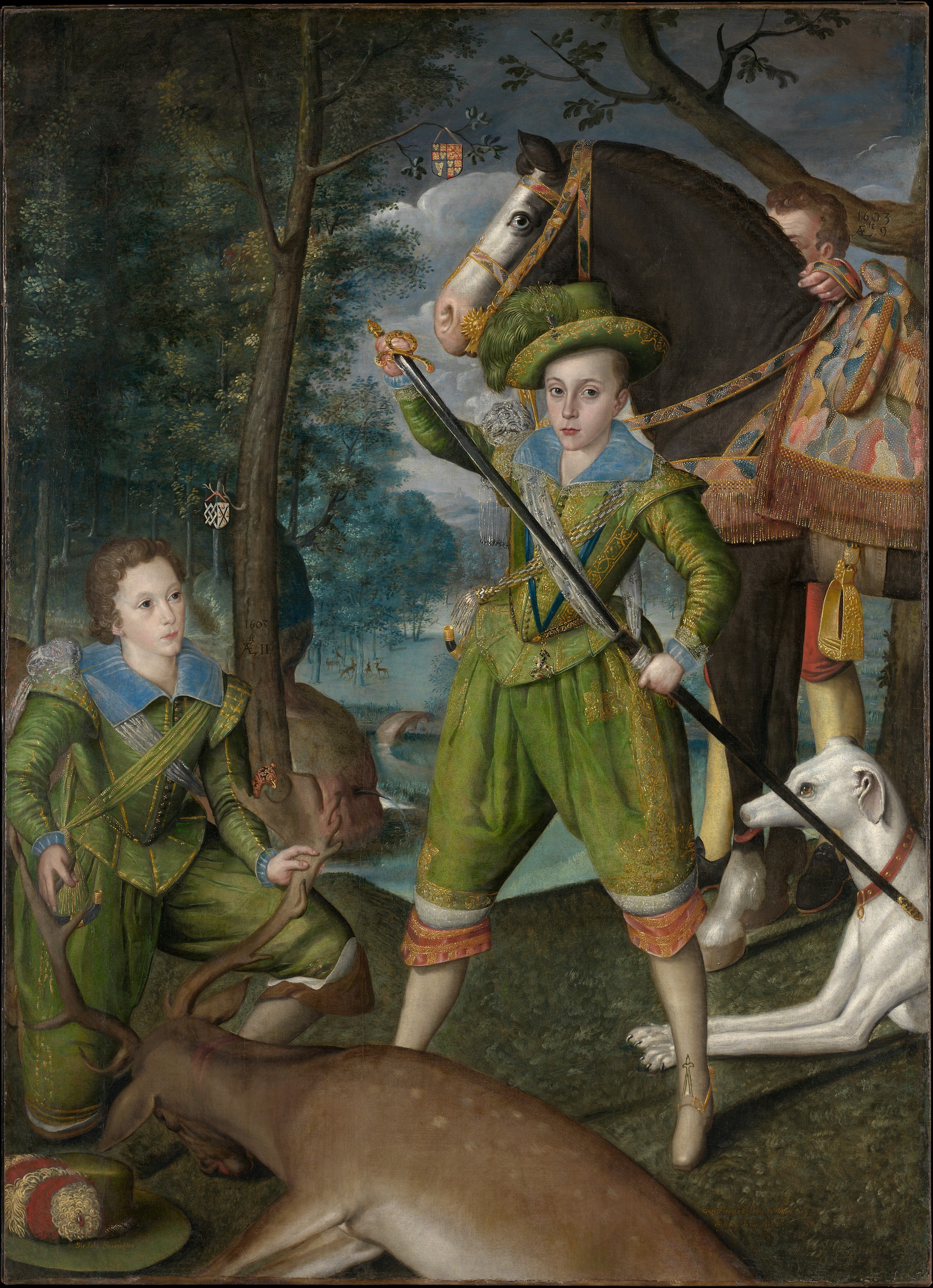
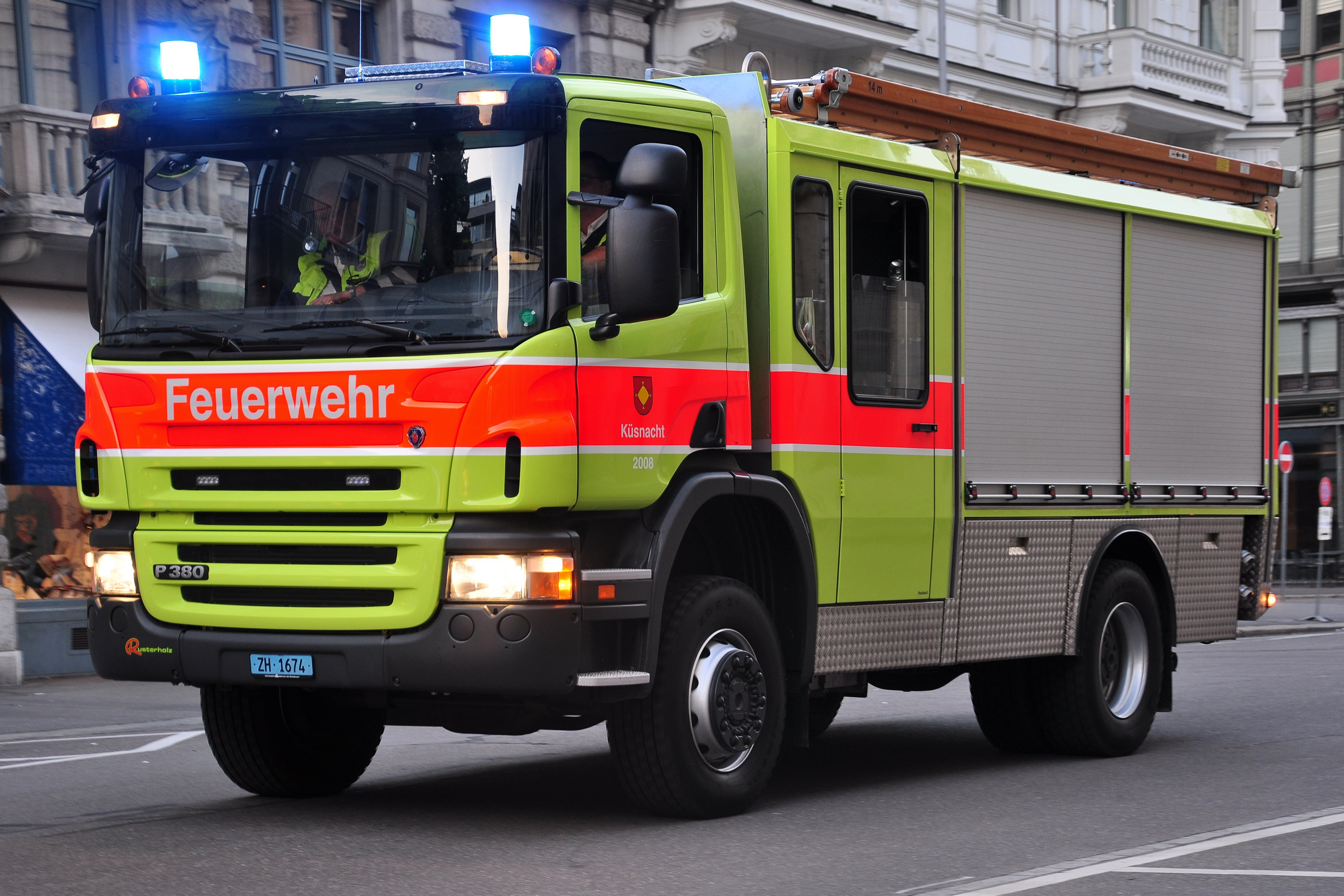
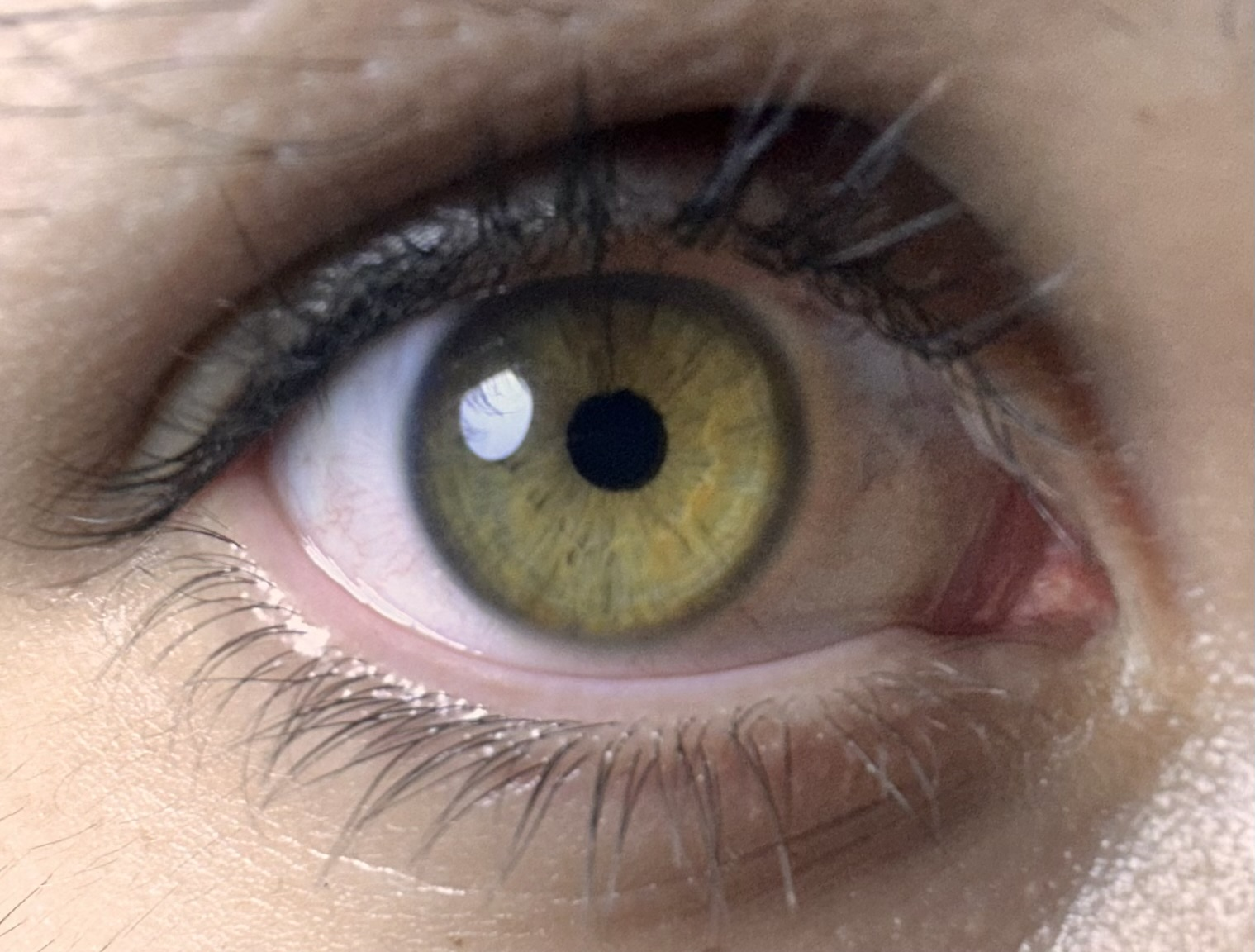
- Clockwise, from top left: Cardington Airfield; Catopsilia pomona; Portrait of Henry Frederick, Prince of Wales; Chartreuse-colored eye; Fire engine in Zürich; A shot glass of Chartreuse liqueur.

Color coordinates
- Hex triplet: #80FF00
- sRGB^{B} (r, g, b): (128, 255, 0)
- HSV (h, s, v): (90°, 100%, 100%)
- CIELCh_{uv} (L, C, h): (90, 123, 119°)
- Source: Convertcase
- ISCC–NBS descriptor: Vivid yellowish green
- B: Normalized to [0–255] (byte); H: Normalized to [0–100] (hundred)

Variation
- Chartreuse Yellow

Chartreuse (US: /ʃɑːrˈtruːz, -ˈtruːs/, UK: /-ˈtrɜːz/, French: [ʃaʁtʁøz]) is a color between yellow and green also referred to as yellow-green or greenish yellow. It was named because of its resemblance to the French liqueur green chartreuse, introduced in 1764. Similarly, chartreuse yellow is a yellow color mixed with a small amount of green, named after the drink yellow chartreuse. The wavelength and frequency of chartreuse is near 547.5 nm or 547.5 THz.

During the 2000s, yellow-green, as well as other shades of bright green like lime green, became very popular when various tech companies used it in office decor and other products, and with the popularity and success of the Shrek franchise.

== History and etymology ==
The name Carthusian is derived from the Chartreuse Mountains in the French Prealps: Bruno of Cologne built his first hermitage in a valley of these mountains. These names were adapted to the English charterhouse, meaning a Carthusian monastery. These monks started producing Chartreuse liqueur in 1737.

== In nature ==
Yellow-green algae, also called xanthophytes, are a class of algae in the Heterokontophyta division. Most live in fresh water, but some are found in marine and soil habitats. They vary from single-celled flagellates to simple colonial and filamentous forms. Unlike other heterokonts, the plastids of yellow-green algae do not contain fucoxanthin, which is why they have a lighter color.

== In popular culture ==
=== The song Chartreuse ===
Introduced by rhythm and blues bandleader Louis Jordan and His Tympany Five in 1950, the song (You dyed your hair) Chartreuse was written by J. Leslie McFarland and Billy Moore according to the record collector database Secondhand Songs and the record collector website Discogs. It was the B-side of the Decca Records 45 rpm release "Lemonade". It was also recorded later the same year by Gordon MacRae with harmony singing by The Ewing Sisters and orchestra led by Frank De Vol.

In the tongue-in-cheek lyric, the singer threatens to tell the mother of his "freckle-faced pug-nosed cutie" about the change in hair color. "You went too far in that beauty booth, when you died your hair chartreuse," he says.

=== Traffic safety ===
Chartreuse yellow is used on traffic safety vests to provide increased visibility for employees working near traffic. The chartreuse yellow background material, together with a retro-reflective satisfy the ANSI 107-2010 standard since 1999. High-visibility clothing ANSI Standards were adopted as an Occupational Safety and Health Act (United States) requirement in 2008.

=== Film and television ===
The 1960 Universal film Chartroose Caboose featured a "bright green"–colored train car.

In the 2002 Blue's Clues episode "Colors Everywhere!", Blue and Joe meet a physical representation of the colour chartreuse, who takes the form of a glob of paint. Chartreuse demonstrates that her colour is made by mixing yellow and green.

=== Firefighting ===
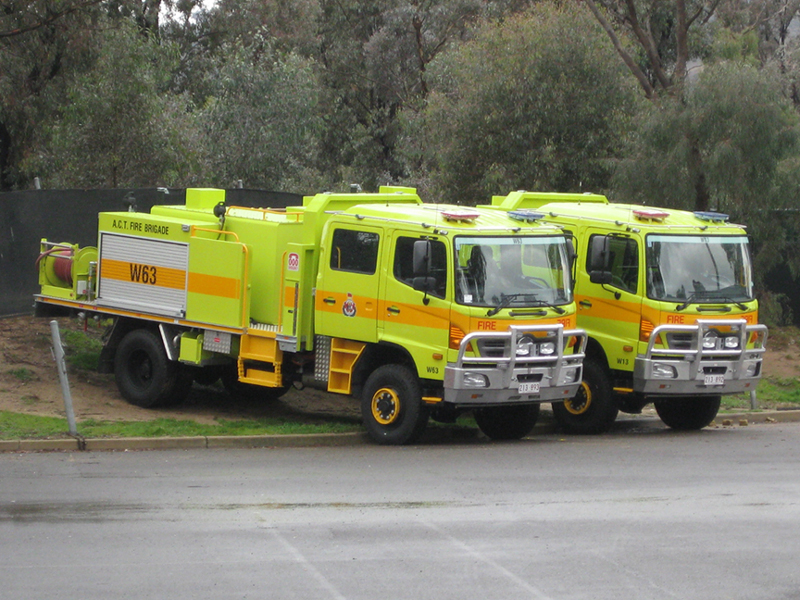
ACT Fire and Rescue tankers in chartreuse green

Since about 1973, a sort of fluorescent chartreuse green has been adopted as the color of fire engines in parts of the United States and elsewhere. The use of chartreuse fire engines began when New York ophthalmologist Stephen Solomon produced research claiming that sparkling bright lime-green paint would boost the night-time visibility of emergency vehicles compared to those painted the traditional fire engine red. The reason for this is the Purkinje effect, i.e., the cones do not function as efficiently in dim light, so red objects appear to be black. In Australia, this form of chartreuse yellow is also known as "ACT yellow" as this is the color of the fire engines in the Australian Capital Territory.

In 2009, the American firefighting standard NFPA 1901 was updated to specify that the rears of firefighting vehicles and ambulances were to have retroreflective chevron striping, that was an alternating pattern of red and either yellow or yellow-green stripes.

=== Music ===
Charli XCX's 2024 album Brat has a chartreuse-colored album cover with the text "brat".

=== Other ===
Chartreuse is popularly used as an accent color in the Japanese manga series The Guy She Was Interested in Wasn't a Guy at All by Sumiko Arai, with the author revealing its use was a last-minute addition.

== See also ==
- Lime (color)
- Lists of colors
