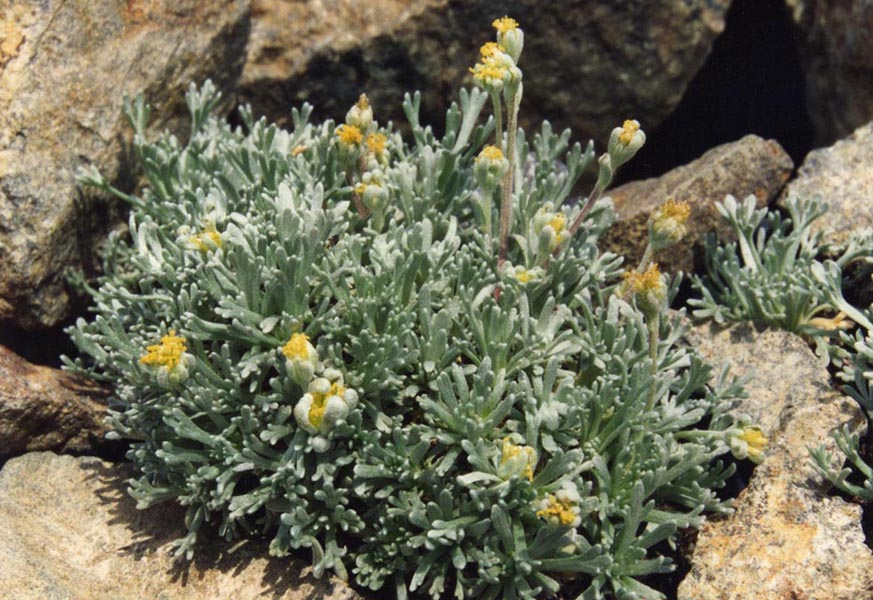

Scientific classification
- Kingdom: Plantae
- Clade: Tracheophytes
- Clade: Angiosperms
- Clade: Eudicots
- Clade: Asterids
- Order: Asterales
- Family: Asteraceae
- Genus: Artemisia
- Species: A. umbelliformis

Binomial name
- Artemisia umbelliformis Lam., 1783

= Artemisia umbelliformis =

Species of flowering plant

Artemisia umbelliformis also known as white genepi, alpine wormwood and genepì blanco is a small herb of the family Asteraceae.

== Usage ==
It is sought for the production of liquor Génépi. The leaves are used in the preparation of a tea and are sometimes also used as a condiment.

=== Synonyms ===
- Artemisia eriantha Ten.
- Artemisia gabriellae Br.-Bl. (1945)
- Artemisia genipi subsp. eriantha
- Artemisia laxa Fritsch (1893)
- Artemisia laxiflora St-Lager (1889)
- Artemisia mutellina Vill. (1779)
- Artemisia oligantha Miégeville (1872)
- Artemisia petrosa (Baumg.) Jan
- Artemisia villarsii Gren. & Godr.

== Hybrids ==
In Italy this species can hybridize easily with Artemisia genipi Weber, Artemisia glacialis L., Artemisia nitida Bertol., and Artemisia lanata Willd .. Other interspecific hybrids:

- Artemisia × albertii Petitmengin (1906) - Hybrid with: Artemisia absinthium
- Artemisia × pampaninii Vaccari (1904) - Hybrid with: Artemisia nana
- Artemisia × perrieri Petitmengin (1906) - Hybrid with: Artemisia campestris
- Artemisia × seileri FO Wolf (1892) - Hybrid with: Artemisia glacialis
- Artemisia × sylviana FO Wolf (1892) - Hybrid with: Artemisia genipi
