= Camden Fire Department =

Fire department in Camden, New Jersey, US

Camden Fire Department (CFD)
Operational area
- State: New Jersey
- City: Camden

Agency overview
- Established: 1869
- Annual calls: ~10,000
- Employees: ~200

Facilities and equipment
- Divisions: 1
- Battalions: 2
- Stations: 5
- Engines: 5
- Ladders: 3
- Squads: 1 (rescue-pumper)
- Rescues: 1
- HAZMAT: 1
- USAR: 1
- Fireboats: 1
- Light and air: 1

Officially organized in 1869, the Camden Fire Department (CFD) is the oldest paid fire department in New Jersey and is among the oldest paid fire departments in the United States. In 1916, the CFD was the first in the United States that had an all-motorized fire apparatus fleet. Layoffs have forced the city to rely on assistance from suburban fire departments in surrounding communities when firefighters from all 10 fire companies are unavailable due to calls.

The Camden Fire Department currently operates out of five fire stations, organized into two battalions. Each battalion is commanded by a battalion chief, who in turn reports to a deputy chief. The CFD currently operates five engine companies, one squad (rescue-pumper), three ladder companies, and one rescue company, as well as several other special, support, and reserve units. The department's fireboat is docked on the Delaware River. Currently, the quarters of Squad 7, a rescue-pumper, located at 1115 Kaighn Avenue, has been closed for renovations. Squad 7 is currently operating out of the Broadway Station. Since 2010, the Camden Fire Department has suffered severe economic cutbacks, including company closures and staffing cuts.

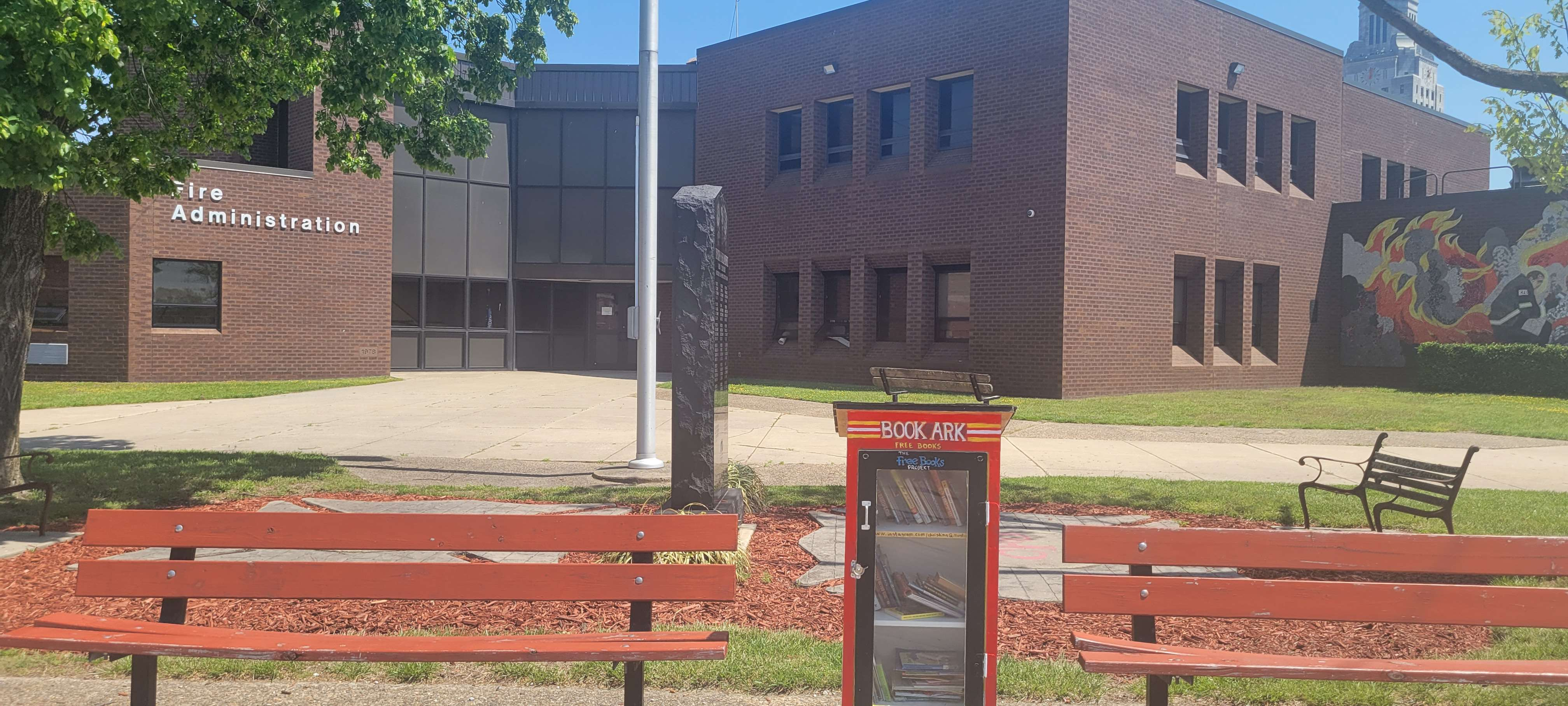
The Fire Administration Building on N 3rd Street in Camden, NJ

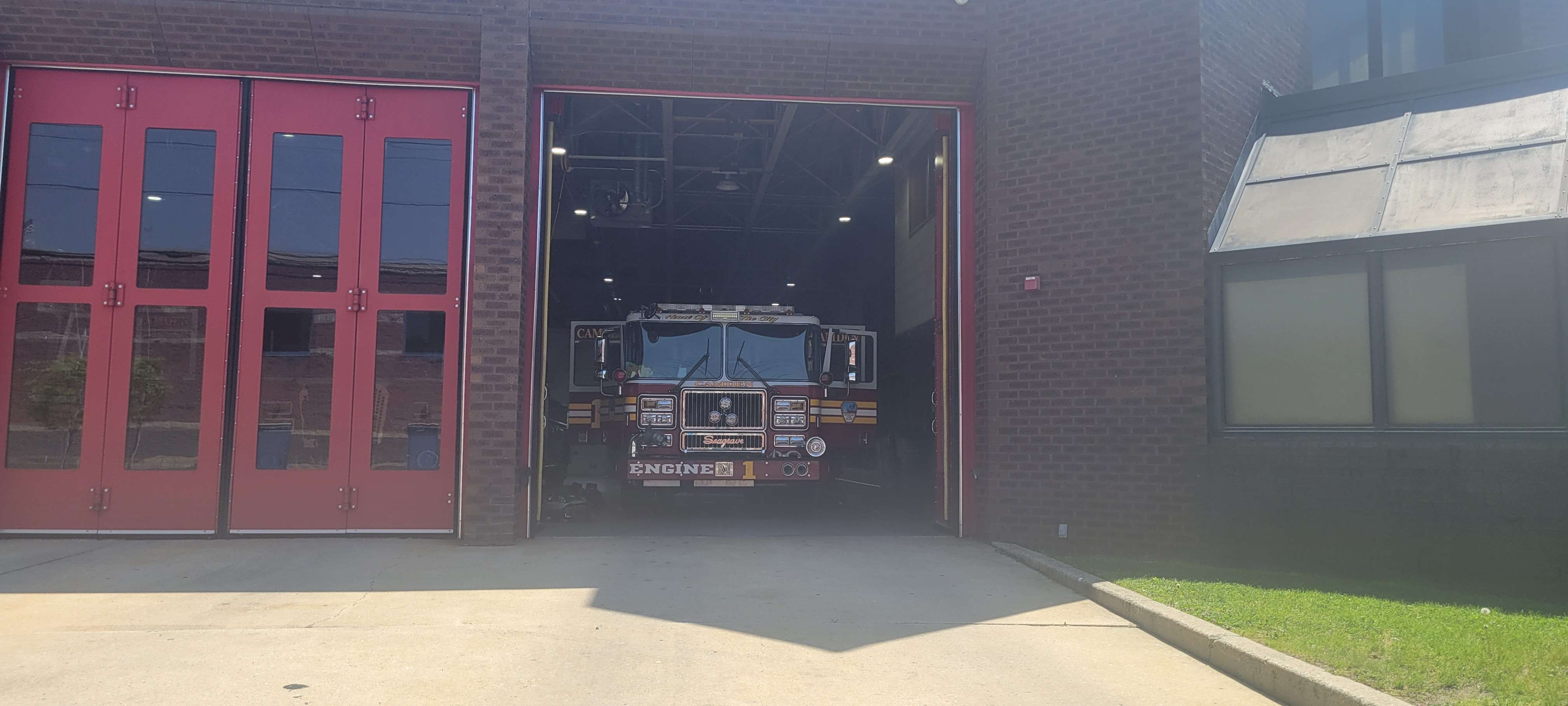
Fire Engine at N 3rd St. Fire Administration Building.

== Fire station locations and operations ==
The following is a list of all fire stations and company locations in the city of Camden: There is an apparatus fleet of 5 Engines, 1 Squad (rescue-pumper), 1 Rescue Company, 1 Haz-Mat Unit, 1 Collapse Rescue Unit, 3 Ladder Companies, 1 Fireboat, 1 Air Cascade Unit, 1 Chief of department, 3 Deputy Chiefs, 1 Chief Fire Marshall and 2 Battalion Chiefs Units. Each shift is commanded by two Battalion Chiefs and one Deputy Chief.

Engine company or Squad Company	Ladder Company	Special Unit	Car or Battalion Chief Unit	Battalion	Address	Neighborhood
Engine 1, Engine 6	Ladder 1	Fireboat 1(Docked in Delaware River)	Car 1 (Chief of Department), Car 2 (Deputy Chief), Car 3 (Deputy Chief), Car 4 (Deputy Chief), Car 5 (Chief Fire Marshal)	1	4 N. 3rd St.	Center City
Squad 7 (rescue-pumper)	Ladder 2(Tiller)	Rescue 1, Collapse Rescue 1, Haz-Mat. Unit 1	Battalion Chief 1	1	1301 Broadway	South Camden
Engine 9	Tower Ladder 3		Battalion Chief 2	2	3 N. 27th St.	East Camden
Engine 10		Air Cascade Unit		1	2500 Morgan Blvd.	South Camden
Engine 11				2	901 N. 27th St.	Cramer Hill
