= Stellina =

Stellina may refer to:

- Stellina (astronomy), a digital electronic telescope
- Stellina (liqueur), an herbal liqueur
- Stellina (TV series), an Italian animated television series
