= Génépi =

Traditional herbal liqueur or aperitif in the Alpine regions of Europe

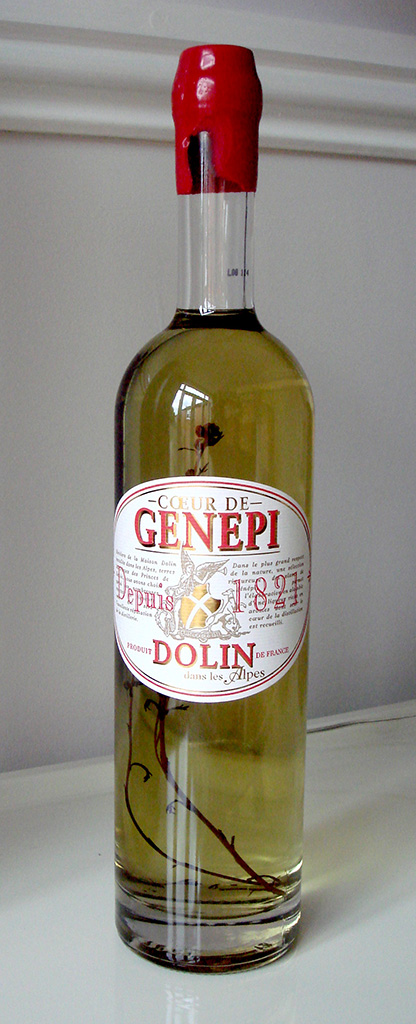
A bottle of Coeur de Génépi

Génépi or génépy (French: [ʒenepi]) is a traditional herbal liqueur or apéritif popularized in the Alpine regions. Genepi also refers to alpine plants of the genus Artemisia (commonly called wormwood) that is used to make a liqueur in the French region of Savoy and in the Italian regions of Aosta Valley and Piedmont, where the Artemisia génépi plants grow and where the beverage is commonly produced.

Génépi liqueur is related to absinthe in that its namesake botanicals are of the genus Artemisia, but like Chartreuse, it is a liqueur (contains sugar) and traditionally taken neat. Like many European herbal liqueurs, especially those used as digestifs, the flavor of génépi can be an acquired taste. It is less sweet than many digestifs, and the flavor imparted by the herbs is reminiscent of chamomile or feverfew. It is naturally light olive to pale gold in color. Cheaper versions may be made bright green through the addition of food coloring.

Because génépi is produced by steeping the aromatic flowering tops of select Artemisia sp. in a clear alcohol, it is not a spirit liquor such as absinthe and gin, which are produced by re-distilling botanicals in alcohol.

== Etymology ==
The word génépi is similar to other European words such as ginepro (Italian), juniper (English), jenever (Dutch), and genièvre (French), from the Latin iuni-pero meaning “evergreen.” It is also associated with the Savoy region. The Petit Larousse Illustré says that génépi "is the generic name of different aromatic plants typical of the Alps". Zingarelli defines the term "genepí" by distinguishing between two meanings. The first refers to the plant, an unspecified member of the genus Artemisia, while the second refers to the beverage resulting from it and from other Alpine plants. The Enciclopedia Espasa contends that "genippi" is the native Alpine word for a particular group of plants of the genus Artemisia and lists their names and characteristics.

French writers distinguish between two kinds of génépi: white or female génépi (botanically A. mutellina, also known as A. umbelliformis or A.rupestris All., A. laxa Lamarck and A. eriantha Tem., among others) and black or male génépi (botanically A. genipi, also known as A. spicata Baumg. Wulfen ex Jacq. and A. rupestris Vill., among others).

== Geographical origins ==
The wormwoods known as génépi are endemic to the Alps and Pyrenees, but can also be found in other mountainous regions in the western and central north Mediterranean. However, in the strictest sense the name génépi applies only to those members of the genus Artemisia growing in the Savoy region known as Genepi. The European Union protects French génépi liqueur under its Protected Geographical Status system.

Under the EU legislation the name génépi is limited in use to those French products, but unlike under systems of appellation, there are few regulations or limitations on how the product is produced or what ingredients are used in making it. A beverage may be labelled and sold as génépi only if it complies with general EU requirements for liqueur, such as a minimum sugar content (expressed as invert sugar) of 100 grams per litre.

Swiss chocolate is sold in France (and no doubt elsewhere) with the wording in English (as well as in French and German) "Milk Chocolate with a Swiss Genepi Liquor filling".

== Raw material ==
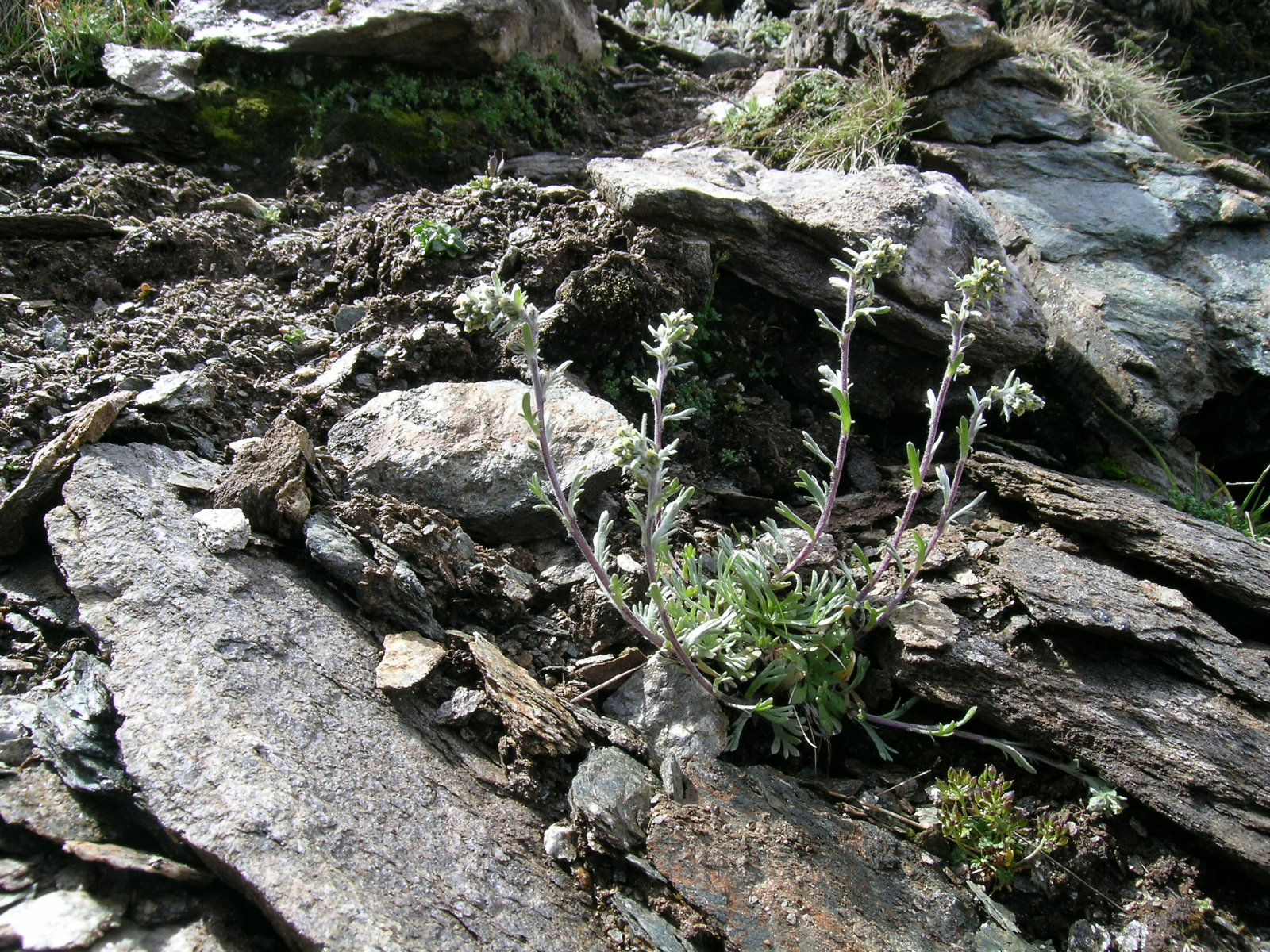
Alpine wormwood Artemisia genipi, the source of génépi

For making génépi liqueur, several species of Artemisia (the genus of the wormwoods) are particularly valued, including A. genipi (black génépi) and A. umbelliformis (white génépi) - either of which being sometimes referred to as A. rupestris. The botanical identification of the plants traditionally collected for use in making génépi liqueur is complicated by scientific reclassification work in the genus Artemisia, spurred by recent trends in molecular assay and cladistics, that has resulted in the decline in use (among academics) of common names used in traditional literature.

It is likely that a wide range of wormwoods native to the mountainous areas of Spain, France, Switzerland and Italy have been used to make the liqueur, with personal taste, tradition and availability shaping the selection. According to Stephen Gould, "Any liquor/liqueur made with any member of the artemisia family, except artemisia ab. (Grand wormwood) would be considered a Genepi ..."

Other species known to have been used at one time or another in producing génépi are A. glacialis, A. pontica and A. borealis. Flowers of "Alsem der Alpen", the botanically related Achillea erba-rotta subsp. moschata known in English as musk milfoil, are sometimes added or used to substitute entirely for one or more of the génépi species. Collectively, these various Alpine plants that blossom at high altitudes during July and August are known in German as "Edelraute".

== Génépi at home ==
Génépi can be made at home through the simple addition of prepared herbs to vodka or grain alcohol. The chopped, dried wormwood flowers are sold in southwestern Europe in small sachets similar to tea bags. Home-brewing instructions, as well as ingredients, can be found online. For the more adventurous, the flowers and herbs can be harvested in July and August. After drying and chopping, the herbal mass can be enclosed in cheesecloth for steeping. A generic recipe for a liter of génépi would require forty flowers and forty sugar lumps to be added to 40% alcohol by volume.

== Commercial génépi ==
There are myriad of brands of génépi liqueur in commerce, most being of small production volume and limited distribution. Additionally, there are a number of commercial liqueurs that resemble génépi or share common ingredients, perhaps the most notable being Chartreuse produced by the Carthusian monks in the mountains beyond Grenoble. Conversely, numerous small producers throughout the French region of Savoy and the Italian region of Val d'Aosta have occasionally bottled and made available their local products, and many restaurateurs in those regions produce and sell their own.

== Literature ==
- Marie-Claude Delahaye: Le Génépi. Equinoxe, 2008, ISBN 978-2-84135-545-7
