= Light and air unit =

Specialized firefighting apparatus

An air and light unit, also known as a breathing support unit or mobile air unit, is a specialized firefighting apparatus used by first responders to provide supplemental lighting and self-contained breathing apparatus cylinders and cylinder filling services at the scene of an emergency. During prolonged incidents surrounding an immediate danger to life or health environment, first responders working in unsafe environments wear a self-contained breathing apparatus. The depleted air cylinders within the breathing apparatus must be replaced and refilled throughout the incident. The air and light unit can refill the cylinders while in the field using an onboard air compressor and cascade system.

In the United States, Chapter 24 of National Fire Protection Association Regulation 1901 outlines specifications for any air system mounted on firefighting apparatus.

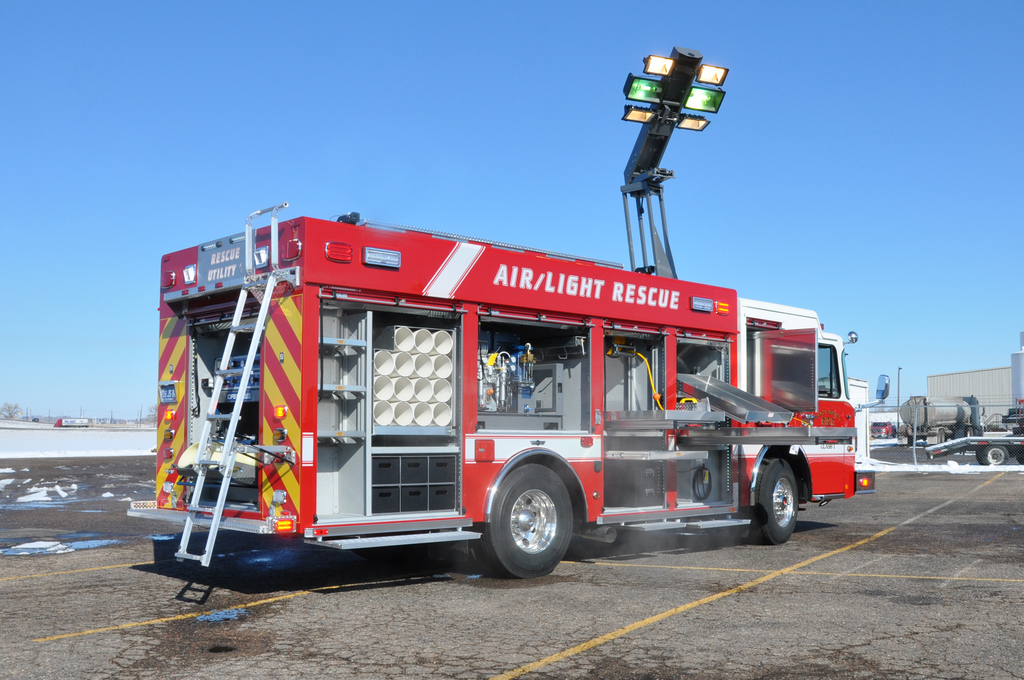
A Santa Monica Fire Department Air and Light unit

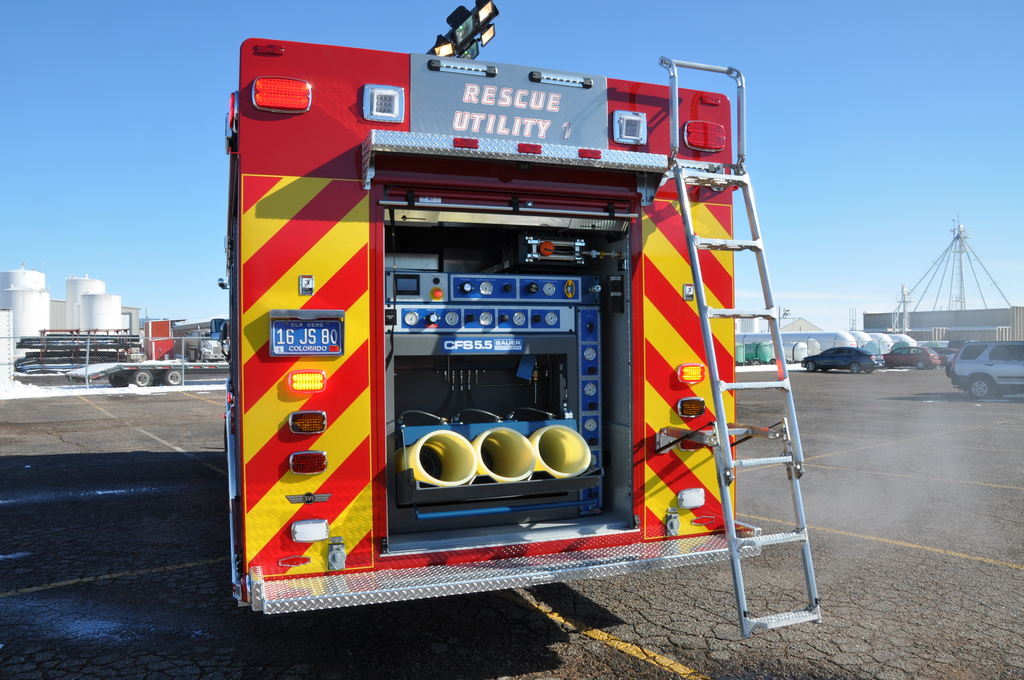
The SCBA bottle filler on the back of SMFD Air and Light 1

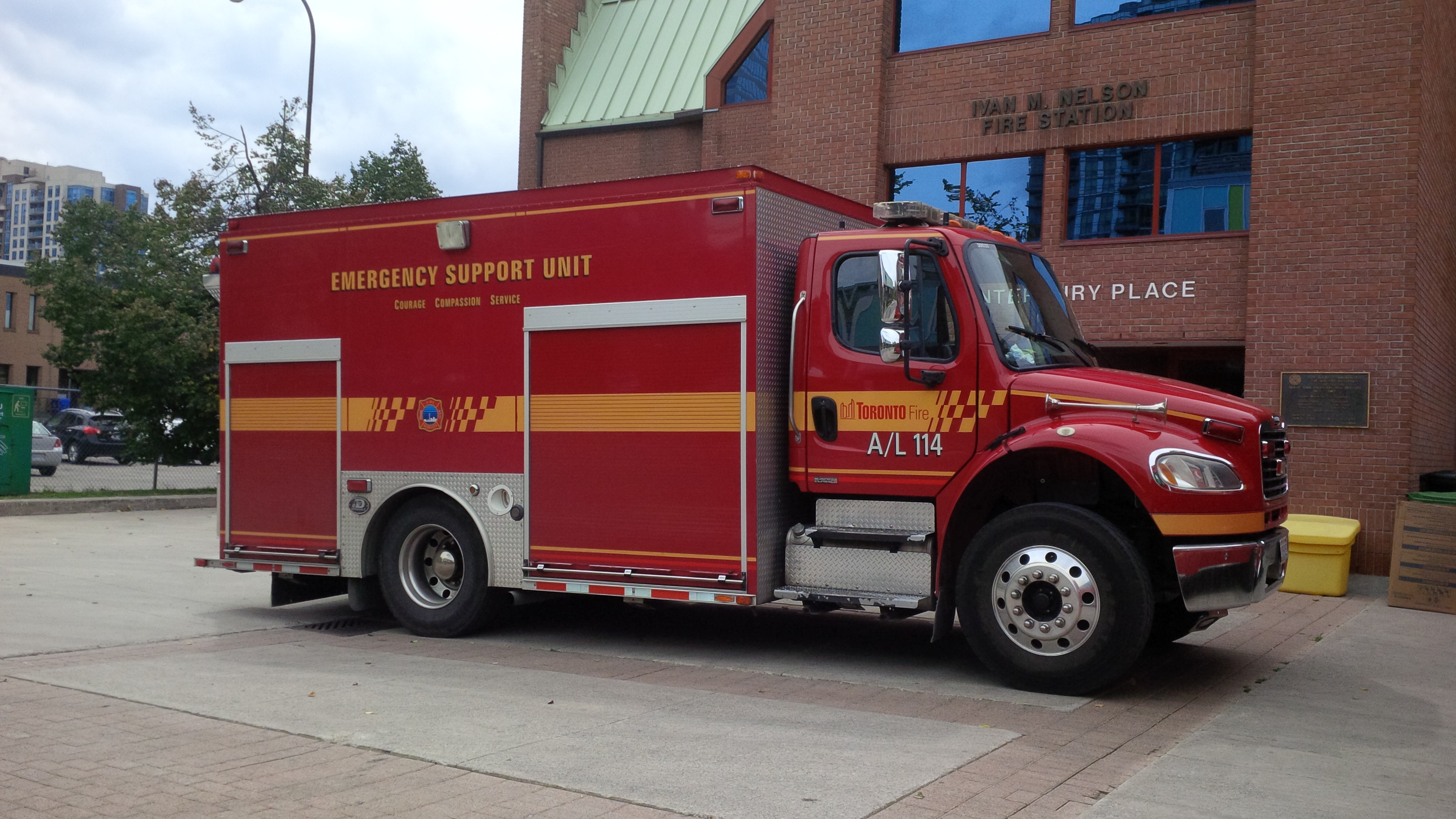
A Toronto Fire Services Air and Light unit
