= Cloister (cocktail) =

Gin cocktail

- Ingredients: 1.5 oz gin (6 parts); 0.5 oz yellow Chartreuse (2 parts); 0.5 oz grapefruit juice (2 parts); 0.25 oz lemon juice (1 part); 0.25 oz simple syrup (1 part)
- Standard drinkware: Champagne coupe
- Standard garnish: Grapefruit twist or lemon twist
- Preparation: Combine ingredients with ice in cocktail shaker; shake well, then strain into cocktail glass, pouring over ice.

The cloister is a cocktail made from gin, grapefruit juice, lemon juice, and chartreuse. The cocktail has been cited as a good introduction to the herbal-infused liqueur.

== See also ==
- List of cocktails
