= Chartreuse (liqueur) =

French liqueur brand

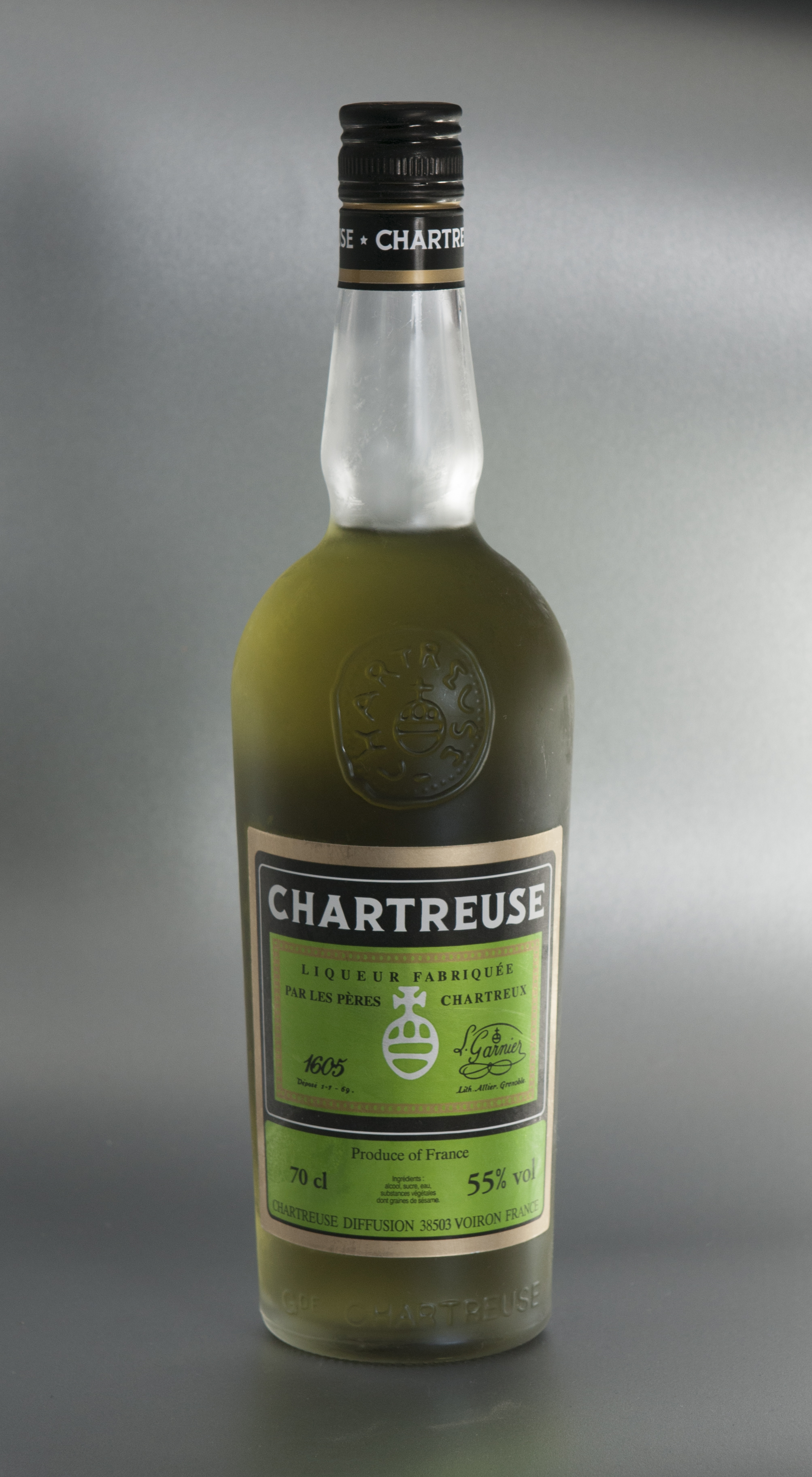
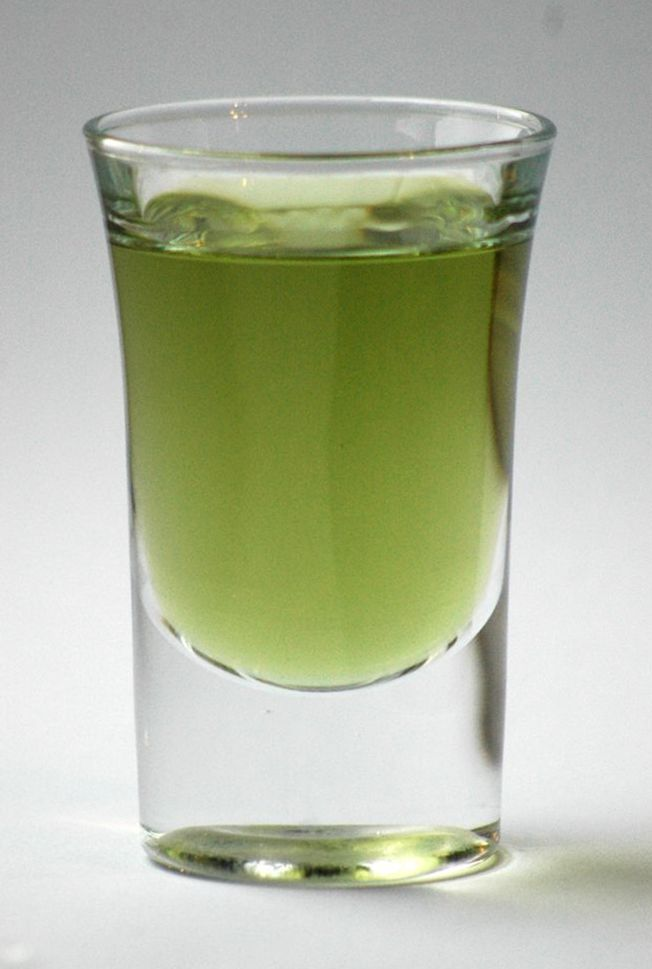
- A bottle of green Chartreuse A shot of green Chartreuse
- Type: Liqueur
- Manufacturer: Carthusian monks
- Origin: France
- Introduced: 1764
- Alcohol by volume: 40–69%
- Proof (US): 80–138° US / 70-120¾° UK
- Color: Chartreuse
- Flavor: Herbal
- Website: www.chartreuse.fr

Chartreuse (US: /ʃɑːrˈtruːz, -ˈtruːs/, UK: /-ˈtrɜːz/, French: [ʃaʁtʁøz]) is a French herbal liqueur that has been made by Carthusian monks since 1737, reportedly according to instructions set out in a manuscript given to them by François Annibal d'Estrées in 1605. It was named after the monks' Grande Chartreuse monastery, located in the Chartreuse Mountains north of Grenoble, France. Today the liqueur is produced in their distillery in nearby Aiguenoire. It is composed of distilled alcohol aged with 130 herbs, plants and flowers, and sweetened, though the exact recipe is known only to select monks. The color chartreuse is named after the drink.

== History ==
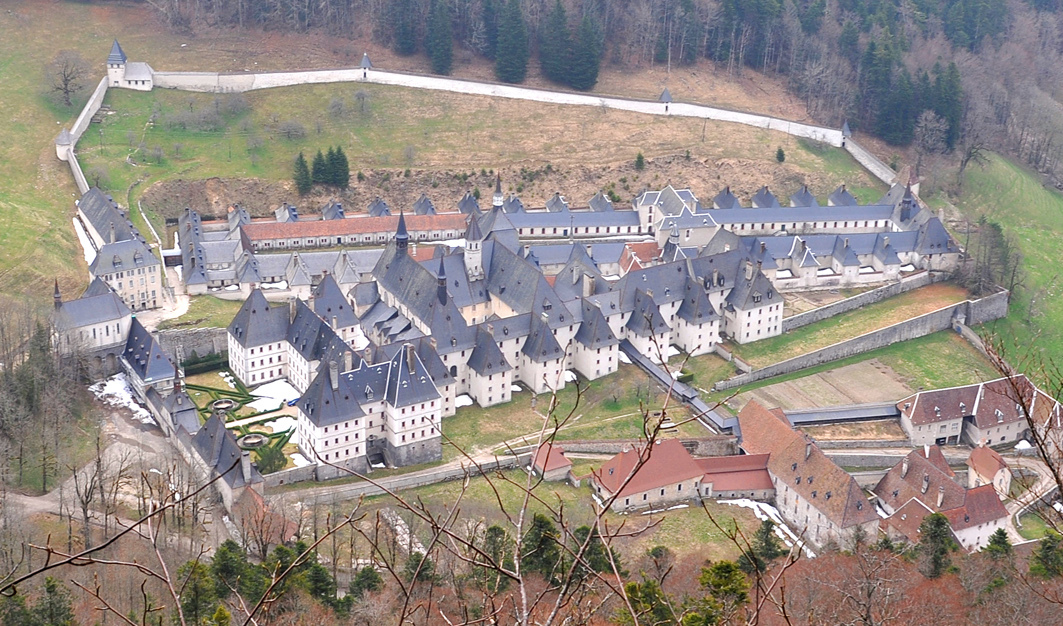
The Grande Chartreuse monastery

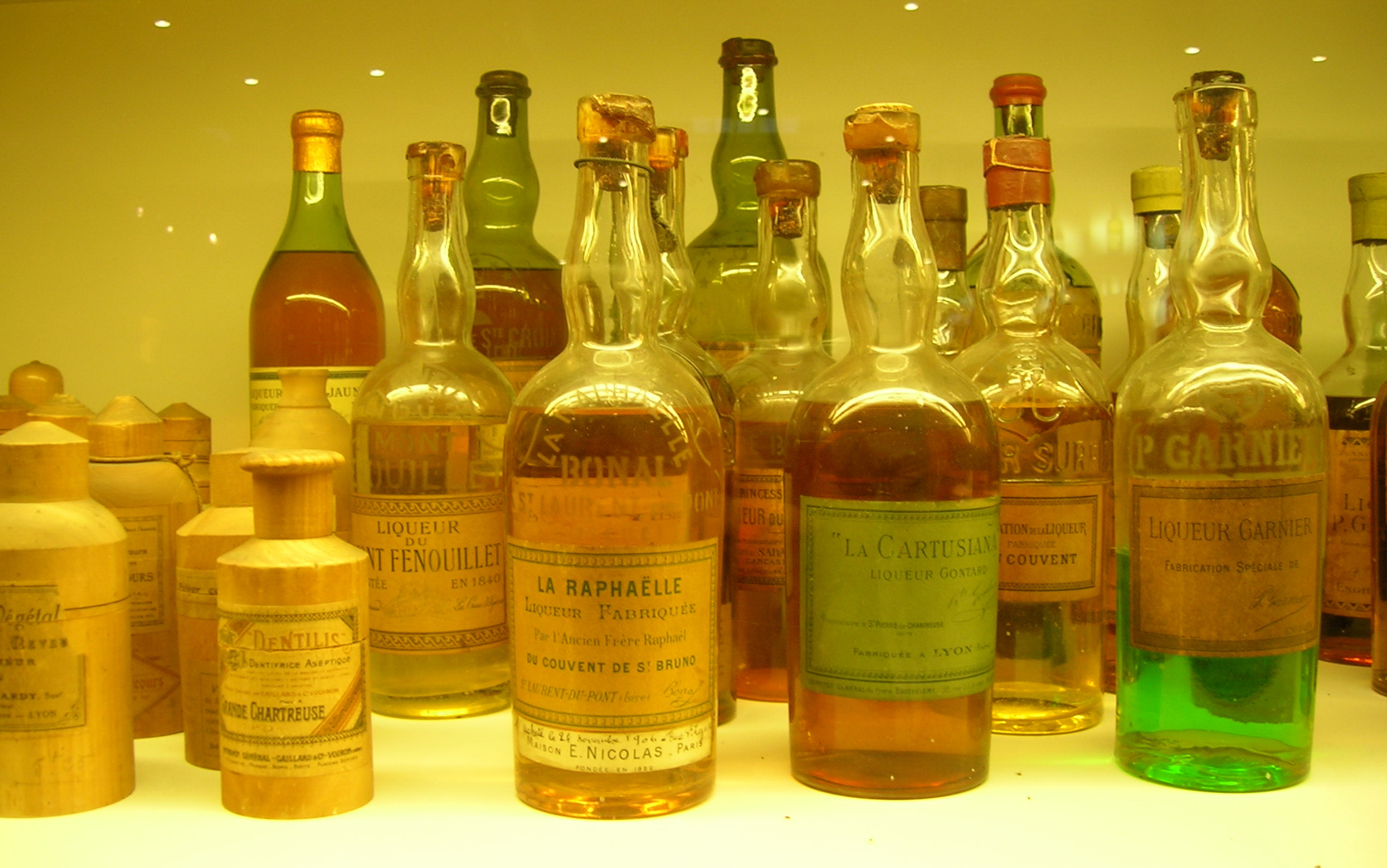
Chartreuse counterfeits

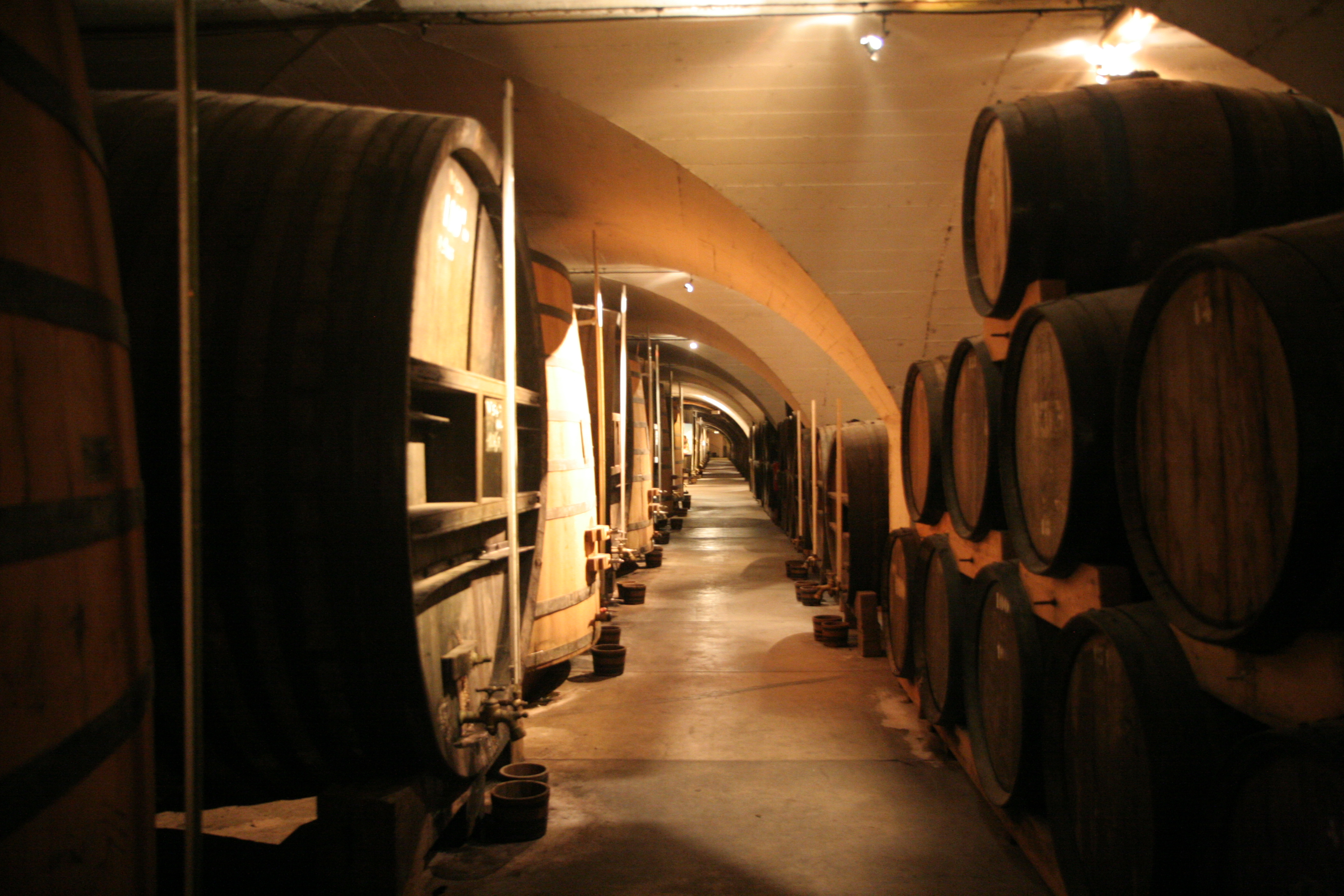
Chartreuse cellars

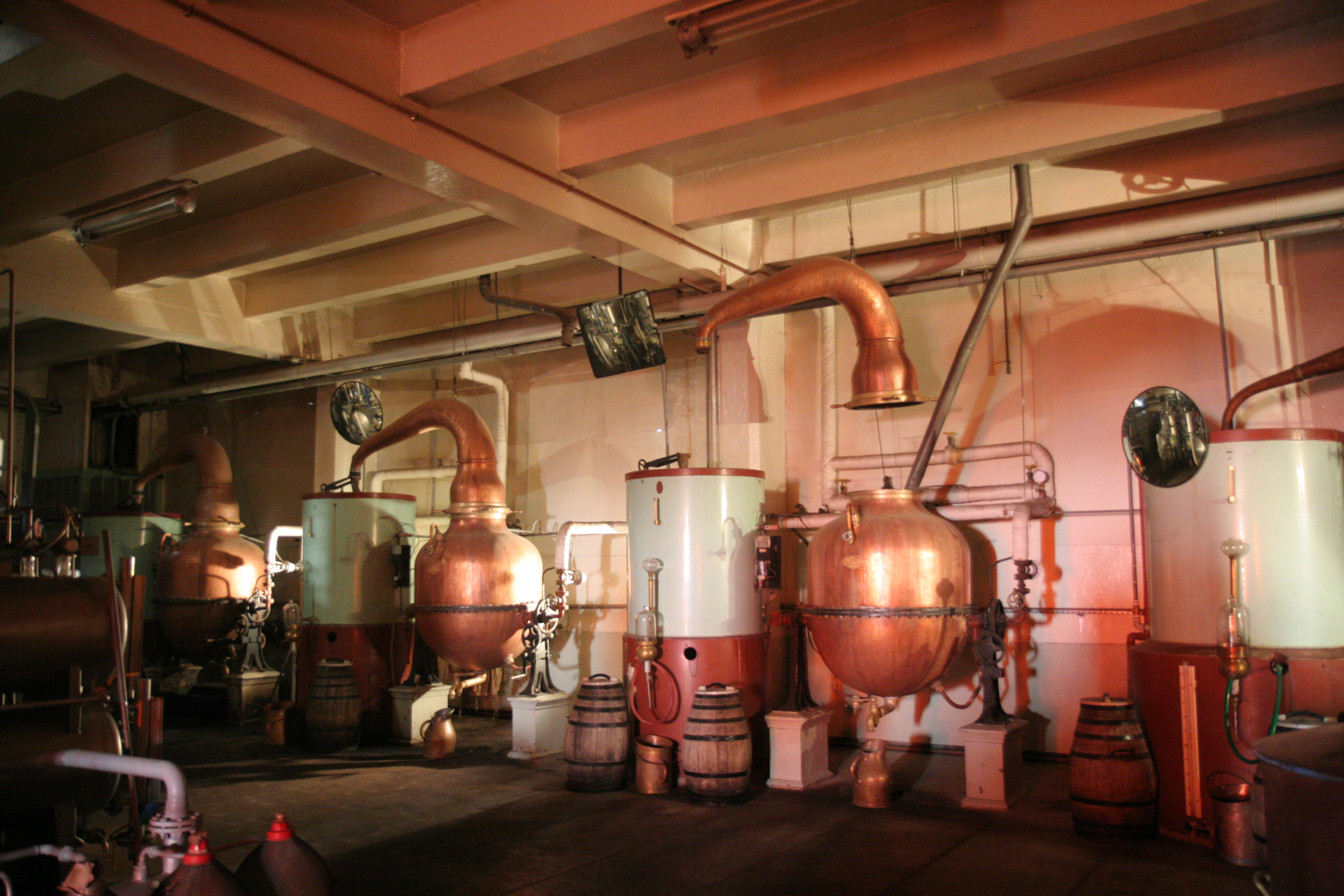
Old-style pot stills no longer in regular use, having been replaced by stainless steel stills

According to tradition, a marshal of artillery to the French king Henry IV, François Annibal d'Estrées, presented the Carthusian monks at Vauvert, near Paris, with an alchemical manuscript that contained a recipe for an "elixir of long life" in 1605. The recipe eventually reached the religious order's headquarters at the Grande Chartreuse monastery, north of Grenoble. The formula is said to include 130 herbs, plants, and flowers, plus secret ingredients, combined in an alcohol base. The recipe was further enhanced in 1737 by Brother Gérome Maubec. The word chartreuse was first recorded as the name of a colour in English in 1884, having previously referred only to the liqueur.

The beverage soon became popular, and in 1764 the monks adapted the elixir recipe to make what is now called the "Elixir Végétal de la Grande Chartreuse".

In 1793, the monks were expelled from France along with all other religious orders, and manufacture of the liqueur ceased. A copy of the manuscript was made and kept at the monastery. The original left with the monks. On the way there, the monk was arrested and sent to prison in Bordeaux. He was not searched and was able to secretly pass the manuscript to one of his friends, Dom Basile Nantas. This friend was convinced that the order would remain in Spain, never return, and that the manufacture of the liqueur would cease. He sold the manuscript to a pharmacist in Grenoble, Monsieur Liotard. In 1810, Napoleon ordered that all "secret" medical recipes be sent to the Ministry of Interior for review. The manuscript was sent and returned as "Refused" as it was not a secret but well known. After the pharmacist's death, his heirs returned the manuscript to the monks, who had been back at the monastery since 1816.

In 1840, they developed a milder version called green Chartreuse and a sweeter version called yellow Chartreuse.

The monks were again expelled from the monastery following a French law in 1903, and the government confiscated their real property, including the distillery. The monks took their secret recipe to their refuge in Tarragona, Catalonia, and began producing their liqueurs under the same label, with an additional label that read Liqueur fabriquée à Tarragone par les Pères Chartreux ("liqueur manufactured in Tarragona by the Carthusian Fathers"). At the same time, the "Compagnie Fermière de la Grande Chartreuse", a corporation in Voiron that obtained the Chartreuse assets, produced a liqueur without the monks' recipe and sold it as Chartreuse. While the French corporation was acting legally in France, the monks successfully prevented the export of the liqueur to many other countries, since the order retained ownership of its foreign trademark registrations, largely because the recipe had been kept secret. One dispute was litigated in the United States, in which the monks won a lawsuit defending their trademark in Baglin v. Cusenier.

Sales at the French company were very poor, and by 1929, it faced bankruptcy. A group of local businessmen in Voiron bought all the shares at a low price and sent them as a gift to the monks in Tarragona. After regaining possession of the distillery, the Carthusian brothers returned to the monastery with the tacit approval of the French government and resumed producing Chartreuse. Despite the eviction law, when a mudslide destroyed the distillery in 1935, the French government assigned army engineers to relocate and rebuild it near Voiron, where the monks had previously set up a distribution point. After World War II, the government lifted the expulsion order, making the Carthusian brothers legal French residents once again.

Until the 1980s, another distillery operated in Tarragona, Spain.

In 2017, the distillery moved from Voiron to nearby Aiguenoire due to safety concerns.

Today, the liqueurs are produced using the herbal mixture prepared by two monks at Grande Chartreuse. They are the only ones to know the secret recipe. Marketing, bottling, packaging, distillery management, and tours are handled by Chartreuse Diffusion, a company created in 1970. Other related alcoholic beverages are manufactured in the same distillery (e.g., Génépi).

=== 21st century: popularity and scarcity ===
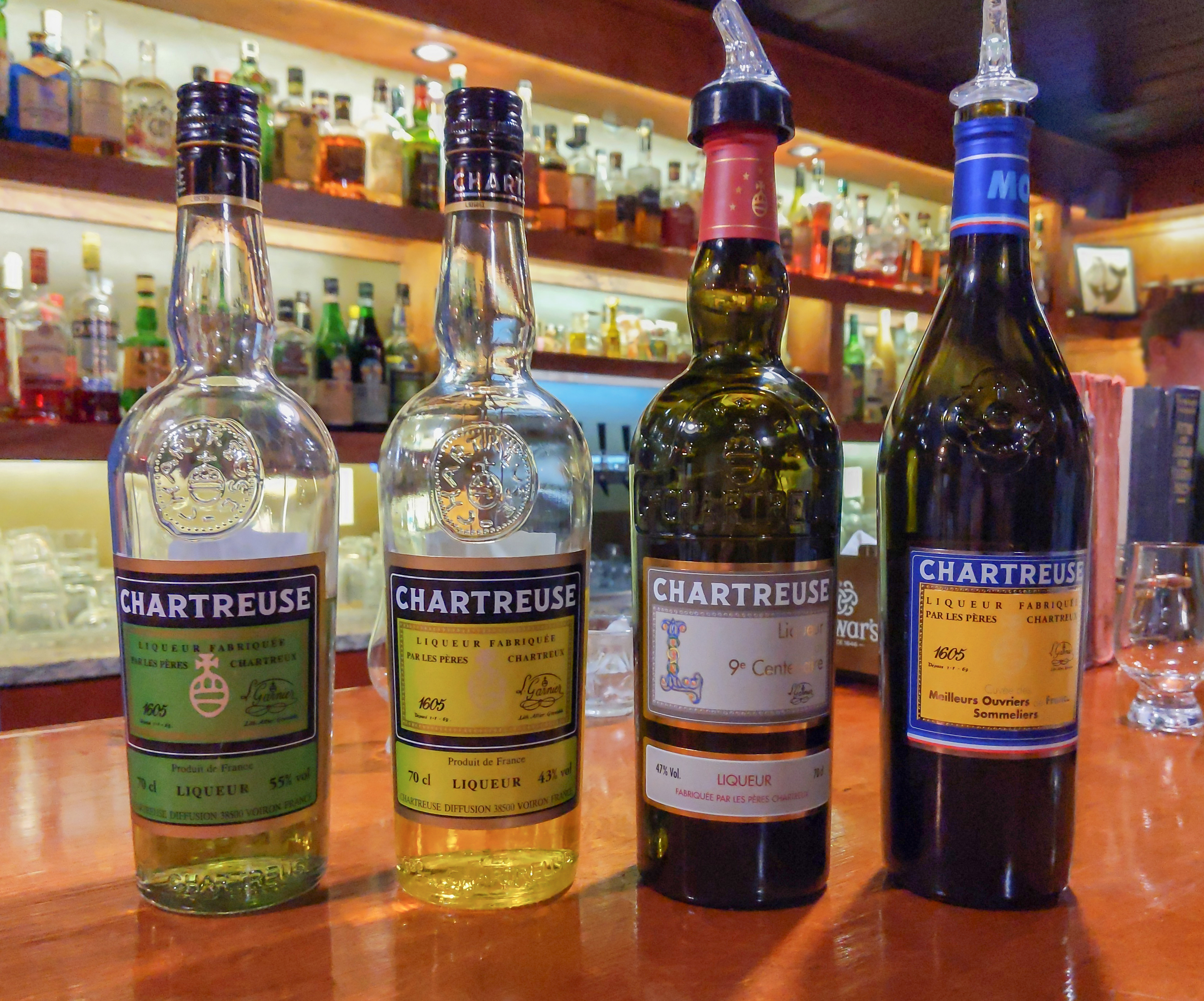
A Chartreuse tasting in the U.S., left to right: green, yellow, Liqueur du 9° Centenaire, and MOF Chartreuse products

Chartreuse increased in popularity during the craft cocktail movement of the early 2000s, due to its bittersweet profile and effective marketing of its romantic history. Cocktails such as the Last Word were popularized by mixologists. In 2020, the trend toward at-home cocktail making during the COVID-19 pandemic doubled worldwide demand for the liqueur. Global Chartreuse sales reached over US$30 million in 2022.

Meanwhile, in a separate decision, the Carthusian monks decided in 2019 to limit Chartreuse production to 1.6 million bottles per year, citing the environmental impacts of production and their desire to focus on solitude and prayer. The combination of fixed production and increased demand has resulted in shortages of Chartreuse worldwide.

== Ingredients ==
The book The Practical Hotel Steward (1900) states that green Chartreuse contains "cinnamon, mace, lemon balm, dried hyssop flower tops, peppermint, thyme, costmary, arnica flowers, genepi, and angelica roots", and that yellow Chartreuse is "similar to above, adding cardamom seeds and socctrine aloes." The monks intended their liqueur to be used as medicine. The exact recipes for all forms of Chartreuse remain trade secrets and are known at any given time only to the two monks who prepare the herbal mixture. The only formally known element of the recipe is that it uses 130 different plants.

Chartreuse is commonly used in cocktails such as Cloister, Last Word, and Chartreuse swizzle.

== Types ==
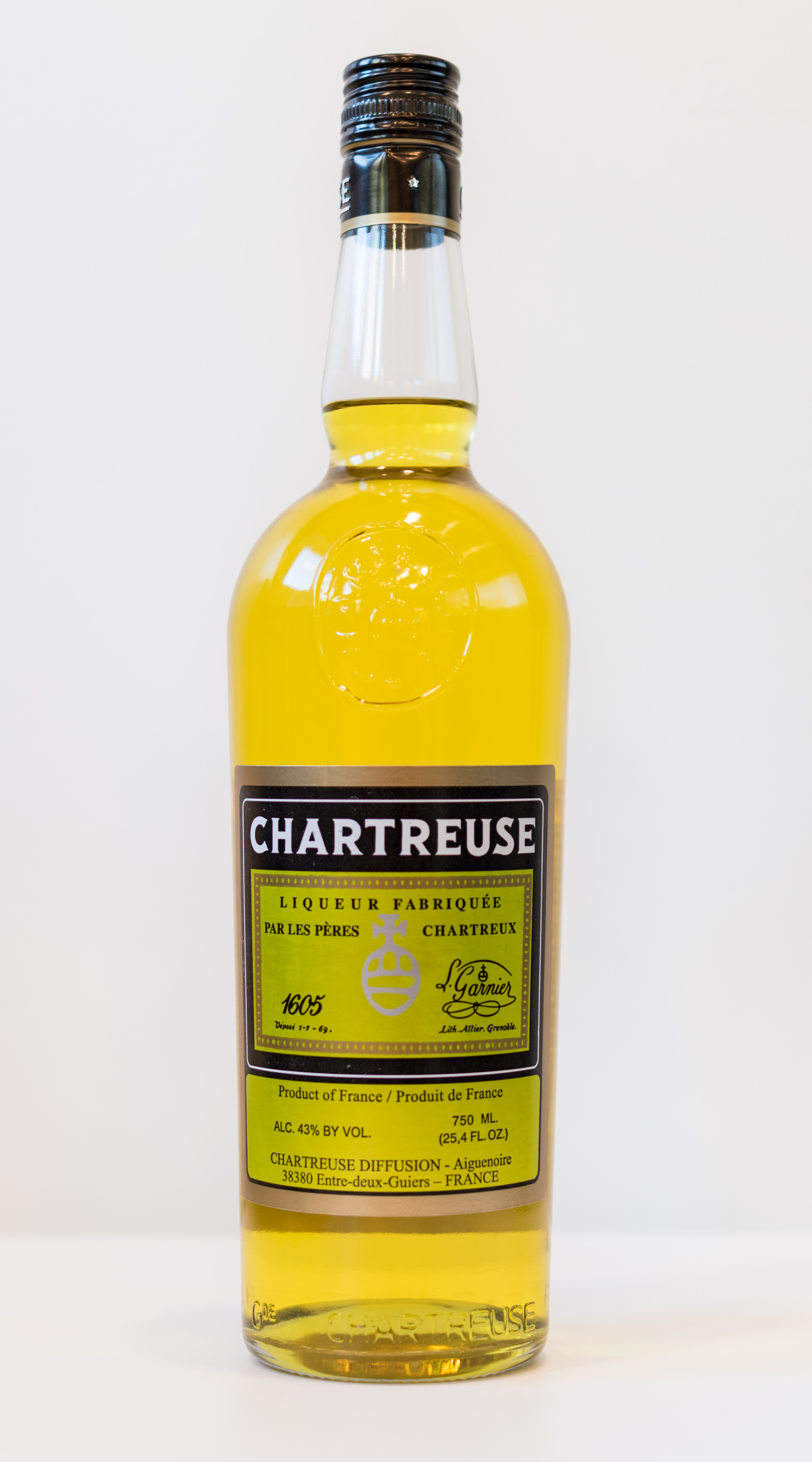
Yellow Chartreuse

=== Green Chartreuse ===
Green Chartreuse (110 proof or 55% ABV) is a naturally green liqueur made from 130 herbs and other plants macerated in alcohol and steeped for about eight hours. A final maceration of plants gives the liqueur its color. The first version of the liqueur was devised in 1825, with the modern version first released in 1840.

=== Yellow Chartreuse ===
Yellow Chartreuse (86 proof or 43%) has a milder, sweeter flavor and aroma than green Chartreuse and is lower in alcohol content.

=== Chartreuse VEP ===
VEP stands for Vieillissement Exceptionnellement Prolongé, meaning "exceptionally prolonged aging". It is made using the same processes and secret formula as the traditional liqueur, and through extra-long aging in oak casks reaches exceptional quality. Chartreuse VEP comes in both yellow and green.

=== Élixir Végétal de la Grande-Chartreuse ===
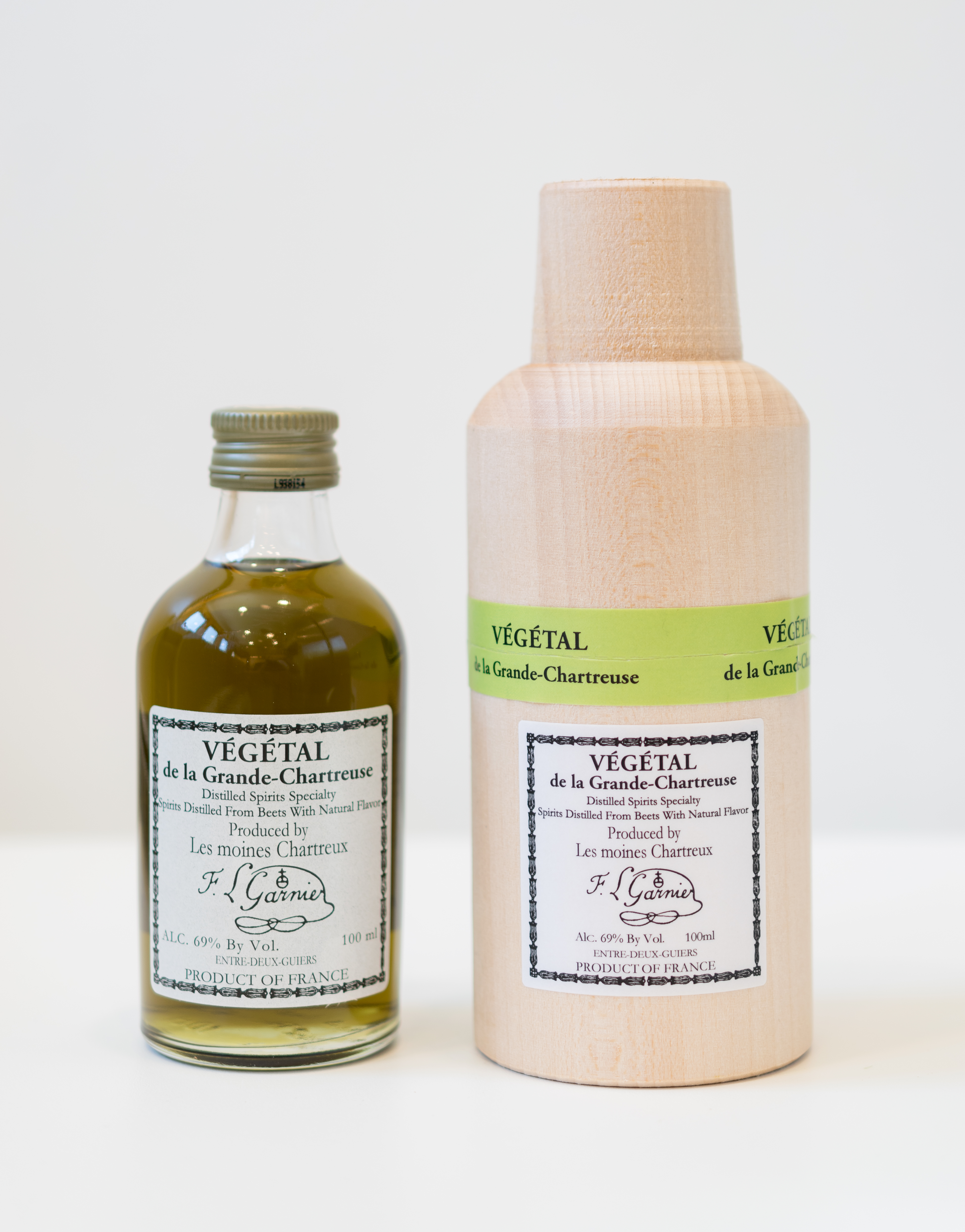
Elixir Végétal de la Grande-Chartreuse

Élixir Végétal de la Grande-Chartreuse (138 proof or 69%) has the same base of about 130 medicinal and aromatic plants and flowers but is more alcoholic. It can be described as a cordial or a liqueur, and is claimed to be a tonic. It is sold enclosed in small wooden bottles.

=== Liqueur du 9° Centenaire ===
Liqueur du 9° Centenaire (47%) was created in 1984 to commemorate the 900th anniversary of the abbey's founding. It is similar to Green Chartreuse, but slightly sweeter.

=== Chartreuse 1605 – Liqueur d'Elixir ===
Chartreuse 1605 – Liqueur d'Elixir (56%) was created to commemorate the return of a mysterious manuscript concerning an elixir of long life to the Carthusian monks, brought back by Marshal François Annibal d'Estrées.

=== White Chartreuse ===
White Chartreuse (30% ABV) was produced and sold between 1860 and 1880, and again from 1886 to 1903.

=== Génépi ===
The monks make a génépi, the general term in the Alps for a homemade or local liqueur based on Alpine Artemisia flowers. There are hundreds, or even thousands, of different génépi liqueurs, many made simply by families for their own use each year. As they have been making Chartreuse from local plants for centuries, the monks started making génépi in the 2000s as a sideline product. It is labeled "Génépi des Pères Chartreux" and is generally only available locally in a 70 cl bottle, usually labeled 40% alcohol.

=== Cuvée des Meilleurs Ouvriers de France ===
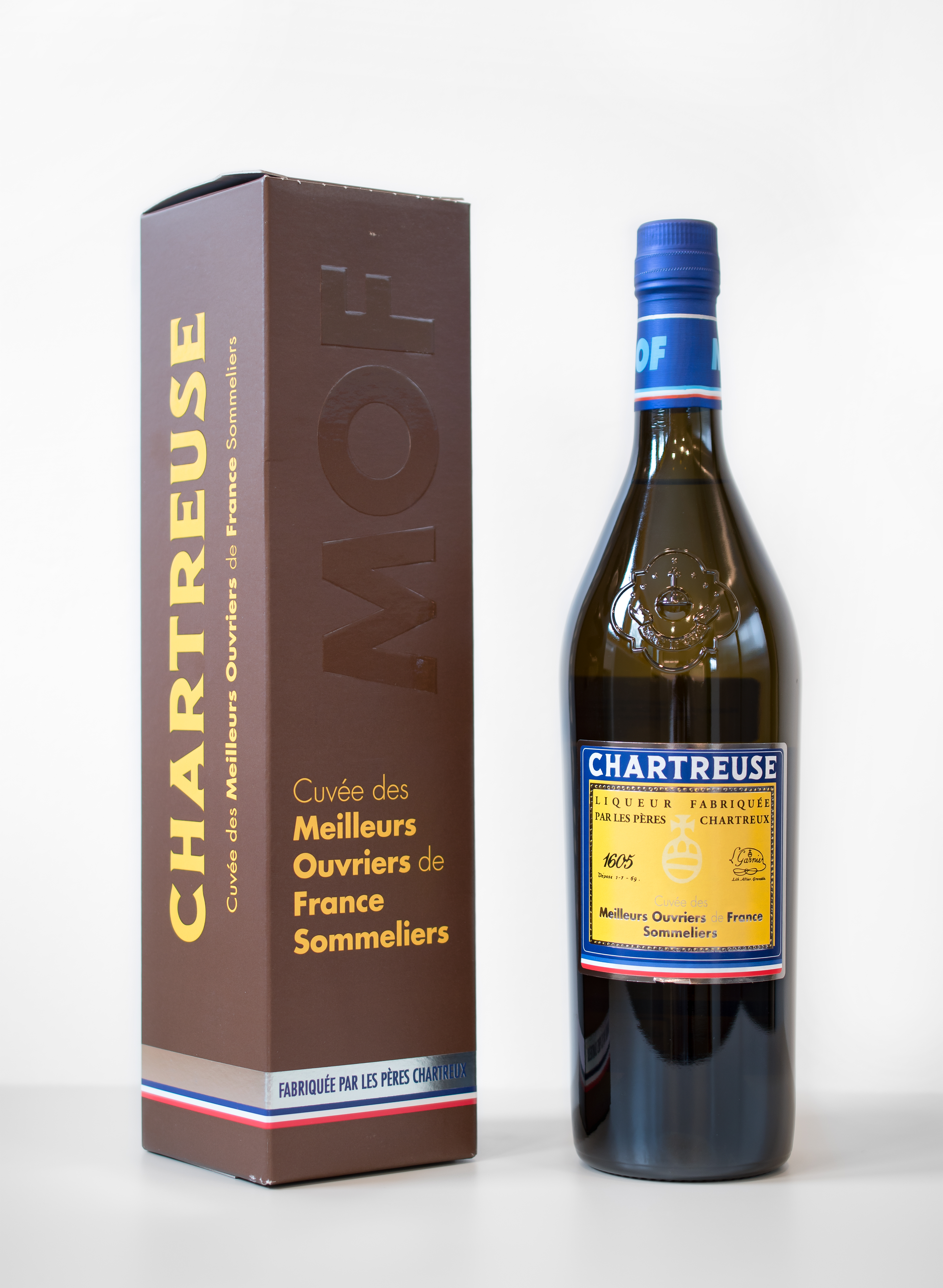
Cuvée des Meilleurs Ouvriers de France (MOF) Chartreuse

In 2007, a special edition was created by the Meilleurs Ouvriers de France (Best Craftsmen of France) in partnership with the Chartreuse distillery. It is yellow in color (45% alcohol).

== Flavor ==
Chartreuse has a very strong characteristic taste. It is very sweet but also spicy and pungent. It is comparable to other herbal liqueurs such as Galliano, Liquore Strega or Kräuterlikör, though it is distinctively more vegetal, or herbaceous. Like other liqueurs, its flavor is sensitive to serving temperature. When served straight, it can be very cold, but is often served at room temperature. It is also featured in some cocktails. Some mixed drink recipes call for only a few drops of Chartreuse due to its strong flavor. It is popular in French ski resorts where it is mixed with hot chocolate and called green chaud, translating to "hot green".

Chartreuse is one of a handful of liqueurs that continue to age and improve in the bottle.

== Accolades ==
Chartreuse liqueurs generally have performed well at international spirit ratings competitions. The basic green offering has won silver and double gold medals from the San Francisco World Spirits Competition. It has also earned an above-average score of 93 from the Beverage Testing Institute and has been given scores in the 96-100 interval by Wine Enthusiast. The VEP green and VEP yellow have generally earned similarly impressive scores. The basic yellow Chartreuse has received more modest (though still average or above) ratings.

== Influence on color ==
Chartreuse gives its name to the color chartreuse, first used as a color term in 1884. Chartreuse yellow is a color originally named "chartreuse" in 1892 after yellow Chartreuse liqueur, but since 1987 it has been called "chartreuse yellow" to avoid confusion with the green version of chartreuse.

== See also ==
- Stellina, a similar monastic liqueur made in the same region as Chartreuse
- Frangelico, a liqueur allegedly based on a monastic recipe
- Bénédictine, another liqueur allegedly based on a monastic recipe
- Centerbe, an Italian liqueur of pale green color made from mountain herbs
- Chartreuse swizzle, a cocktail using Chartreuse as its base spirit
