= Santa Monica Fire Department =

Fire department in Santa Monica, California, U.S.

Santa Monica Fire Department (SMFD)
Operational area
- Country: United States
- State: California
- City: Santa Monica

Agency overview
- Established: 1889
- Annual calls: 16,000
- Fire chief: Matthew Hallock
- IAFF: 1109

Facilities and equipment
- Stations: 5

Website
- Official Website

The Santa Monica Fire Department was established in 1889. The department has five fire stations across the city and responds to over 16,000 calls annually.

The Santa Monica Fire Department (SMFD) provides fire protection and emergency medical services for the city of Santa Monica, Spanish for "Saint Monica," a beachfront city situated on Santa Monica Bay, and located in western Los Angeles County. Incorporated as a city on November 30, 1886, Santa Monica has a nighttime population of approximately 96,456, while its daytime population exceeds 250,000. The city encompasses an area covering 8.3 square miles (21 km^{2}), including the neighborhoods of Ocean Park, Sunset Park (with general aviation Santa Monica Airport), Downtown Santa Monica, Northeast Neighbors, Ocean Avenue (with the Santa Monica Pier), Mar Vista, Midtown Santa Monica, the Pico District, and Montana Avenue. The city is bordered on five sides by different neighborhoods of the city of Los Angeles: Pacific Palisades to the north, Brentwood on the northeast, West Los Angeles on the east, Mar Vista on the southeast, and Venice on the south.

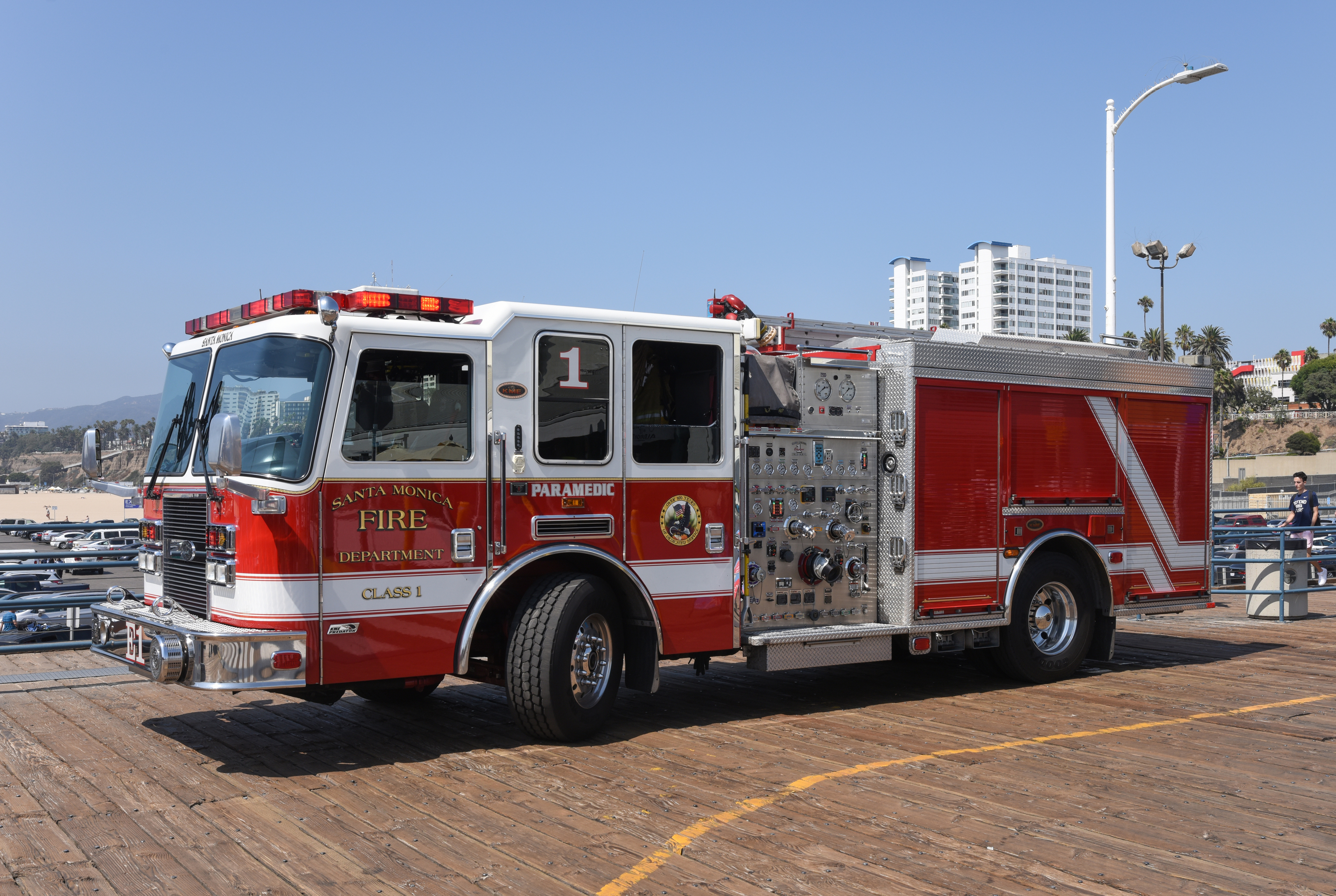
Santa Monica Fire Truck

The Santa Monica Fire Department has mutual aid agreements with the Los Angeles Fire Department, the Culver City Fire Department, and the Beverly Hills Fire Department.

== History ==
In October 1875, six residents of Santa Monica came together to establish the Crawford Hook and Ladder Company, marking the beginning of organized firefighting in the area. As the town grew, the frequency of fires increased, leading to greater demands on the Fire Department. On March 22, 1889, citizens gathered at the town hall to formalize the constitution of the newly created Santa Monica Hose and Ladder Company, officially founding what is now known as the Santa Monica Fire Department (SMFD). Over time, the SMFD has evolved and reached numerous milestones, including earning and maintaining an ISO Class 1 rating since 2012. This achievement places them among only five Class 1 agencies within Los Angeles County.

Matthew Hallock was appointed as Fire Chief in 2024. Fire station #5 was the host of President Biden's press conference following the outbreak of the Palisades Fire.

== Stations ==
Fire Station	Address	Engine	Truck	Other	Ref.
1	1444 7th St.	Engine 1 & Engine 6	Truck 1	AirLight 1 & Battalion 1	
2	222 Hollister Ave.	Engine 2 & Reserve		USAR 2	
3	1302 19 St.	Engine 3, Engine 4 & Reserve		HazMat 4 & Utility 4	
5	2450 Ashland Ave.	Engine 5 & Reserve	Reserve Truck	Crash Rescue 5	
7	1100 Pacific Coast Highway	Engine 7		Beach Medical Vehicle 7	

=== Fire Station 1 ===
Fire Station 1 is the flagship station of the Santa Monica Fire Department and houses the Battalion Chief. The station is 28,000 square feet (2,600 m^{2}), has 20 co-ed dormitories and is LEED Certified.

The station has a public art installation by Deborah Aschhein called "Back Story". The installation is made of painted and fired art glass panes with watercolor images of daily firefighting life. The installation was created through the city of Santa Monica's Percent for Art program.
