= Stellina (liqueur) =

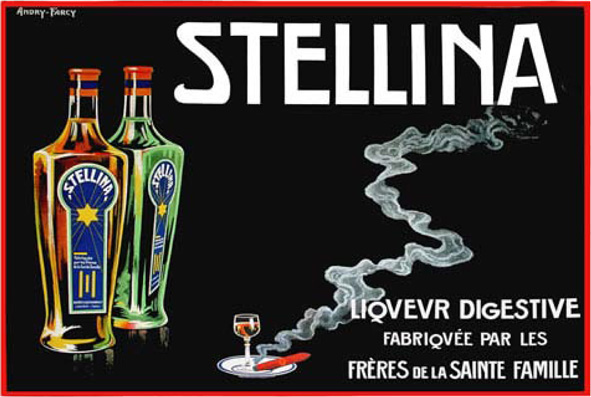
Advertising for Stellina drinks in 1950

Stellina is a herbal liqueur made by the monastic order of the Sainte Famille (Holy Family) in Belley, France. It is considered similar to Chartreuse, both being made by monks in the same region, to secret recipes, and also coming in both green and yellow. However, Stellina is much younger (dating to 1904, rather than 1605), smaller (the Sainte Famille order has 300 members), and much less-known than Chartreuse.
