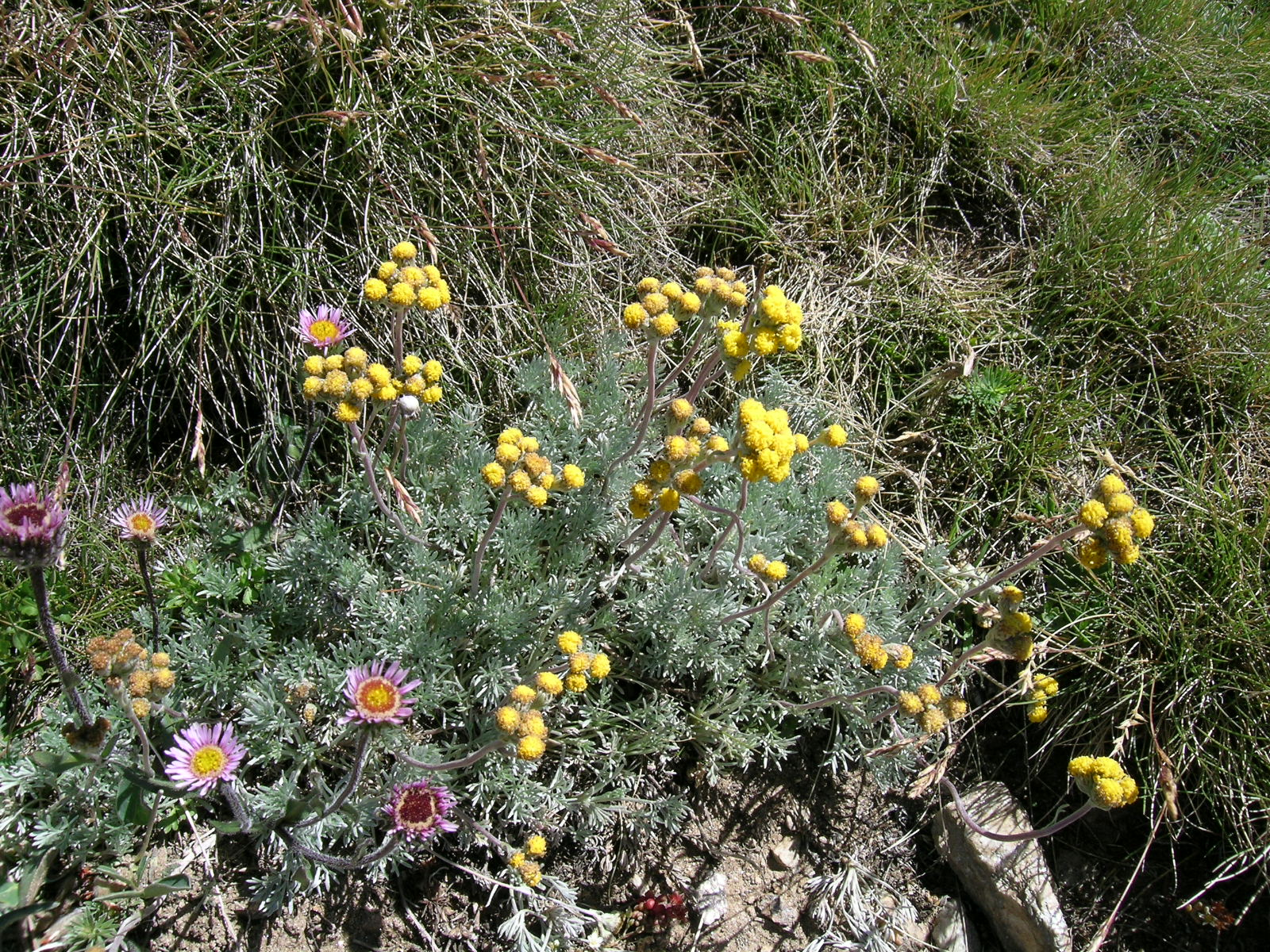

Scientific classification
- Kingdom: Plantae
- Clade: Tracheophytes
- Clade: Angiosperms
- Clade: Eudicots
- Clade: Asterids
- Order: Asterales
- Family: Asteraceae
- Genus: Artemisia
- Species: A. glacialis

Binomial name
- Artemisia glacialis L. (Note: Artemisia glacialis L. (1763) not Vitman (1773) nor Bourg. ex Willk. & Lange (1865))

Synonyms
- Absinthium congestum (Lam.) Absinthium glaciale (Lam.) Artemisia elegans (Jan ex Besser) Artemisia glacialis var. intermedia (Gaudin)

= Artemisia glacialis =

Species of flowering plant

Artemisia glacialis, the glacier wormwood, is a species of flowering plant in the aster family.

Artemisia glacialis grows to approximately 18 cm (7.1 in) high, and is indigenous to the Alpine regions of France, Italy, and Switzerland.

== Uses ==
Artemisia glacialis is historically employed in liqueurs, as well as a digestive and stomachic preparations. The poultice is used for the treatment of wounds.

== Hazards ==
Artemisia glacialis might cause dermatitis or other allergic reactions.
