= NFPA 1901 =

- Standard for Automotive Fire Apparatus
- Abbreviation: NFPA 1901
- Status: Retired
- First published: 1975
- Latest version: 2016
- Organization: National Fire Protection Association
- Committee: Fire Department Apparatus
- Related standards: NFPA 414, NFPA 1906, NFPA 1917
- Predecessor: NFPA 19
- Successor: NFPA 1900
- Domain: Fire apparatus design
- Website: www.nfpa.org/codes-and-standards/nfpa-1901-standard-development/1901

NFPA 1901, the Standard for Automotive Fire Apparatus, is published by the National Fire Protection Association to outline the standard for firefighting apparatus. The listing sets minimum standards for mechanical, cosmetic, lighting, and all equipment to be included with fire apparatus to be standards compliant in the United States. The final edition of NFPA 1901 was the 2016 Edition. In 2020, the National Fire Protection Association started a consolidation of standards, which included combining NFPA 1901 into a new standard NFPA 1900, that encompassed aviation and motor vehicles for firefighting purposes and motor vehicle ambulances.

As described by National Fire Protection Association: "NFPA 1901 defines the requirements for new automotive fire apparatus designed to be used under emergency conditions for transporting personnel and equipment, and to support the suppression of fires and mitigation of other hazardous situations. This Standard covers everything from pumpers to aerial fire apparatus to special service apparatus, such as rescue vehicles and haz-mat vehicles, as well as quints and mobile foam apparatus."

== History ==
Early guidance on fire apparatus design dates back to 1906, when NFPA adopted a report from the NFPA Committee on Fire Engines, which laid early foundations for design and testing of pumps on fire apparatus. The predecessor standard, NFPA 19, was first published in 1914, and would go under numerous revisions through the 1960s, as the standard was expanded to encompass more firefighting vehicles, such as ladder trucks and fire trucks servicing rural locales.

In the 1975, NFPA 19 renumbered to NFPA 1901 and titled, Standard on Automotive Fire Apparatus, as part of a broader review of the numbers and names of standards. The 1991 Edition saw a significant changes to firefighting vehicles: requiring the driving and cab area be completely enclosed, firefighters be seated and wearing a seat belt and prohibited riding on the side or rear platforms of a fire truck. Further safety improvements included mandatory access handrails, and reflective striping on all fire apparatus.

In 2009, the new edition of NFPA 1901 tightened the specifications for retroreflective markings on the rear of firefighting vehicles, specifying the usage of a upward pointing chevron pattern covering at least 50% of the rear of the vehicle. The colors were also required to be red and either yellow, fluorescent-yellow, green-yellow. The requirement for specific colors was met with pushback during discussion of the change as individual departments had opinions and traditions relating to colors being used on a vehicle and disliked the idea of being required to use specific colors. However, the technical committee concluded that a consistent design and color scheme was beneficial as drivers encountering a firefighting vehicle would encounter the same pattern anywhere and be able to recognize it, similar to the standardization of traffic signs. Standardizing the design and color was supported by International Association of Fire Chiefs and the Emergency Responder Safety Institute.

In 2020, as part of a broader effort to consolidate standards, NFPA 1901 was merged with NFPA 414, NFPA 1906 and NFPA 1971 (Note: Standard for Aircraft Rescue and Fire-Fighting Vehicles, Standard for Wildland Fire Apparatus, Standard for Automotive Ambulances) to form NFPA 1900, Standard for Aircraft Rescue and Firefighting Vehicles, Automotive Fire Apparatus, Wildland Fire Apparatus, and Automotive Ambulances.

== Standard ==
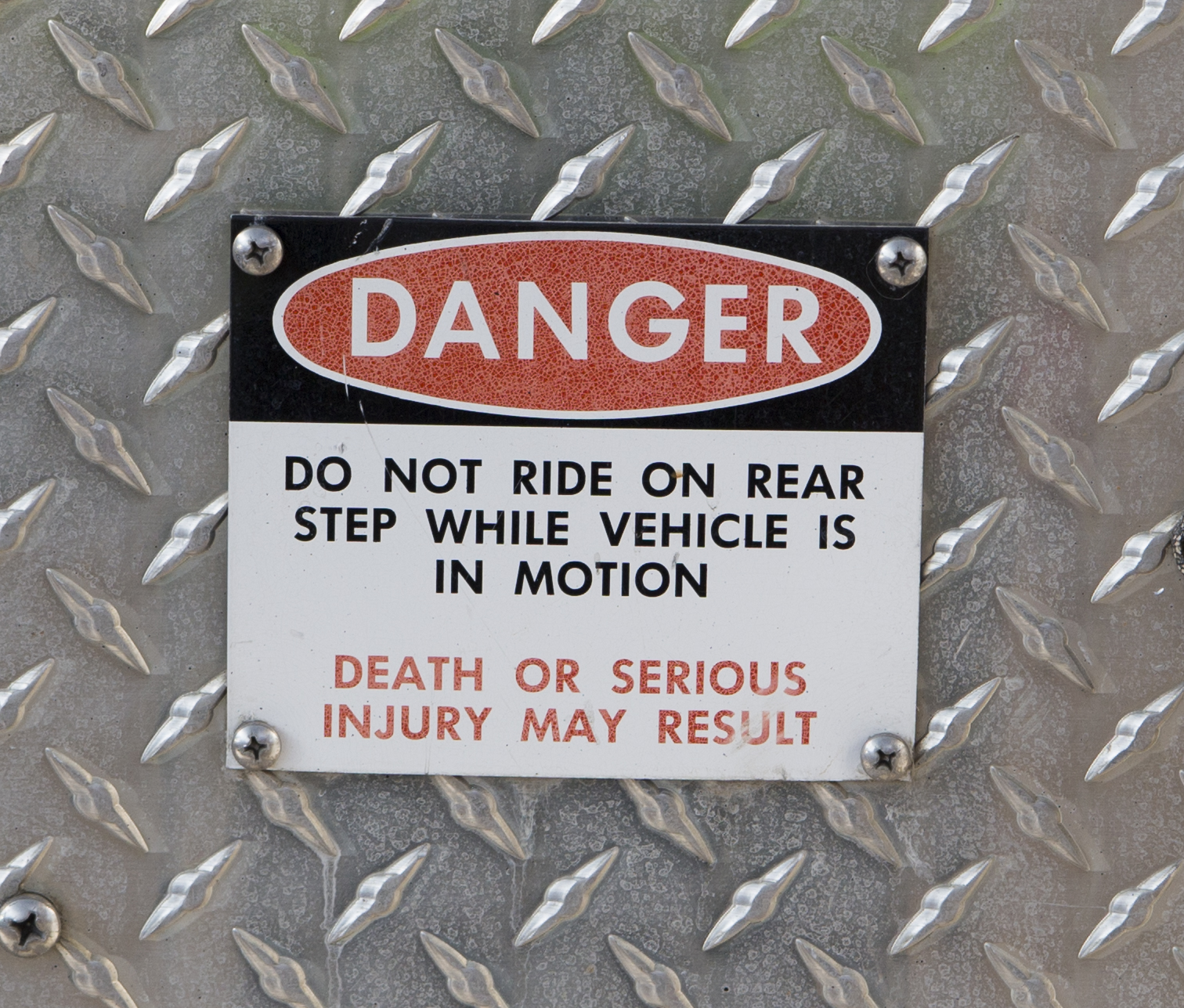
A safety sign prohibiting riding on the rear step of a fire truck

=== Editions ===
New editions of NFPA 1901 were published in the following years.

- 1975
- 1979
- 1985
- 1991
- 1996
- 1999
- 2003
- 2009
- 2016

=== Chapters in 2016 Edition ===
These are the Chapters in 2016 Edition of NFPA 1901, the final edition published.

- Chapter 1 - Administration
- Chapter 2 - Referenced Publications
- Chapter 3 - Definitions
- Chapter 4 - General Requirements
- Chapter 5 - Pumper Fire Apparatus
- Chapter 6 - Initial Attack Fire Apparatus
- Chapter 7 - Mobile Water Supply Fire Apparatus
- Chapter 8 - Aerial Fire Apparatus
- Chapter 9 - Quint Fire Apparatus
- Chapter 10 - Special Service Fire Apparatus
- Chapter 11 - Mobile Foam Fire Apparatus
- Chapter 12 - Chassis and Vehicle Components
- Chapter 13 - Low Voltage Electrical Systems and Warning Devices
- Chapter 14 - Driving and Crew Areas
- Chapter 15 - Body, Compartments, and Equipment Mounting
- Chapter 16 - Fire Pumps and Associated Equipment
- Chapter 17 - Auxiliary Pumps and Associated Equipment
- Chapter 18 - Water Tanks
- Chapter 19 - Aerial Devices
- Chapter 20 - Foam Proportioning Systems
- Chapter 21 - Compressed Air Foam Systems (CAFS)
- Chapter 22 - Line Voltage Electrical Systems
- Chapter 23 - Command and Communications
- Chapter 24 - Air Systems
- Chapter 25 - Winches
- Chapter 26 - Trailers
- Chapter 27 - Reserved
- Chapter 28 - Ultra-High Pressure Fire Pumps and Associated Equipment

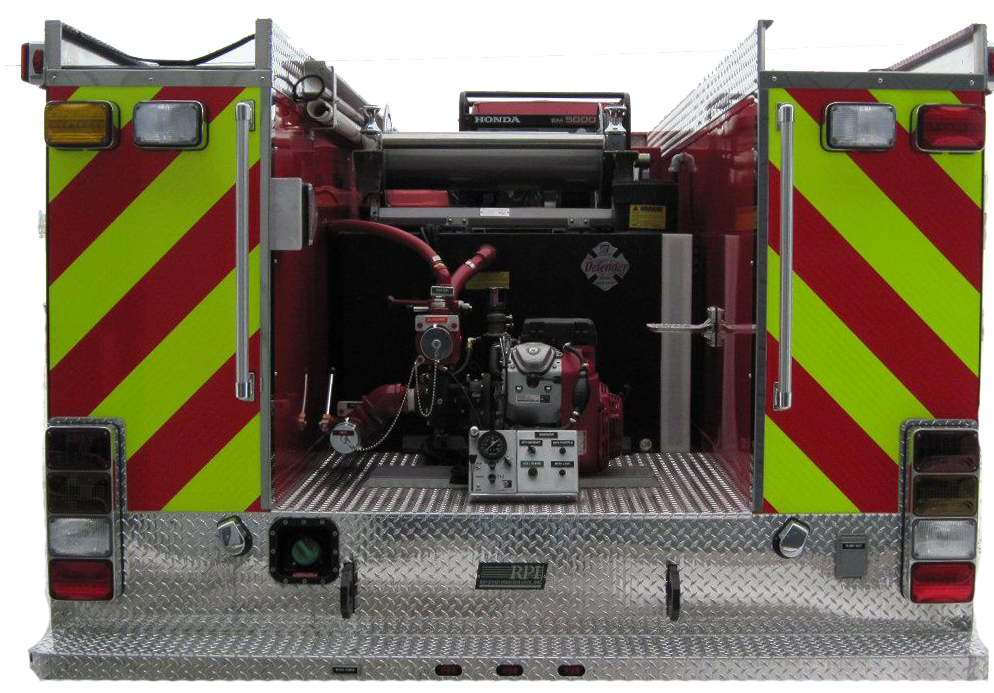
NFPA 1901, Edition 2009 compliant reflective chevron markings on fire/rescue truck

== Bibliography ==
- "NFPA 1901 - Standard for Automotive Fire Apparatus - 1975 Edition". nfpa.org. National Fire Protection Association. 1975.
- "NFPA 1901 - Standard for Automotive Fire Apparatus - 1991 Edition". nfpa.org. National Fire Protection Association. 1991.
- "NFPA 1901 - Standard for Automotive Fire Apparatus - 2016 Edition". nfpa.org. National Fire Protection Association. 2016.
- "NFPA 1900 - Standard for Aircraft Rescue and Firefighting Vehicles, Automotive Fire Apparatus, Wildland Fire Apparatus, and Automotive Ambulances (2024) - 2024 Edition". nfpa.org. National Fire Protection Association. 2016.
- US Fire Administration (August 2009). "Emergency Vehicle Visibility and Conspicuity Study - FA-323" (PDF). usfa.fema.gov. Federal Emergency Management Agency. Archived from the original (PDF) on 25 July 2024.
