= Sagebrush =

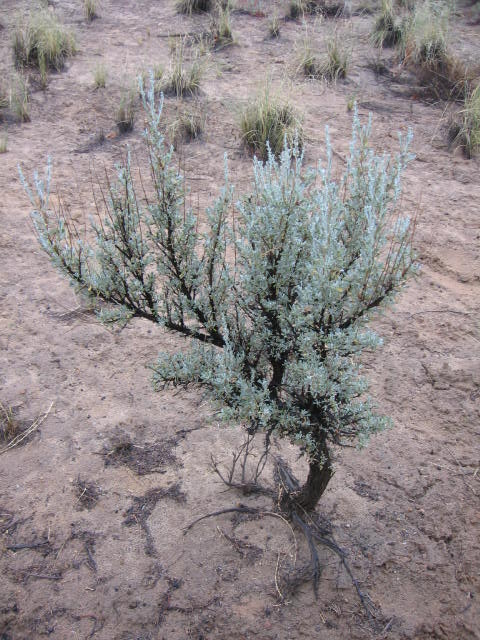
Artemisia tridentata ("big sagebrush")

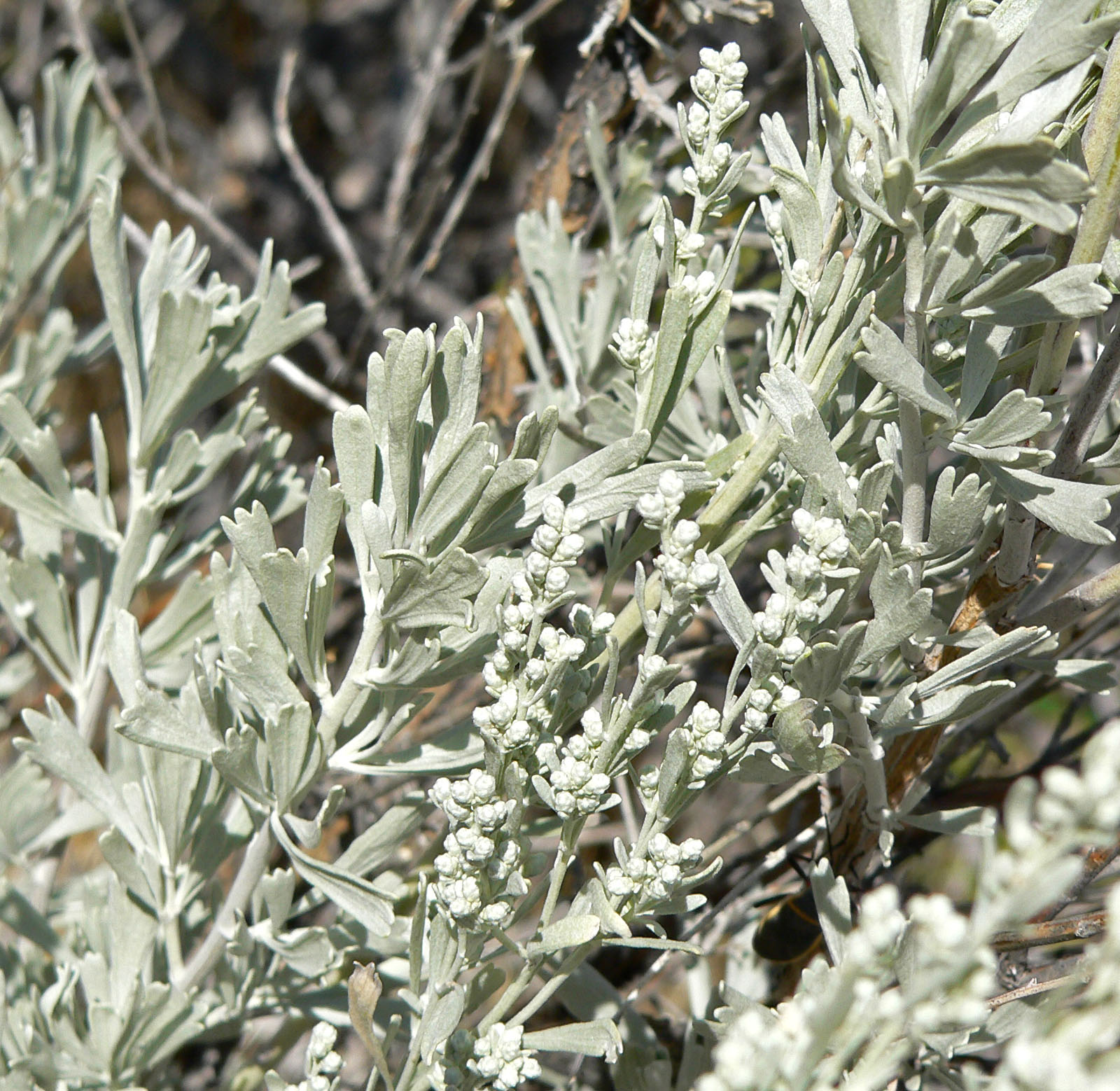
Leaves and flowers of Artemisia tridentata

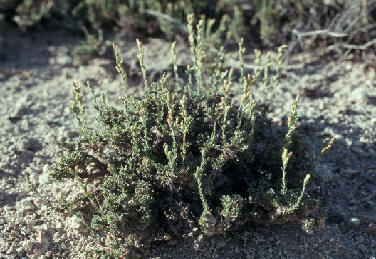
Artemisia pygmaea

Sagebrush is the common name of several woody and herbaceous species of plants in the genus Artemisia. The best-known sagebrush is the shrub Artemisia tridentata. Sagebrush is native to the western half of North America.

Following is an alphabetical list of common names for various species of the genus Artemisia, along with their corresponding scientific names. Many of these species are known by more than one common name, and some common names represent more than one species.

- Alpine sagebrush—Artemisia scopulorum
- African sagebrush—Artemisia afra
- Basin sagebrush—Artemisia tridentata
- Big sagebrush—see Basin sagebrush
- Bigelow sagebrush—Artemisia bigelovii
- Birdfoot sagebrush—Artemisia pedatifida
- Black sagebrush—Artemisia nova
- Blue sagebrush—see Basin sagebrush
- Boreal sagebrush—Artemisia norvegica
- Budsage—Artemisia spinescens
- California sagebrush—Artemisia californica
- Carruth's sagebrush—Artemisia carruthii
- Coastal sagebrush—see California sagebrush
- Dwarf sagebrush—see Alpine sagebrush
- Fringed sagebrush—Artemisia frigida
- Gray sagewort—see White sagebrush
- Island sagebrush—Artemisia nesiotica
- Little sagebrush—Artemisia arbuscula
- Longleaf sagebrush—Artemisia longifolia
- Low sagebrush—see Little sagebrush
- Michaux sagebrush—Artemisia michauxiana
- Owyhee sagebrush—Artemisia papposa
- Prairie sagebrush—see White sagebrush
- Pygmy sagebrush—Artemisia pygmaea
- Ragweed sagebrush—Artemisia franserioides
- Sand sagebrush—Artemisia filifolia
- Scabland sagebrush—Artemisia rigida
- Silver sagebrush—Artemisia cana
- Succor Creek sagebrush—Artemisia packardiae
- Timberline sagebrush—Artemisia rothrockii
- Threetip sagebrush—Artemisia tripartita
- White sagebrush—Artemisia ludoviciana

== See also ==
- Sagebrush scrub
- Sagebrush steppe
