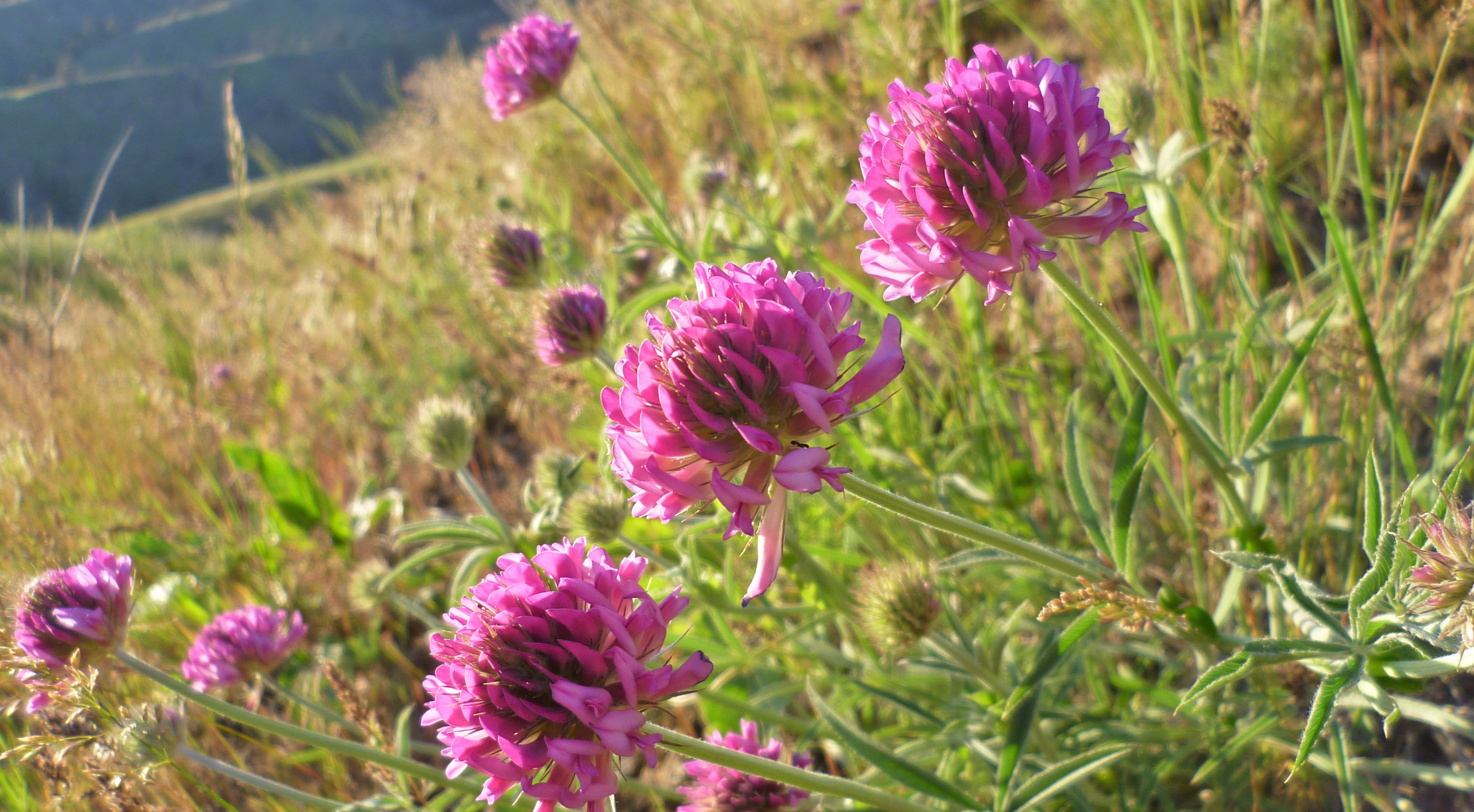

Conservation status
- Imperiled (NatureServe)

Scientific classification
- Kingdom: Plantae
- Clade: Embryophytes
- Clade: Tracheophytes
- Clade: Angiosperms
- Clade: Eudicots
- Clade: Rosids
- Order: Fabales
- Family: Fabaceae
- Subfamily: Faboideae
- Genus: Trifolium
- Species: T. thompsonii

Binomial name
- Trifolium thompsonii Morton

= Trifolium thompsonii =

Species of legume

Trifolium thompsonii is a species of flowering plant in the legume family known by the common name Thompson's clover.

== Description ==
This is a large clover with a thick stem growing up to 60 centimeters (24 in) tall. The leaves are divided into three to eight serrated leaflets. The inflorescence is a round head of several bright red-lavender flowers. Blooming occurs in May through July.

== Distribution and habitat ==
The species is endemic to Washington state in the United States, where it occurs in two counties. One of the largest populations occurs in the Entiat Slopes Natural Area Preserve in Chelan County.

It grows in several types of habitat. One study identified four plant associations that include the clover. The Pseudotsuga menziesii/Calamagrostis rubescens forest habitat is a cooler, moister area with associated species such as Spiraea betulifolia, Penstemon fruticosus, Balsamorhiza sagittata, and Achillea millefolium. The Artemisia vaseyana/Agropyron spicatum association includes Artemisia tripartita, Poa secunda, and Festuca idahoensis. A third association, the Pinus ponderosa/Agropyron spicatum has sparse tree cover, a grass understory, and no tall shrubs. Associated species include Eriogonum heracleoides, Phlox longifolia, Haplopappus stenophyllus, and Antennaria rosea. The Artemisia tridentata/Agropyron spicatum association is a drier habitat which includes many forbs such as Allium acuminatum, Agoseris grandiflora, Lomatium nudicaule, and Lupinus sericeus.

A Research Natural Area, the Thompson Clover Research Natural Area, was established in 1977 in the Wenatchee National Forest for the study and protection of this species.

== Ecology ==
Pollinators include bumblebees and the Greenish Blue, a butterfly.
