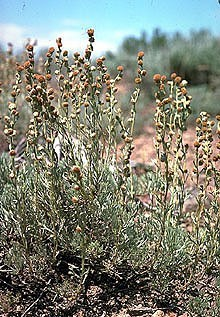

Conservation status
- Apparently Secure (NatureServe)

Scientific classification
- Kingdom: Plantae
- Clade: Embryophytes
- Clade: Tracheophytes
- Clade: Angiosperms
- Clade: Eudicots
- Clade: Asterids
- Order: Asterales
- Family: Asteraceae
- Genus: Artemisia
- Species: A. papposa

Binomial name
- Artemisia papposa S.F.Blake & Cronquist

= Artemisia papposa =

Species of flowering plant

Artemisia papposa is a species of flowering plant in the aster family known by the common names Owyhee sage, Owyhee sagebrush, and fuzzy sagebrush. It is native to the Snake River Plain and surrounding areas in the northwestern United States, occurring in southern Idaho, eastern Oregon, and northern Nevada.

This small aromatic shrub grows up to 15 or 20 centimeters tall with several grayish stems. The small gray-green leaves are usually lobed. The inflorescence is an array of several flower heads containing yellow ray and disc florets. The fruit is an achene. Unlike those of most other Artemisia, the achenes of this species are topped with pappi.

Artemisia papposa grows on sagebrush steppe, and in meadows, alkali flats, and sagebrush-juniper associations. It grows alongside plants such as thymeleaf and mat buckwheats (Eriogonum thymoides and E. caespitosum, respectively), lava aster (Ionactis alpina), whip pussytoes (Antennaria flagellaris), onespike danthonia (Danthonia unispicata), western needlegrass (Achnatherum occidentale ssp. occidentale), barestem biscuitroot (Lomatium nudicaule), and Sandberg bluegrass (Poa secunda). It occurs in mid-elevation habitat, often in shallow, rocky, poorly drained soils.
