= Aroga rigidae =

Scientific classification
- Domain: Eukaryota
- Kingdom: Animalia
- Phylum: Arthropoda
- Class: Insecta
- Order: Lepidoptera
- Family: Gelechiidae
- Genus: Aroga
- Species: A. rigidae

Binomial name
- Aroga rigidae (Clarke, 1935)

Synonyms
- Gelechia rigidae Clarke, 1935

Species of moth

Aroga rigidae is a moth of the family Gelechiidae. It is found in North America, where it has been recorded from Washington.

The larvae feed on Artemisia rigida.
