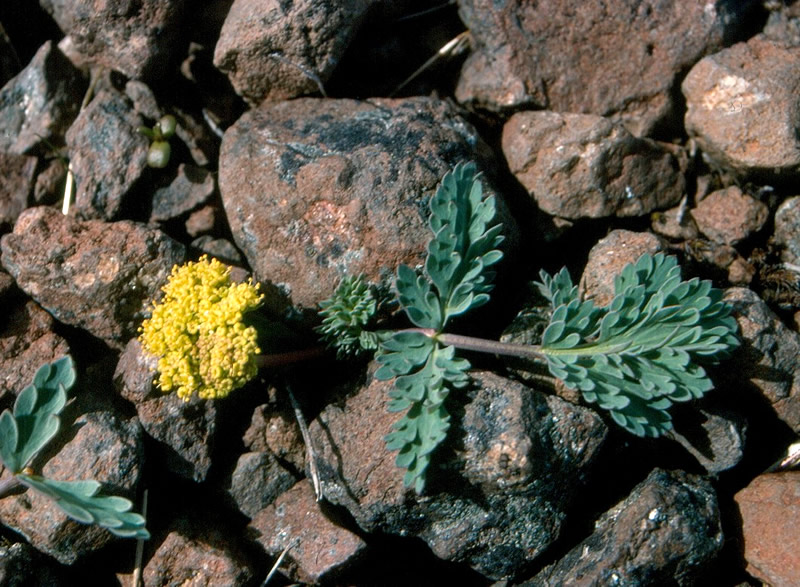

Scientific classification
- Kingdom: Plantae
- Clade: Tracheophytes
- Clade: Angiosperms
- Clade: Eudicots
- Clade: Asterids
- Order: Apiales
- Family: Apiaceae
- Subfamily: Apioideae
- Tribe: Selineae
- Genus: Lomatium
- Species: L. ochocense

Binomial name
- Lomatium ochocense Helliwell & Constance

= Lomatium ochocense =

Species of flowering plant

Lomatium ochocense is a rare species of flowering plant in the carrot family known by the common name Ochoco lomatium. It is endemic to Oregon, where it is limited to the Ochoco Mountains of Crook County.

This plant was discovered in 1994 and described to science as a new species in 2010. It is a small perennial herb growing up to 8 centimeters tall. It grows from a large black root up to 3 centimeters in diameter. The waxy blue-green leaves are divided into many overlapping segments. The inflorescence is a compound umbel of flowers that extends out horizontally. The flowers are andromonoecious, either bisexual or only staminate with no female parts. It has tiny yellow petals and grows among many other species of Lomatium. It can be distinguished by its blue-green leaves with overlapping leaflets.

This plant is restricted to scabland habitat with exposed bedrock. Other plants in the area include scabland sagebrush (Artemisia rigida), pine bluegrass (Poa secunda), rock onion (Allium macrum), bitterroot (Lewisia rediviva), Henderson's needlegrass (Achnatherum hendersonii), and wormleaf stonecrop (Sedum stenopetalum). Lomatium species are common.

Though the plant is a local endemic, the populations are quite large and are located on Bureau of Land Management land with few threats to their survival.
