= Aroga kurdistana =

Scientific classification
- Domain: Eukaryota
- Kingdom: Animalia
- Phylum: Arthropoda
- Class: Insecta
- Order: Lepidoptera
- Family: Gelechiidae
- Genus: Aroga
- Species: A. kurdistana

Binomial name
- Aroga kurdistana Derra, 2011

Species of moth

Aroga kurdistana is a moth of the family Gelechiidae. It is found in Turkey.
