= Aroga morenella =

Scientific classification
- Kingdom: Animalia
- Phylum: Arthropoda
- Clade: Pancrustacea
- Class: Insecta
- Order: Lepidoptera
- Family: Gelechiidae
- Genus: Aroga
- Species: A. morenella

Binomial name
- Aroga morenella (Busck, 1908)

Synonyms
- Gelechia morenella Busck, 1908

Species of moth

Aroga morenella is a moth of the family Gelechiidae. It is found in North America, where it has been recorded from California and Arizona.

The wingspan is 16–18 mm. The forewings are deep purplish brown, nearly black, with two longitudinal white stripes. Of these, one is costal, beginning at the base of the wing and running very close to the costal edge and terminates at the apical fifth, while the other white streak covers broadly the dorsal edge from the base to the tornus, where it bends slightly upwards along the terminal edge of the wing in a narrower and fainter spur, obscured by dark scaling. The hindwings are brownish fuscous.
