= Aroga panchuli =

Scientific classification
- Domain: Eukaryota
- Kingdom: Animalia
- Phylum: Arthropoda
- Class: Insecta
- Order: Lepidoptera
- Family: Gelechiidae
- Genus: Aroga
- Species: A. panchuli

Binomial name
- Aroga panchuli Bidzilya, 2009

Species of moth

Aroga panchuli is a moth of the family Gelechiidae. It is found in Tajikistan.

The wingspan is 13.5–15 mm. The larvae feed on Atraphaxis pyrifolia.

== Etymology ==
The species is named for writer Yuri Panchul.
