= Aroga temporariella =

Scientific classification
- Kingdom: Animalia
- Phylum: Arthropoda
- Class: Insecta
- Order: Lepidoptera
- Family: Gelechiidae
- Genus: Aroga
- Species: A. temporariella

Binomial name
- Aroga temporariella Sattler, 1960

Species of moth

Aroga temporariella is a moth of the family Gelechiidae. It is found in France and Spain.
