= Aroga pascuicola =

Scientific classification
- Domain: Eukaryota
- Kingdom: Animalia
- Phylum: Arthropoda
- Class: Insecta
- Order: Lepidoptera
- Family: Gelechiidae
- Genus: Aroga
- Species: A. pascuicola

Binomial name
- Aroga pascuicola (Staudinger, 1871)

Synonyms
- Gelechia pascuicola Staudinger, 1871; Gelechia eremella Chrétien, 1915

Species of moth

Aroga pascuicola is a moth of the family Gelechiidae. It is found in Portugal, Spain and Russia, as well as on Corsica and Sardinia. It has also been recorded from Algeria and Turkey.
