= Aroga eldorada =

Scientific classification
- Domain: Eukaryota
- Kingdom: Animalia
- Phylum: Arthropoda
- Class: Insecta
- Order: Lepidoptera
- Family: Gelechiidae
- Genus: Aroga
- Species: A. eldorada

Binomial name
- Aroga eldorada (Keifer, 1936)

Synonyms
- Gelechia eldorada Keifer, 1936; Aroga eldorado (misspelling)

Species of moth

Aroga eldorada is a moth of the family Gelechiidae. It is found in California.

The wingspan is 15–16 mm. The larvae feed on Artemisia vulgaris and on Adenostoma fasciculatum.
