= Aroga mesostrepta =

Scientific classification
- Kingdom: Animalia
- Phylum: Arthropoda
- Class: Insecta
- Order: Lepidoptera
- Family: Gelechiidae
- Genus: Aroga
- Species: A. mesostrepta

Binomial name
- Aroga mesostrepta (Meyrick, 1932)

Synonyms
- Gelechia mesostrepta Meyrick, 1932

Species of moth

Aroga mesostrepta is a moth of the family Gelechiidae first described by Edward Meyrick in 1932. It is found in Japan, the Russian Far East and Korea.
