= Aroga hulthemiella =

Scientific classification
- Domain: Eukaryota
- Kingdom: Animalia
- Phylum: Arthropoda
- Class: Insecta
- Order: Lepidoptera
- Family: Gelechiidae
- Genus: Aroga
- Species: A. hulthemiella

Binomial name
- Aroga hulthemiella Kuznetsov, 1960

Species of moth

Aroga hulthemiella is a moth of the family Gelechiidae. It is found in northern Iran.
