= Aroga epigaeella =

Scientific classification
- Kingdom: Animalia
- Phylum: Arthropoda
- Clade: Pancrustacea
- Class: Insecta
- Order: Lepidoptera
- Family: Gelechiidae
- Genus: Aroga
- Species: A. epigaeella

Binomial name
- Aroga epigaeella (Chambers, 1881)

Synonyms
- Gelechia epigaeella Chambers, 1881

Species of moth

Aroga epigaeella is a moth of the family Gelechiidae. It is found in North America, where it has been recorded from Georgia, Louisiana, Maine, Maryland, Massachusetts, Mississippi, Oklahoma, South Carolina and Texas.

Adults are dark, purple-brown, with a white costal spot before the apex, and an opposite dorsal one on the forewings. Before these spots, the wing is flecked with a few minute white spots, the two largest of which are on the fold, and there is another at the end of the cell. The costal white spot shows through the wing. The hindwings are fuscous. Adults have been recorded on wing from April to September.

The larvae feed on Epigaea repens .
