= Aroga camptogramma =

Scientific classification
- Kingdom: Animalia
- Phylum: Arthropoda
- Class: Insecta
- Order: Lepidoptera
- Family: Gelechiidae
- Genus: Aroga
- Species: A. camptogramma

Binomial name
- Aroga camptogramma (Meyrick, 1931)

Synonyms
- Gelechia camptogramma Meyrick, 1931

Species of moth

Aroga camptogramma is a moth of the family Gelechiidae. It is found in North America, where it has been recorded from Texas and Arizona.

The wingspan is 8–9 mm.
