= Aroga chlorocrana =

Scientific classification
- Kingdom: Animalia
- Phylum: Arthropoda
- Class: Insecta
- Order: Lepidoptera
- Family: Gelechiidae
- Genus: Aroga
- Species: A. chlorocrana

Binomial name
- Aroga chlorocrana (Meyrick, 1927)

Synonyms
- Gelechia chlorocrana Meyrick, 1927

Species of moth

Aroga chlorocrana is a moth of the family Gelechiidae. It is found in North America, where it has been recorded from Texas.

The wingspan is about 19 mm. The forewings are blackish-fuscous. The hindwings are light grey with an expansible whitish hairpencil from the base lying along the edge of the costa to near the middle.
