= Aroga acharnaea =

Scientific classification
- Kingdom: Animalia
- Phylum: Arthropoda
- Class: Insecta
- Order: Lepidoptera
- Family: Gelechiidae
- Genus: Aroga
- Species: A. acharnaea

Binomial name
- Aroga acharnaea (Meyrick, 1927)

Synonyms
- Gelechia acharnaea Meyrick, 1927

Species of moth

Aroga acharnaea is a moth of the family Gelechiidae. It is found in North America, where it has been recorded from Texas.

The wingspan is about 20 mm. The forewings are grey irregularly mixed whitish, with the veins on the costal half partially marked with black streaks and with a spot of white suffusion on the costa at three-fourths, preceded by a spot of blackish suffusion. The hindwings are grey, in males with an expansible ochreous-whitish hairpencil from the base lying along the costal edge to near the middle.
