= Aroga gozmanyi =

Scientific classification
- Domain: Eukaryota
- Kingdom: Animalia
- Phylum: Arthropoda
- Class: Insecta
- Order: Lepidoptera
- Family: Gelechiidae
- Genus: Aroga
- Species: A. gozmanyi

Binomial name
- Aroga gozmanyi Park, 1991

Species of moth

Aroga gozmanyi is a moth of the family Gelechiidae. It is found in North Korea.

The wingspan is 14–16 mm.
