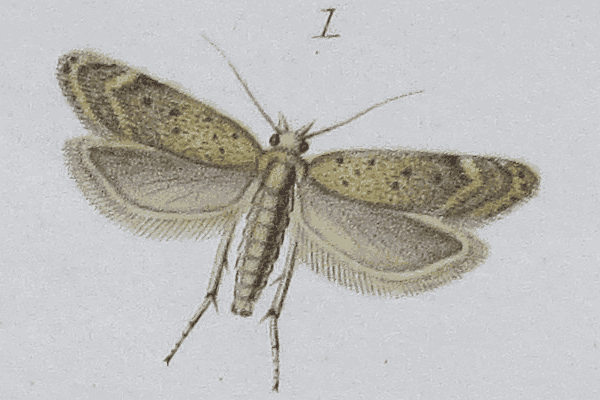

Scientific classification
- Domain: Eukaryota
- Kingdom: Animalia
- Phylum: Arthropoda
- Class: Insecta
- Order: Lepidoptera
- Family: Gelechiidae
- Genus: Aroga
- Species: A. aristotelis

Binomial name
- Aroga aristotelis (Millière, 1876)

Synonyms
- Gelechia aristotelis Millière, 1876; Gelechia astragali Staudinger, 1879; Gelechia fulminella Millière, 1883; Gelechia lacertella Walsingham, 1904; Gelechia aplasticella Rebel, 1913; Gelechia hyrcanella Toll, 1947

= Aroga aristotelis =

Species of moth

Aroga aristotelis is a moth of the family Gelechiidae. It is found in France, Spain, Italy, Ukraine, Romania, Bulgaria and Greece, as well as on Crete, Sicily and the Canary Islands. It has also been recorded from Turkey, Israel, the Ural Mountains, Iran and Turkmenistan.

The larvae feed on Astragalus echinus. They mine the leaves of their host plant. The larvae can be found from May to June.
