= Aroga leucanieella =

Scientific classification
- Domain: Eukaryota
- Kingdom: Animalia
- Phylum: Arthropoda
- Class: Insecta
- Order: Lepidoptera
- Family: Gelechiidae
- Genus: Aroga
- Species: A. leucanieella

Binomial name
- Aroga leucanieella (Busck, 1910)

Synonyms
- Gelechia leucanieella Busck, 1910

Species of moth

Aroga leucanieella is a moth of the family Gelechiidae. It is found in North America, where it has been recorded from California.

The wingspan is about 12 mm. The forewings are bluish black, with the tips of the scales black, while the bases are ochreous and the middle part bluish. There is a costal yellow spot at the apical third, which is faintly connected with an opposite dorsal yellow spot by a slight transverse fascia. There are two small yellow dashes on the cell near the base, followed by black scales. The hindwings are dark fuscous.
