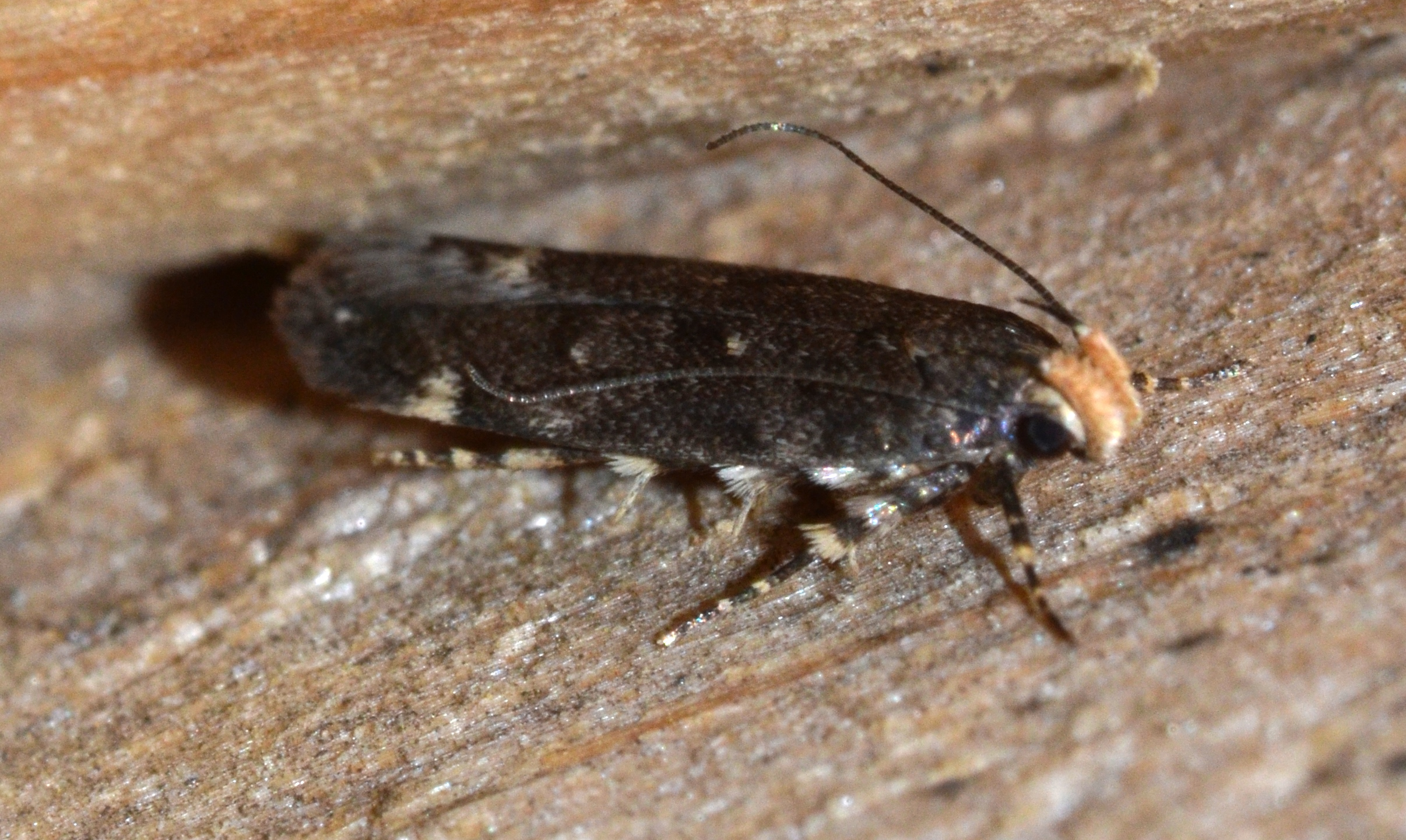

Scientific classification
- Kingdom: Animalia
- Phylum: Arthropoda
- Clade: Pancrustacea
- Class: Insecta
- Order: Lepidoptera
- Family: Gelechiidae
- Genus: Aroga
- Species: A. trialbamaculella

Binomial name
- Aroga trialbamaculella (Chambers, 1875)

Synonyms
- Gelechia trialbamaculella Chambers, 1875

= Aroga trialbamaculella =

Species of moth

Aroga trialbamaculella, the red-striped fireworm moth, is a moth of the family Gelechiidae. It is found in the United States, where it has been recorded from Maine to Florida and from Illinois to Texas.

The wingspan is about 12 mm. The forewings are dark brown with a small white spot on the fold before the middle. There also white spots at the costa and dorsally before the cilia. Adults are mostly on wing from March to October, but have been recorded year round.

The larvae feed on Comptonia, Epigaea, Myrtus, Quercus ilicifolia, Quercus laevis, Robinia and Vaccinium ashei. They skeletonize the leaves of their host plant. They fasten two or more leaves together and feed within on the epidermis. With the frass, they form a tube which is open on both sides. The larvae reach a length of about 8 mm. They are pale dirty yellowish or greenish yellow with six darker yellow stripes.
