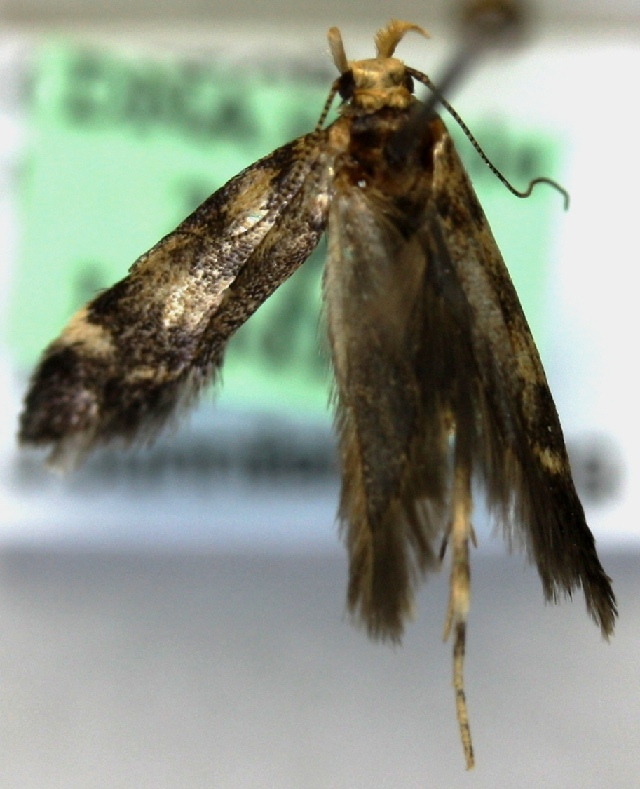

Scientific classification
- Kingdom: Animalia
- Phylum: Arthropoda
- Clade: Pancrustacea
- Class: Insecta
- Order: Lepidoptera
- Family: Gelechiidae
- Genus: Aroga
- Species: A. balcanicola

Binomial name
- Aroga balcanicola Huemer & Karsholt, 1999

= Aroga balcanicola =

Species of moth

Aroga balcanicola is a moth of the family Gelechiidae. It is found in North Macedonia and Greece.
