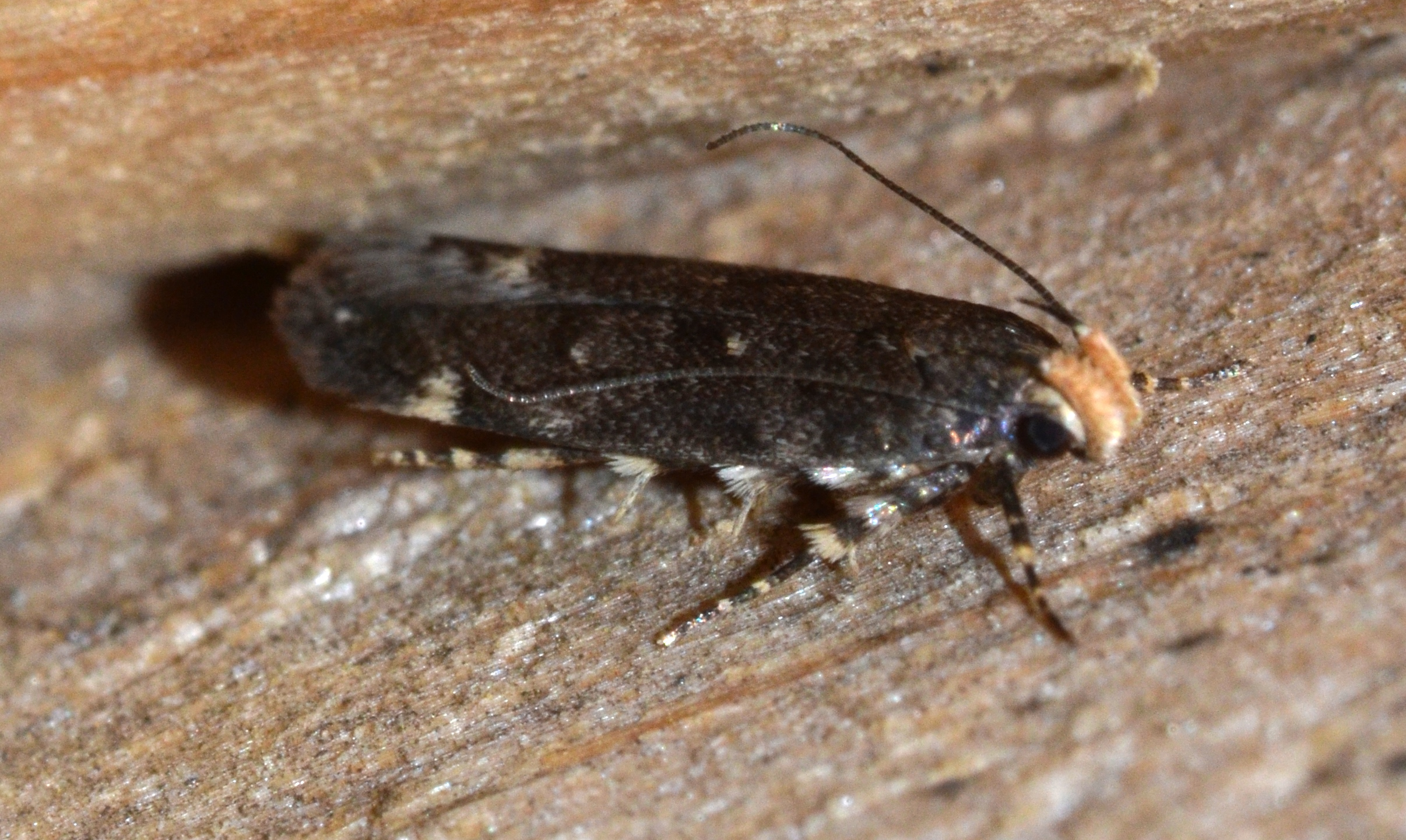
- Aroga trialbamaculella

Scientific classification
- Domain: Eukaryota
- Kingdom: Animalia
- Phylum: Arthropoda
- Class: Insecta
- Order: Lepidoptera
- Family: Gelechiidae
- Tribe: Gelechiini
- Genus: Aroga; Busck, 1914

= Aroga =

Genus of moths

Aroga is a genus of moths in the family Gelechiidae.

== Species ==
- Aroga acharnaea (Meyrick, 1927)
- Aroga alleriella Busck, 1940
- Aroga argutiola Hodges, 1974
- Aroga aristotelis (Milliere, 1876)
- Aroga atraphaxi Bidzilya, 2009
- Aroga balcanicola Huemer & Karsholt, 1999
- Aroga camptogramma (Meyrick, 1931)
- Aroga chlorocrana (Meyrick, 1931)
- Aroga compositella (Walker, 1864)
- Aroga controvalva Li & Zheng, 1998
- Aroga danfengensis Li & Zheng, 1998
- Aroga elaboratella (Braun, 1923)
- Aroga eldorada (Keifer, 1936)
- Aroga epigaeella (Chambers, 1881)
- Aroga eriogonella (Clarke, 1935)
- Aroga flavicomella (Zeller, 1839)
- Aroga gozmanyi Park, 1991
- Aroga hulthemiella Kuznetsov, 1960
- Aroga kurdistana Derra, 2011
- Aroga leucanieella (Busck, 1910)
- Aroga mesostrepta Meyrick, 1932
- Aroga morenella (Busck, 1908)
- Aroga panchuli Bidzilya, 2009
- Aroga paraplutella (Busck, 1910)
- Aroga pascuicola (Staudinger, 1871)
- Aroga paulella (Busck, 1903)
- Aroga rigidae (Clarke, 1935)
- Aroga temporariella Sattler, 1960
- Aroga thoracealbella (Chambers, 1874)
- Aroga trialbamaculella (Chambers, 1875)
- Aroga trilineella (Chambers, 1877)
- Aroga unifasciella (Busck, 1903)
- Aroga velocella (Duponchel, 1838)
- Aroga websteri Clarke, 1942
- Aroga xyloglypta (Meyrick, 1923)
