= Aroga thoracealbella =

Scientific classification
- Kingdom: Animalia
- Phylum: Arthropoda
- Clade: Pancrustacea
- Class: Insecta
- Order: Lepidoptera
- Family: Gelechiidae
- Genus: Aroga
- Species: A. thoracealbella

Binomial name
- Aroga thoracealbella (Chambers, 1874)

Synonyms
- Gelechia thoracealbella Chambers, 1874; Gelechia minimaculella Chambers, 1874

Species of moth

Aroga thoracealbella is a moth of the family Gelechiidae. It is found in North America, where it has been recorded from Texas.

The wings are brown, the forewings very faintly streaked with whitish towards the apex.
