= Aroga unifasciella =

Scientific classification
- Domain: Eukaryota
- Kingdom: Animalia
- Phylum: Arthropoda
- Class: Insecta
- Order: Lepidoptera
- Family: Gelechiidae
- Genus: Aroga
- Species: A. unifasciella

Binomial name
- Aroga unifasciella (Busck, 1903)

Synonyms
- Gelechia unifasciella Busck, 1903

Species of moth

Aroga unifasciella is a moth of the family Gelechiidae. It is found in North America, where it has been recorded from Montana south to western New Mexico, west through Arizona to eastern and southern California.

The wingspan is about 18 mm. The forewings are deep bronzy black, with the dorsal edge below the fold, from the base to cilia white, and with a white narrow inwardly curved fascia at the apical fourth. The black part of the wing is slightly sprinkled with minute bluish white atoms. The hindwings are shining light fuscous. Adults are on wing from July to September.
