= Entiat Slopes Natural Area Preserve =

Natural area in Washington state, US

Coordinates: 47.6472°N 120.2626°W

Entiat Slopes Natural Area Preserve in Chelan County, Washington is part of the Washington Natural Areas Program. It protects 1,920 acres (780 ha) of largely steep terrain dropping to the edge of the Columbia River. It contains one of the largest populations of Thompson's clover, a Washington State threatened species. The site has apparently evolved in response to frequent wildfires.
