= Aroga argutiola =

Scientific classification
- Kingdom: Animalia
- Phylum: Arthropoda
- Class: Insecta
- Order: Lepidoptera
- Family: Gelechiidae
- Genus: Aroga
- Species: A. argutiola

Binomial name
- Aroga argutiola Hodges, 1974

Species of moth

Aroga argutiola is a moth of the family Gelechiidae. It is widespread in eastern North America.

Adults have been recorded on wing from April to September.

Larvae have been reared on Comptonia peregrina, but have also been recorded on Myrica aspleniifolia.
