= Aroga xyloglypta =

Scientific classification
- Kingdom: Animalia
- Phylum: Arthropoda
- Class: Insecta
- Order: Lepidoptera
- Family: Gelechiidae
- Genus: Aroga
- Species: A. xyloglypta

Binomial name
- Aroga xyloglypta (Meyrick, 1923)

Synonyms
- Gelechia xyloglypta Meyrick, 1923

Species of moth

Aroga xyloglypta is a moth of the family Gelechiidae first described by Edward Meyrick in 1923. It is found in North America, where it has been recorded from California.

The wingspan is about 15 mm. The forewings are brown, with some scattered gray and black scales. The costa is irregularly suffused with blackish gray from the base to two-thirds, as well as some grayish suffusion in the disc from the base to the end of the cell, and an oblique fasciate blotch of dark gray suffusion from the costa at one-fourth running into this. The discal stigmata are blackish, the plical obsolete. There is a transverse shade of brown ground color at three-fourths undefined anteriorly but with the posterior edge angularly projecting in the middle, and the apical area beyond it suffused with gray. The hindwings are gray.
