= Aroga paulella =

Scientific classification
- Kingdom: Animalia
- Phylum: Arthropoda
- Clade: Pancrustacea
- Class: Insecta
- Order: Lepidoptera
- Family: Gelechiidae
- Genus: Aroga
- Species: A. paulella

Binomial name
- Aroga paulella (Busck, 1903)

Synonyms
- Gelechia paulella Busck, 1903

Species of moth

Aroga paulella is a moth of the family Gelechiidae. It is found in North America, where it has been recorded from Arizona, California, Colorado, Kansas, New Mexico, Texas and Wyoming.

The wingspan is 13–23 mm. The forewings are shining dark blackish brown with white markings. The entire dorsal edge is white, reaching up the fold except right at the base and slightly crossing the fold with an upward projection at the apical third of the wing. Beginning at the basal one-fourth of the costa and reaching the costal white part is a sharply defined outwardly directed white fascia. At the apical fourth of the wing and nearly perpendicular on the costal edge is another narrower white fascia, somewhat dilated on the costal edge. The hindwings are silvery pale grey.
