= Aroga alleriella =

Scientific classification
- Domain: Eukaryota
- Kingdom: Animalia
- Phylum: Arthropoda
- Class: Insecta
- Order: Lepidoptera
- Family: Gelechiidae
- Genus: Aroga
- Species: A. alleriella

Binomial name
- Aroga alleriella Busck, 1940

Species of moth

Aroga alleriella is a moth of the family Gelechiidae. It is found in North America, where it has been recorded from Alabama and Florida.

The wingspan is 17–22 mm.

The larvae feed on Polygonum maritunum.
