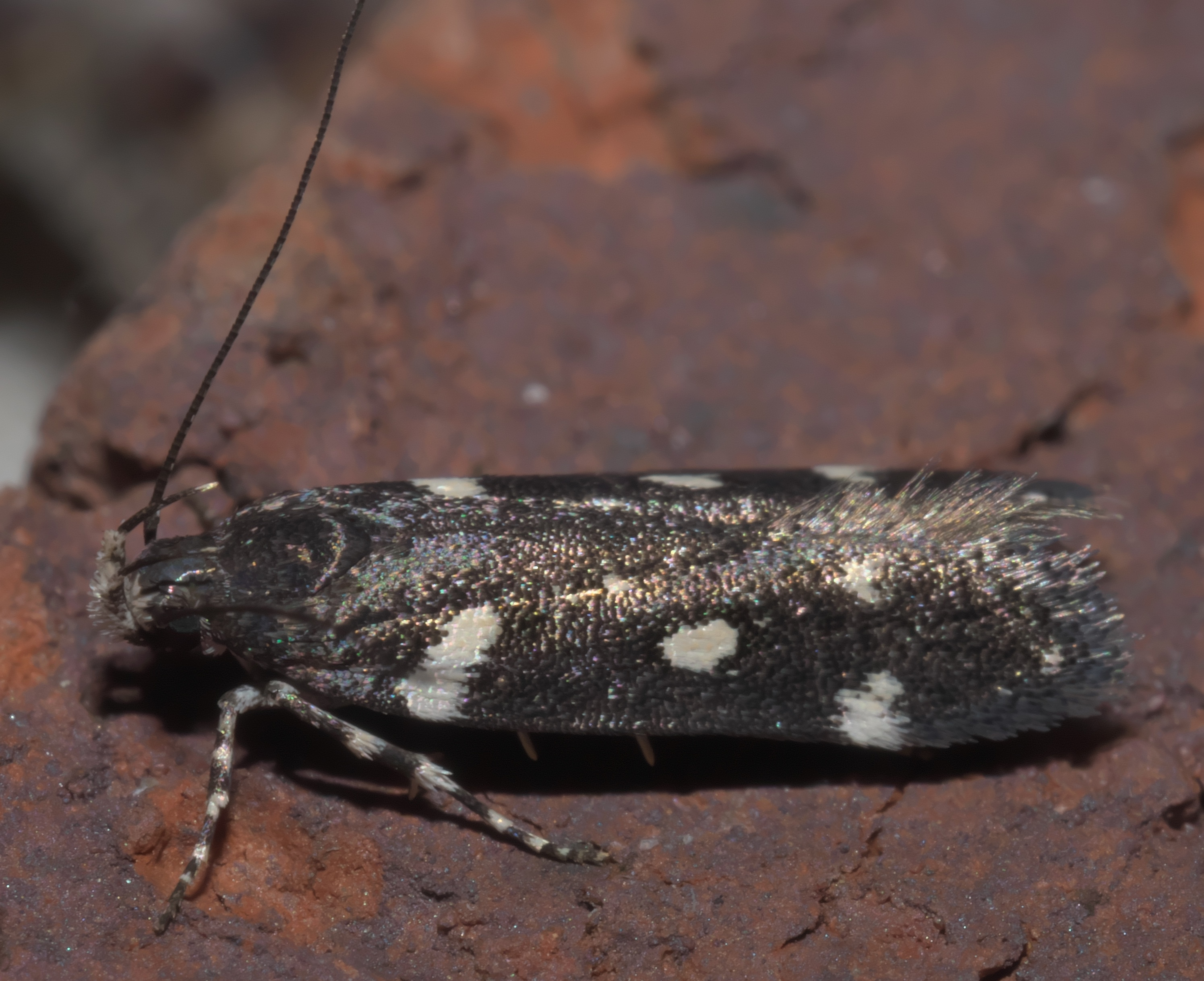

Scientific classification
- Domain: Eukaryota
- Kingdom: Animalia
- Phylum: Arthropoda
- Class: Insecta
- Order: Lepidoptera
- Family: Gelechiidae
- Genus: Aroga
- Species: A. compositella

Binomial name
- Aroga compositella (Walker, 1864)

Synonyms
- Oecophora compositella Walker, 1864; Gelechia coloradensis Busck, 1903; Gelechia speculifera Meyrick, 1931

= Aroga compositella =

Six-spotted aroga

Species of moth

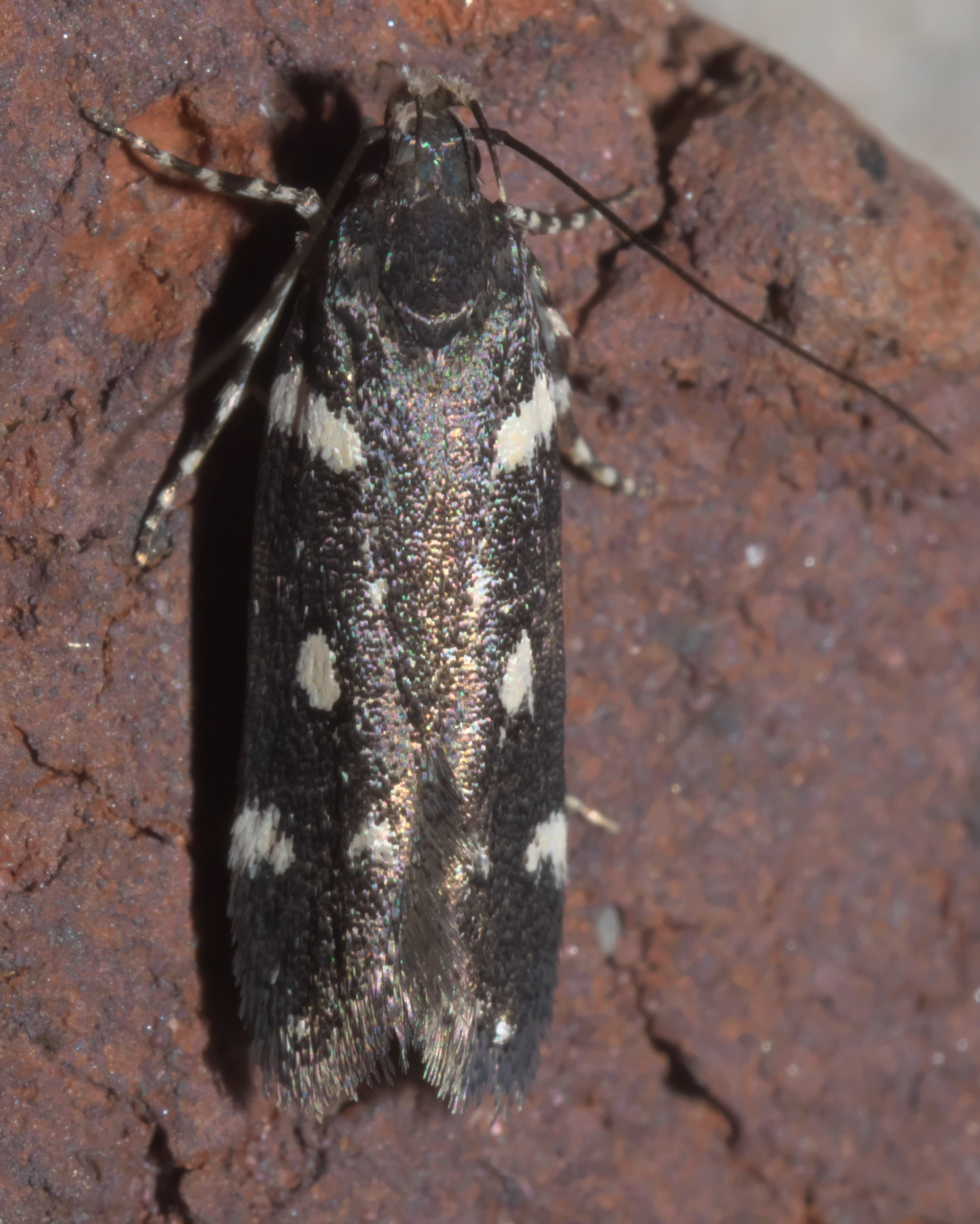
Aroga compositella, six-spotted aroga, Size: 9.2 mm

Aroga compositella, the six-spotted aroga, is a moth of the family Gelechiidae. It is found in the United States, where it has been recorded from Alabama, Colorado, Florida, Georgia, Louisiana, Maine, Massachusetts, Mississippi, New Hampshire, North Carolina, Oklahoma, South Carolina, Tennessee, Texas, and Wisconsin.

== Description ==
The wingspan is 15–16 mm. The forewings are deep purplish black with five pure white markings, namely, an outwardly oblique costal white streak near the base, reaching the fold. An elliptical white spot is found on the middle of the wing and there is an angulate white costal spot at the beginning of the cilia, as well as an opposite small dorsal white spot and a small white dot on the fold, below and forward of the central spot. Just before the apex a few single white scales are found. The hindwings are dark fuscous.
