= Aroga trilineella =

Scientific classification
- Kingdom: Animalia
- Phylum: Arthropoda
- Clade: Pancrustacea
- Class: Insecta
- Order: Lepidoptera
- Family: Gelechiidae
- Genus: Aroga
- Species: A. trilineella

Binomial name
- Aroga trilineella (Chambers, 1877)

Synonyms
- Gelechia trilineella Chambers, 1877; Gelechia bispiculata Meyrick, 1923; Gelechia hipposaris Meyrick, 1927

Species of moth

Aroga trilineella is a moth of the family Gelechiidae. It is found in North America, where it has been recorded from Texas, Arizona, Colorado and California.

The wingspan is about 19 mm. The forewings are pale grey irregularly mixed brownish with scattered dark grey specks, a broad fuscous suffusion occupying the median longitudinal third from the base and whole apical area, which is preceded by an undefined transverse shade of light ground colour. There is a black streak along the fold from near the base to beyond one-third, and one in the disc from above the apex of this to the end of the cell. The hindwings are grey, lighter in the disc anteriorly.
