= Aroga websteri =

Scientific classification
- Domain: Eukaryota
- Kingdom: Animalia
- Phylum: Arthropoda
- Class: Insecta
- Order: Lepidoptera
- Family: Gelechiidae
- Genus: Aroga
- Species: A. websteri

Binomial name
- Aroga websteri Clarke, 1942

Species of moth

Aroga websteri is a moth of the family Gelechiidae. It is found in North America, where it has been recorded from Washington.

The wingspan is 14–16 mm.

== Etymology ==
The species is named for Dr. R. L. Webster, former head of the Department of Zoology, Washington State College.
