= Aroga controvalva =

Scientific classification
- Kingdom: Animalia
- Phylum: Arthropoda
- Class: Insecta
- Order: Lepidoptera
- Family: Gelechiidae
- Genus: Aroga
- Species: A. controvalva

Binomial name
- Aroga controvalva Li & Zheng, 1998

Species of moth

Aroga controvalva is a moth of the family Gelechiidae. It is found in China (Shaanxi).

The wingspan is about 18 mm.
