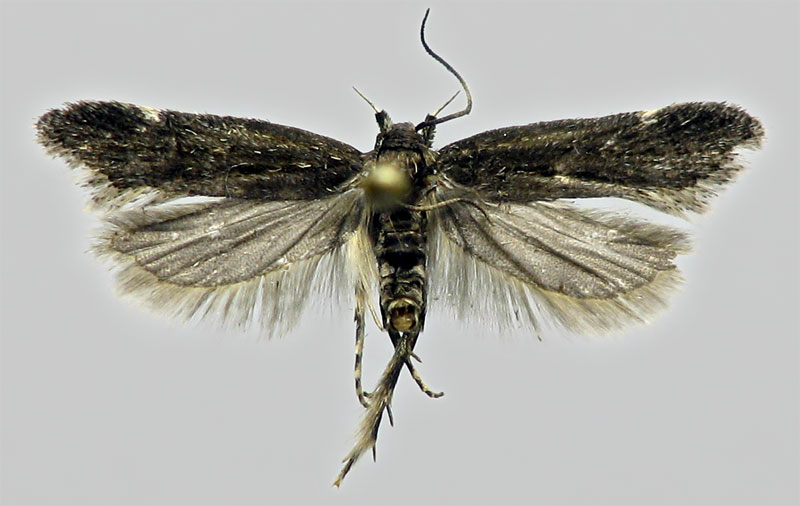

Scientific classification
- Kingdom: Animalia
- Phylum: Arthropoda
- Clade: Pancrustacea
- Class: Insecta
- Order: Lepidoptera
- Family: Gelechiidae
- Genus: Aroga
- Species: A. velocella

Binomial name
- Aroga velocella (Zeller, 1839)

Synonyms
- Lita velocella Zeller, 1839; Lita subsequella Treitschke, 1833; Anacampsis nebulea Stephens, 1835; Lita affiniella Zetterstedt, 1839; Lita tesserella Zetterstedt, 1839; Gelechia velocella var. brunnea Schöyen, 1882; Gelechia velocella var. aterrimella Rebel, 1889; Gelechia peperistis Meyrick, 1926; Gelechia rupicolella Müller-Rutz, 1934

= Aroga velocella =

Species of moth

Aroga velocella is a moth of the family Gelechiidae. It is found in most of Europe, except for Ireland, Iceland and Croatia. Outside of Europe, it is found in Turkey, the Caucasus and Siberia (Transbaikalia).

The wingspan is 14–19 mm. Adults are on wing in May and again in August. There are two generations per year.

The larvae feed on Rumex acetosella. The larva feeds in a silken gallery at the base of the plant.
