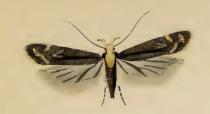

Scientific classification
- Kingdom: Animalia
- Phylum: Arthropoda
- Clade: Pancrustacea
- Class: Insecta
- Order: Lepidoptera
- Family: Gelechiidae
- Genus: Aroga
- Species: A. flavicomella

Binomial name
- Aroga flavicomella (Zeller, 1839)

Synonyms
- Gelechia flavicomella Zeller, 1839; Anacampsis flavicomella var. aureodorsella Bruand, 1859

= Aroga flavicomella =

Species of moth

Aroga flavicomella is a moth of the family Gelechiidae. It is found in most of Europe, except Ireland, Great Britain, the Benelux, Denmark, Fennoscandia, the Baltic region, Portugal and the western and southern part of the Balkan Peninsula. It has also been recorded from Turkey, the Middle East, Mongolia, Korea and Central Asia, including Kyrgyzstan.

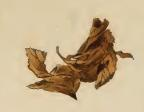
Leaves of sloe fastened together and eaten by larva

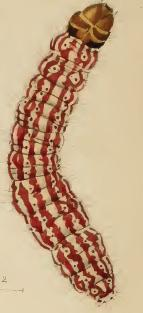
Larva

The wingspan is 15–17 mm. Adults are on wing from May to June.

The larvae feed on Prunus spinosa, Prunus domestica and Prunus cerasus. They feed from within tied together leaves. Larvae can be found from fall to April.
