= Aroga elaboratella =

Scientific classification
- Domain: Eukaryota
- Kingdom: Animalia
- Phylum: Arthropoda
- Class: Insecta
- Order: Lepidoptera
- Family: Gelechiidae
- Genus: Aroga
- Species: A. elaboratella

Binomial name
- Aroga elaboratella (Braun, 1923)

Synonyms
- Gelechia elaboratella Braun, 1923; Gelechia trachycosma Meyrick, 1923; Aroga trachycosma

Species of moth

Aroga elaboratella is a moth of the family Gelechiidae. It is found in North America, where it has been recorded from California and Baja California.

Its wingspan is 14–17 mm. The forewings are dark grey irrorated whitish with a slender whitish streak suffused ochreous-brownish beneath the costa from the base to one-fourth. The dorsal area beneath the fold is suffused whitish and more or less mixed brown, with a brown basal blotch more or less expressed. There is a narrow rather oblique white fascia from the costa at one-fifth to the dorsal pale area, edged black anteriorly on the costa and in the middle, and followed by elongate marks of black suffusion beneath the costa and on the fold, the latter ending in a small black tuft representing the plical stigma. The discal stigma is also represented by raised black scales, with some brownish scales adjacent, the first discal somewhat beyond the plical, between the discal a patch of whitish suffusion extending to the costa, and before the first a spot of whitish suffusion beneath the costa. There are some scattered blackish raised scales towards the dorsum in the middle, as well as a well-marked white streak from three-fourths of the costa to the tornus, moderately angulated in the middle. The hindwings are grey-whitish.
