= Aroga paraplutella =

Scientific classification
- Domain: Eukaryota
- Kingdom: Animalia
- Phylum: Arthropoda
- Class: Insecta
- Order: Lepidoptera
- Family: Gelechiidae
- Genus: Aroga
- Species: A. paraplutella

Binomial name
- Aroga paraplutella (Busck, 1910)

Synonyms
- Gelechia paraplutella Busck, 1910

Species of moth

Aroga paraplutella is a moth of the family Gelechiidae. It is found in North America, where it has been recorded from California and Arizona.

The wingspan is 11–12 mm. The forewings are blackish fuscous with the entire dorsal part below the fold light reddish yellow. The hindwings are light fuscous.
