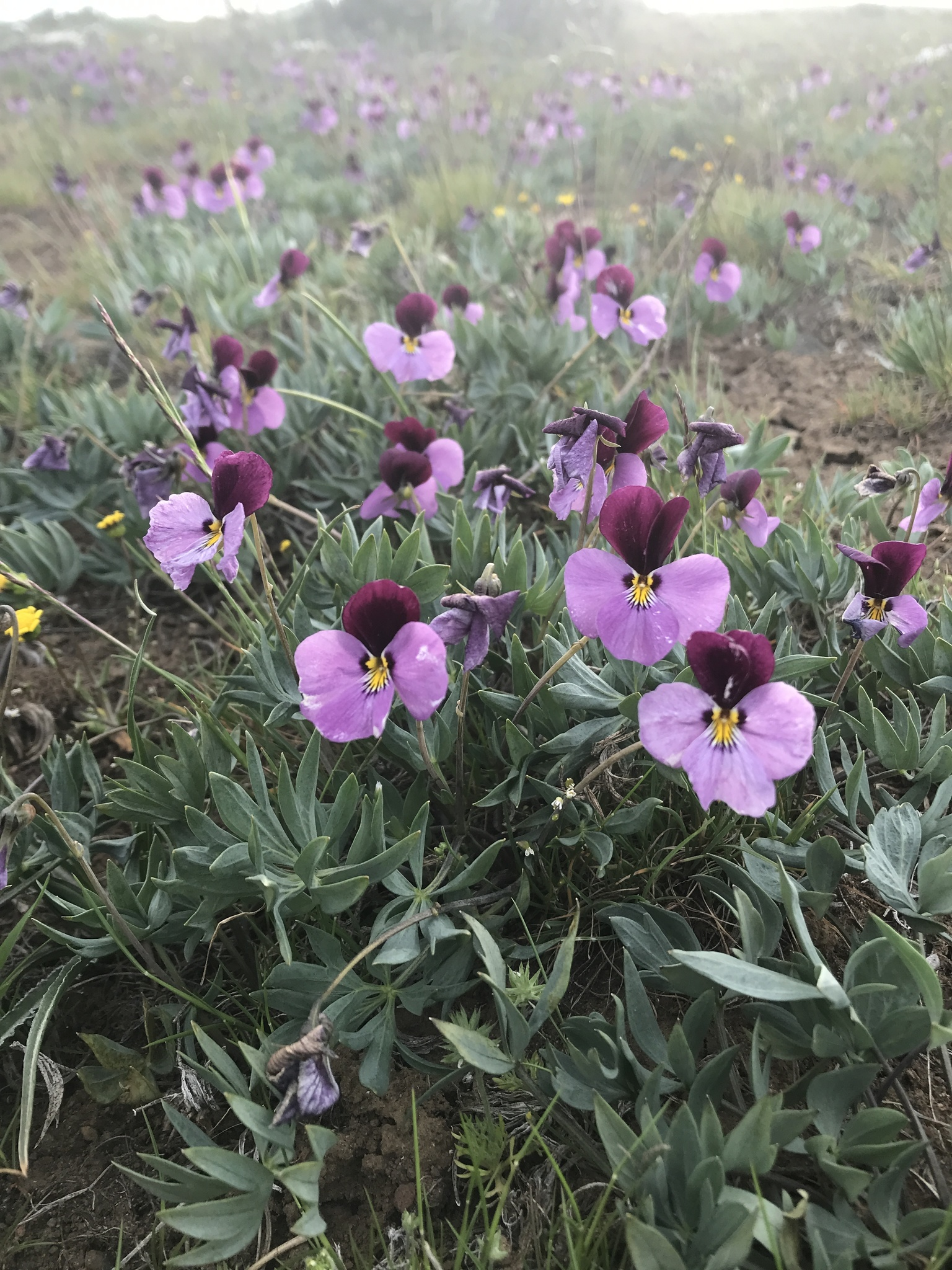

Scientific classification
- Kingdom: Plantae
- Clade: Tracheophytes
- Clade: Angiosperms
- Clade: Eudicots
- Clade: Rosids
- Order: Malpighiales
- Family: Violaceae
- Genus: Viola
- Species: V. trinervata

Binomial name
- Viola trinervata (Howell) Howell ex A.Gray

= Viola trinervata =

Species of wildflower

Viola trinervata, the sagebrush violet, is a species of wildflower in the Violaceae family which is found in eastern Washington and Oregon.

== Description ==
Sagebrush violet is a low growing perennial herb that produces a cluster of palmate leathery leaves with prominent veins. Each palmate leaf appears at the end of a hairless stem emerging from the ground, and each leaflet has three prominent veins (whence trinervata), one in the center and two of them at or close to each leaflet edge. The showy flowers form in the spring and arise singly from basal stems. The upper two flower petals are dark purple and the lower three petals are a paler lilac (sometimes white) with a yellow base, often with radiating darker purple lines. Full technical description at Flora of North America.

== Range and habitat ==
The sagebrush violet grows in seasonally moist big sagebrush habitat and nearby rocky hillsides on the Columbia River plateau in Washington and Oregon states at elevations of 400 to 1200 meters. Though the range of the sagebrush violet is not extensive, it is often locally common.

== Ecology ==
The sagebrush violet seeds have a fleshy elaiosome, suggesting that they are dispersed in part by ants.

== Gallery ==
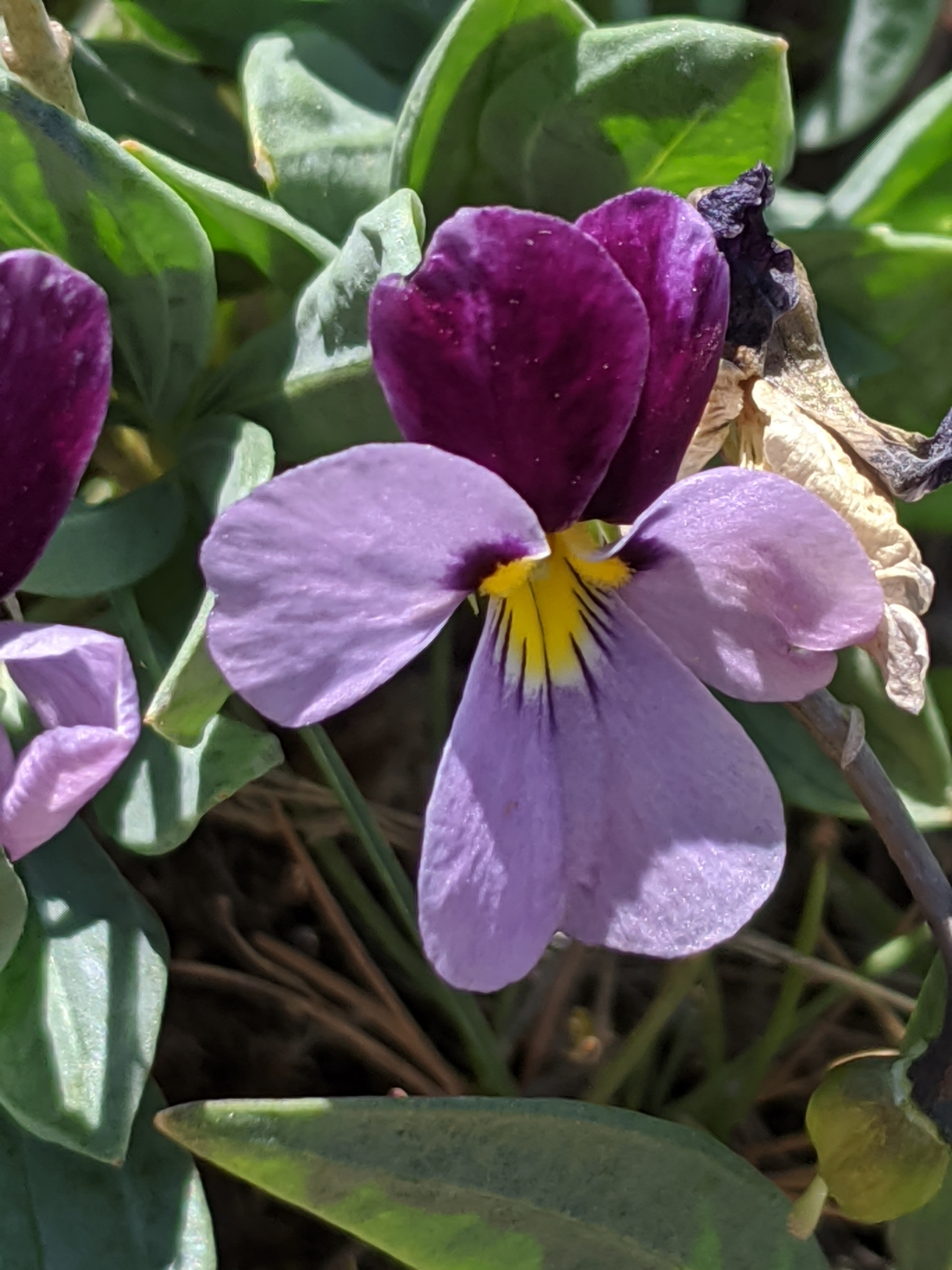
Viola trinervata flower closeup

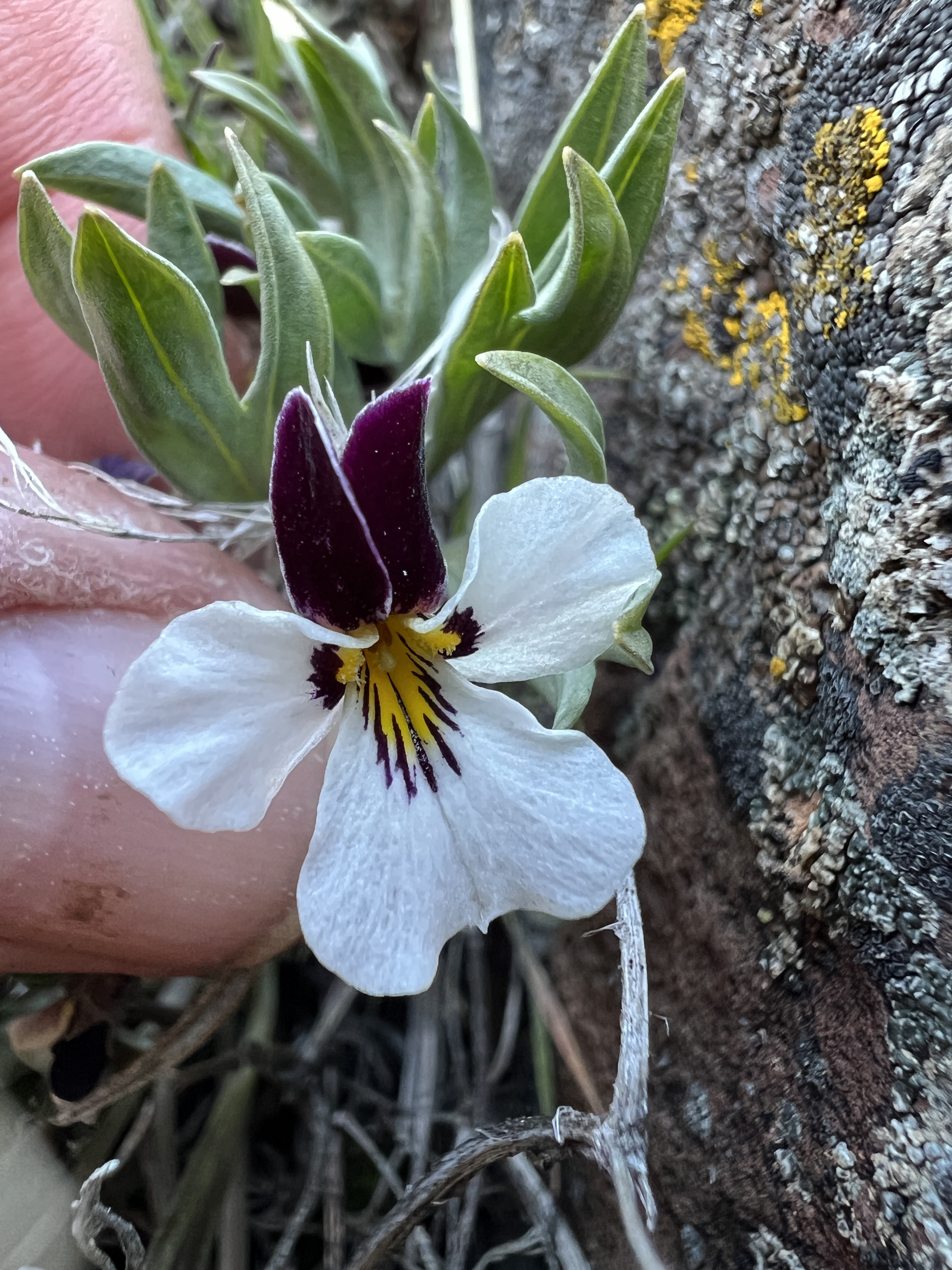
White flower form

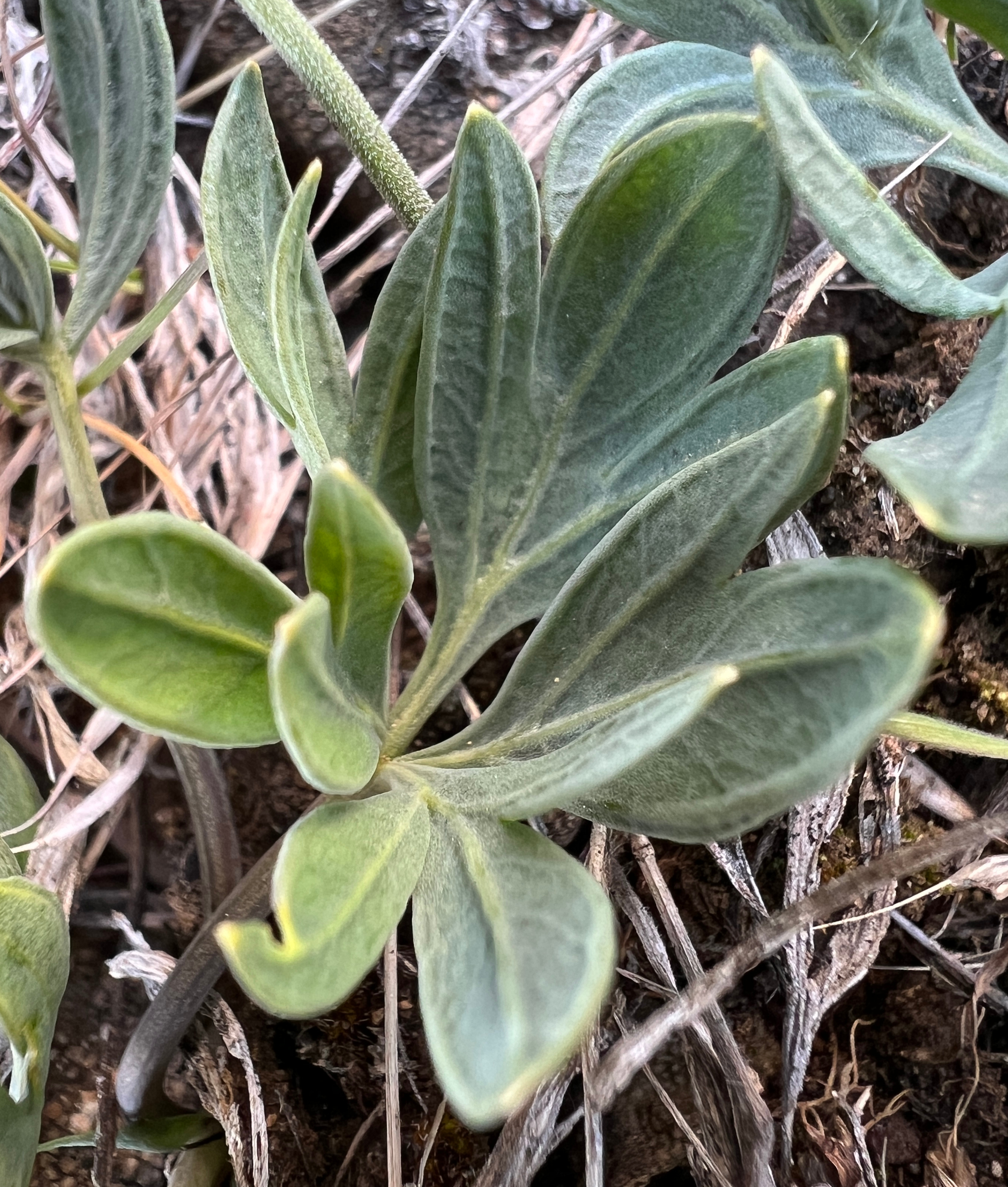
Leaf closeup
