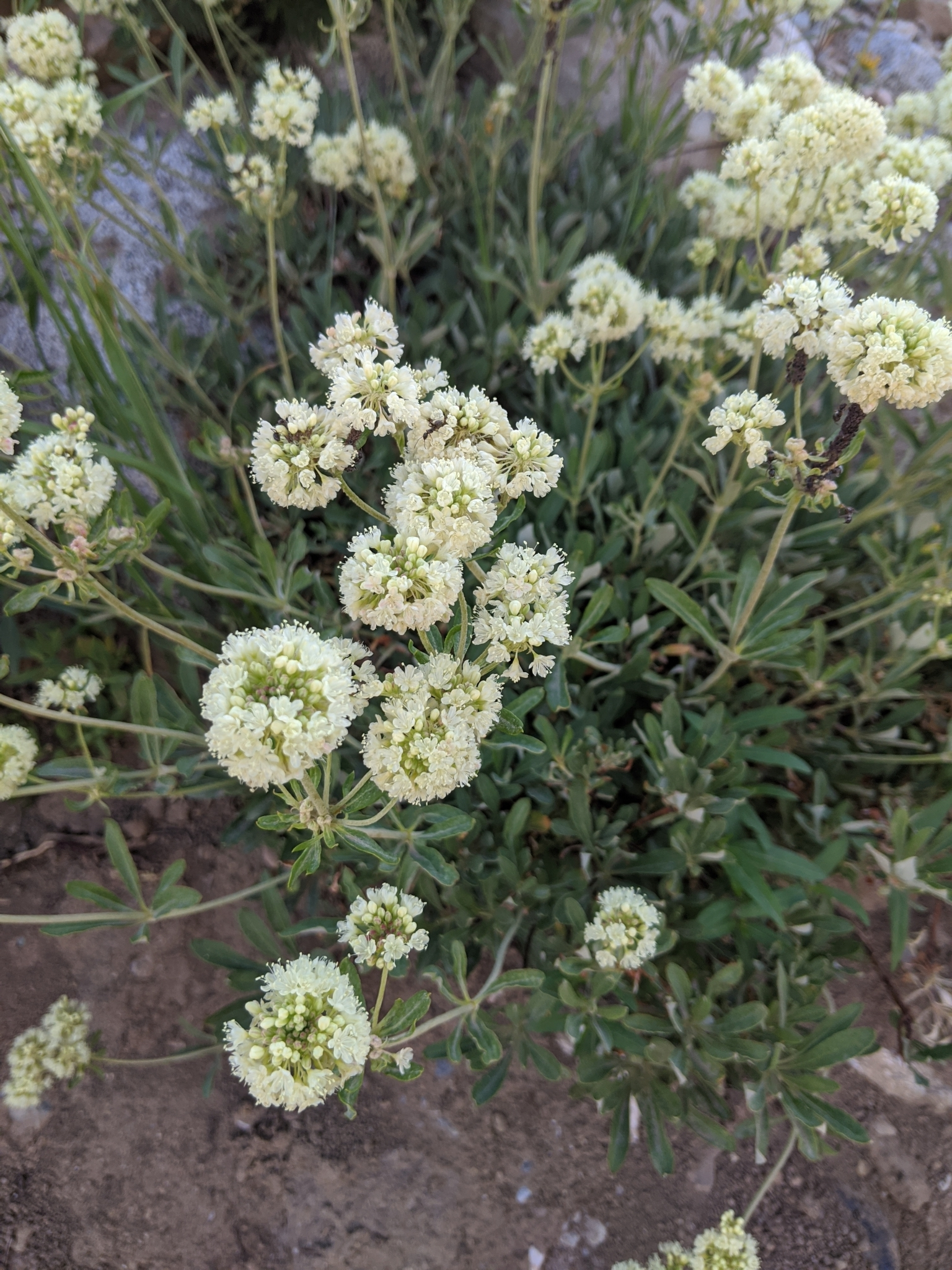

Conservation status
- Secure (NatureServe)

Scientific classification
- Kingdom: Plantae
- Clade: Embryophytes
- Clade: Tracheophytes
- Clade: Angiosperms
- Clade: Eudicots
- Order: Caryophyllales
- Family: Polygonaceae
- Genus: Eriogonum
- Species: E. heracleoides

Binomial name
- Eriogonum heracleoides Nutt.

Varieties
- E. h. var. heracleoides; E. h. var. leucophaeum

Synonyms
- Eriogonum angustifolium; Eriogonum gyrophyllum; Eriogonum umbellatum

= Eriogonum heracleoides =

Species of wild buckwheat

Eriogonum heracleoides (common names; parsnipflower buckwheat, whorled buckwheat, and Wyeth buckwheat) is a plant of western North America that has many flowering clusters which are usually cream colored, or off-white. It can usually be found in rocky areas, such as sagebrush deserts and Ponderosa pine forests. Parsnipflower buckwheat is in the genus Eriogonum and the family Polygonaceae, which is a family of plants known as the "knotweed family". It inhabits much of the western part of the United States and southern British Columbia.

== Description ==
The parsnipflower buckwheat is an erect herbaceous perennial plant rarely more than 40 cm (15 3/4 in) tall. Blooming early in the summer, its flowers measure 4–9 mm (1/8–3/8 in); these are pale yellow and redden with age. The leaves are arranged in loose rosettes, covered with soft hairs measuring 5–30 mm (1/4–1 1/8 in). The hairs feel woolly and matted, and cover both sides of the leaf. The flowers have one carpel (achene). The plant has a whorled arrangement of leaves at midpoint of the stem as well as one beneath the base of the stems. It blooms in early to mid summer. It attracts butterflies, bees, insects, and birds and is the host plant for several Palouse butterflies.

== Taxonomy ==
In 1834 Thomas Nuttall described and named Eriogonum heracleoides, placing it with the other species in the Eriogonum genus. It in turn is classified in the Polygonaceae family. The species has two accepted varieties.

- Eriogonum heracleoides var. heracleoides – Native from British Columbia to Colorado
- Eriogonum heracleoides var. leucophaeum – Native to just Washington and Idaho

Eriogonum heracleoides has eleven synonyms, one of the species and ten of variety heracleoides.

Table of Synonyms
Name	Year	Rank	Synonym of:	Notes
Eriogonum angustifolium Nutt.	1848	species	var. heracleoides	= het.
Eriogonum gyrophyllum Nutt.	1848	species	var. heracleoides	= het.
Eriogonum heracleoides subsp. angustifolium (Nutt.) Piper	1906	subspecies	var. heracleoides	= het.
Eriogonum heracleoides var. angustifolium (Nutt.) Torr. & A.Gray	1870	variety	var. heracleoides	= het.
Eriogonum heracleoides var. micranthum Gand.	1906	variety	var. heracleoides	= het.
Eriogonum heracleoides var. minus Benth.	1856	variety	var. heracleoides	= het.
Eriogonum heracleoides var. multiceps Gand.	1906	variety	var. heracleoides	= het.
Eriogonum heracleoides var. rydbergii Gand.	1906	variety	var. heracleoides	= het.
Eriogonum heracleoides subsp. typicum S.Stokes	1936	subspecies	E. heracleoides	≡ hom., not validly publ.
Eriogonum heracleoides var. viride Gand.	1906	variety	var. heracleoides	= het.
Eriogonum umbellatum Benth.	1836	species	var. heracleoides	= het., nom. illeg. homonym. post.
Notes: ≡ homotypic synonym; = heterotypic synonym
