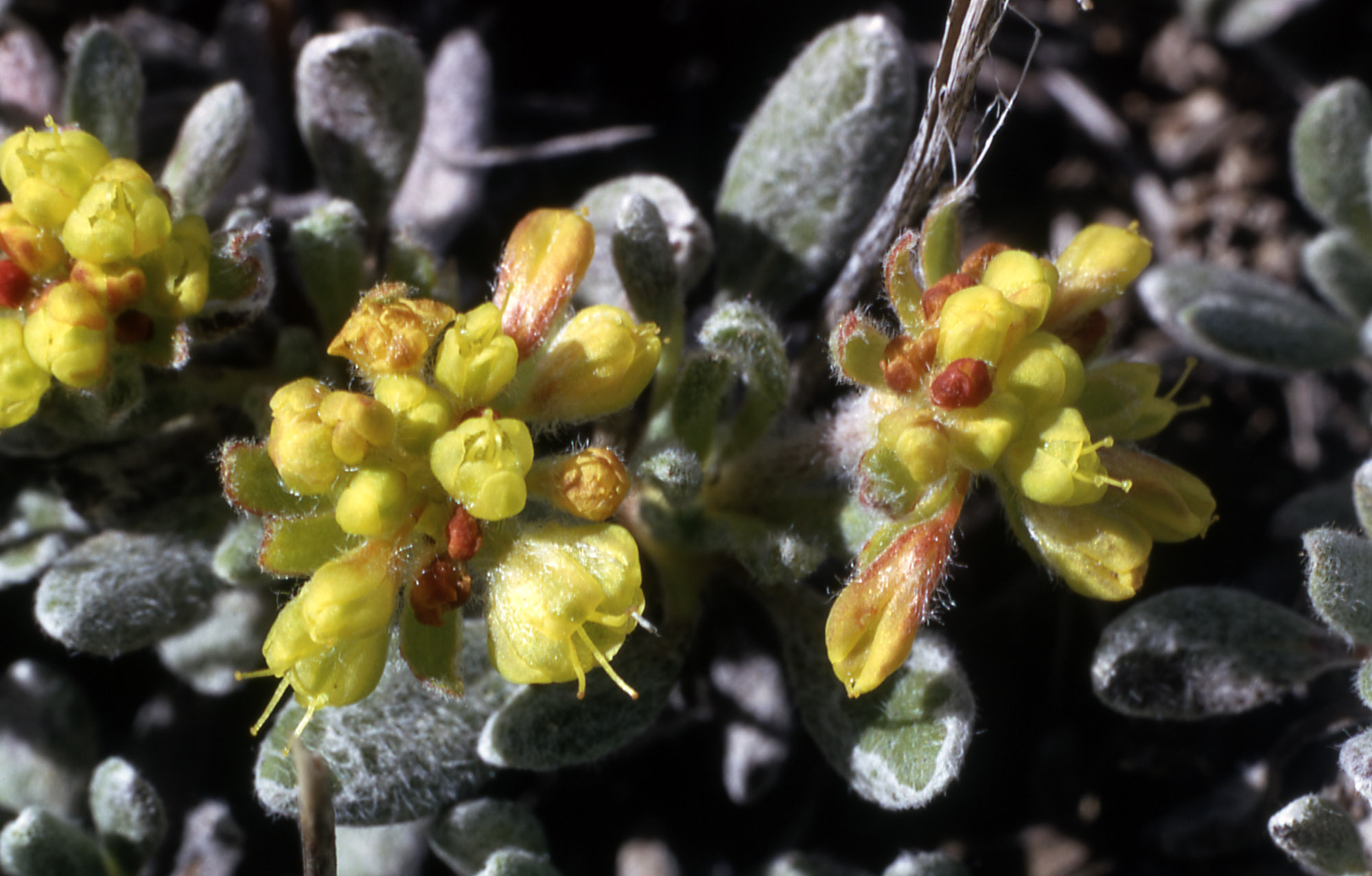

Conservation status
- Secure (NatureServe)

Scientific classification
- Kingdom: Plantae
- Clade: Embryophytes
- Clade: Tracheophytes
- Clade: Angiosperms
- Clade: Eudicots
- Order: Caryophyllales
- Family: Polygonaceae
- Genus: Eriogonum
- Species: E. caespitosum

Binomial name
- Eriogonum caespitosum Nutt.

Synonyms
- Eriogonum andinum; Eriogonum sericoleucum

= Eriogonum caespitosum =

Species of wild buckwheat

Eriogonum caespitosum is a species of wild buckwheat known by the common name matted buckwheat, mat buckwheat, or cushion desert buckwheat.

== Description ==
The species is a tough perennial plant which grows in flat, woody mats in sand and gravel substrates. It has small, fuzzy gray leaves (under 2.5 centimetres (1 in) long) which are scoop-shaped due to their rolled edges.

In early summer, short stalks emerge from the mat with inflorescences of greenish-yellow and whitish rounded clusters of flowers. These redden with age and hang backwards over the edge of the involucre. The species is dioecious. Some of the flowers are bisexual and up to 1 cm wide each, and some are only staminate and much smaller.

== Taxonomy ==
Eriogonum caespitosum was given its scientific name in 1834 by Thomas Nuttall, placing it in the Eriogonum genus. It is part of the Polygonaceae and has no accepted subspecies or varieties, but there are several that are considered botanical synonyms.

Table of Synonyms
Name	Year	Rank	Notes
Eriogonum andinum Nutt.	1848	species	= het.
Eriogonum caespitosum var. alyssoides Gand.	1906	variety	= het.
Eriogonum caespitosum subsp. ramosum (Piper) S.Stokes	1936	subspecies	= het.
Eriogonum caespitosum subsp. typicum S.Stokes	1936	subspecies	≡ hom.
Eriogonum douglasii subsp. ramosum Piper	1906	subspecies	= het.
Eriogonum sericoleucum Greene ex Tidestr.	1923	species	= het.
Eriogonum sphaerocephalum var. sericoleucum (Greene ex Tidestr.) S.Stokes	1936	variety	= het.
Notes: ≡ homotypic synonym; = heterotypic synonym

== Distribution and habitat ==
It is a common perennial plant native to the western United States from California to Montana, especially the Great Basin.

It prefers middle and high elevations, from shrub–steppe to rocky environs.

== Uses ==
It is cultivated as a rock garden plant.
