= Sagebrush steppe =

Grassland ecosystem

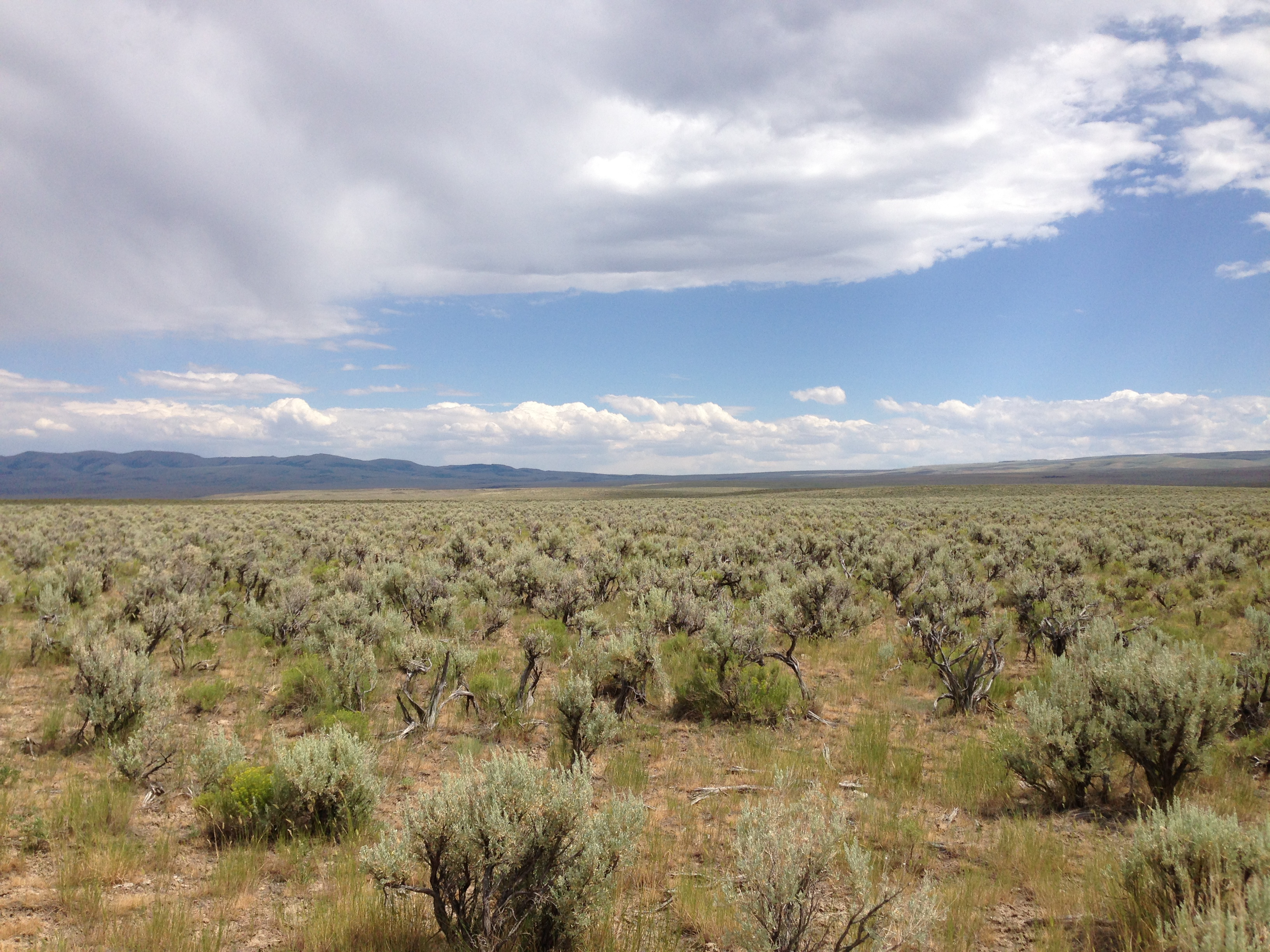
Sagebrush steppe with Artemisia tridentata, of the Great Basin region in Owyhee County, Idaho

Sagebrush steppe, also known as the sagebrush sea, is a type of shrub-steppe, a plant community characterized by the presence of shrubs, and usually dominated by sagebrush, any of several species in the genus Artemisia. This ecosystem is found in the Intermountain West in the United States.

== Species ==
The most common sagebrush species in the sagebrush steppe in most areas is big sagebrush (Artemisia tridentata). Others include three-tip sagebrush (Artemisia tripartita) and low sagebrush (Artemisia arbuscula). Sagebrush is found alongside many species of grasses.

Sagebrush steppe is a diverse habitat, with more than 350 recorded vertebrate species. It is also open rangeland for livestock, a recreation area, and a water source in otherwise arid regions. It is key habitat for declining flora and fauna species, such as greater sage-grouse (Centrocercus urophasianus) and pygmy rabbit (Brachylagus idahoensis).

Sagebrush steppe is a threatened ecosystem in many regions. It was once prevalent in the regions that form the Intermountain West such as the Great Basin and Colorado Plateau. It has become fragmented and degraded by many forces. Steppe has been overgrown with introduced species and has changed to an ecosystem resembling pine and juniper woodland, which has changed the fire regime of the landscape, increasing fuel loads and increasing the chance of unnaturally severe wildfires. Cheatgrass (Bromus tectorum) is also an important introduced plant species that increases fire risk in this ecosystem. Other forces leading to these habitat changes include fire suppression and overgrazing of livestock. Besides severe fire, consequences of the breakdown of sagebrush steppe include increased erosion of the land and sedimentation in local waterways, decreased water quality, decreased quality of forage available for livestock, and degradation of habitat for wildlife and game animals.
