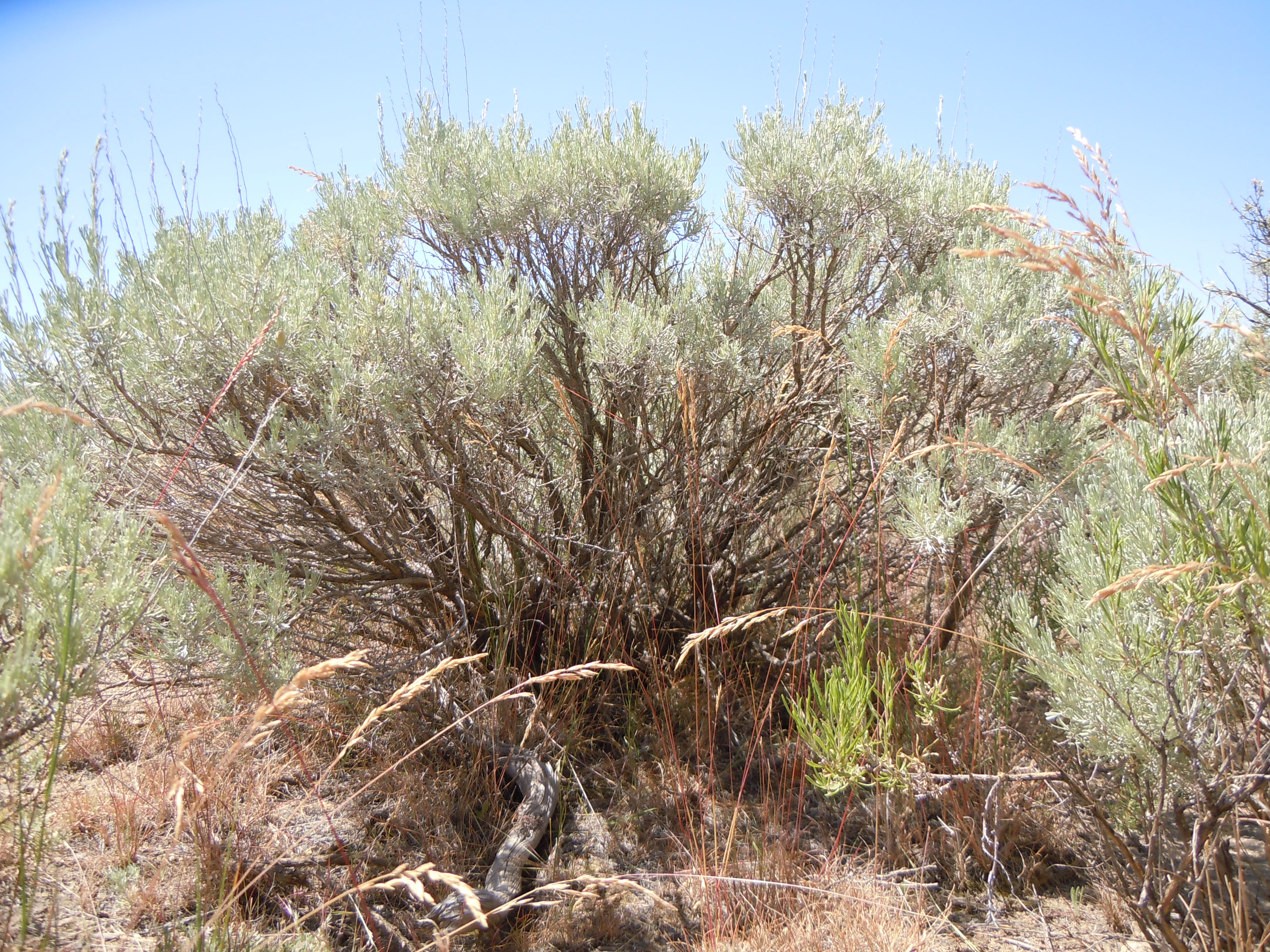

Conservation status
- Secure (NatureServe)

Scientific classification
- Kingdom: Plantae
- Clade: Tracheophytes
- Clade: Angiosperms
- Clade: Eudicots
- Clade: Asterids
- Order: Asterales
- Family: Asteraceae
- Genus: Artemisia
- Species: A. tripartita

Binomial name
- Artemisia tripartita Rydb.

Synonyms
- Artemisia trifida Nutt. 1841 not Turcz. 1832; Seriphidium tripartitum (Rydb.) W.A.Weber

= Artemisia tripartita =

Species of flowering plant

Artemisia tripartita is a species of flowering plant in the aster family known by the common name threetip sagebrush. It is native to western North America from British Columbia to Nevada and Montana to Colorado. It covers about 8.4 million acres (3.4 million hectares) of the Rocky Mountains and Great Basin.

== Ecology ==
This plant is common and can be dominant in some regions, including the steppe of Washington, the sagebrush of southern Idaho, and the grassland and shrubland in western Montana. It tolerates dry soils well.

== Description ==
This plant is an evergreen shrub up to 2 meters tall. The subspecies rupicola (Wyoming threetip sagebrush) is a dwarf subspecies with decumbent branches, spreading to about half a meter but growing only about 15 centimeters tall. The wooly leaves are three-parted. The plant produces many seeds. It can also spread by sprouting from shallow roots and by layering. The plant is aromatic. Where their ranges overlaps, this species can be hard to distinguish from Artemisia rigida which also has deeply divided tripartite leaves. A. tripartita typically has shorter woolly hair on the leaves (long and silky in A. rigida), the leaf parts are usually longer and narrower, and it often grows taller.

Subspecies

- Artemisia tripartita subsp. rupicola Beetle - Wyoming, Colorado
- Artemisia tripartita subsp. tripartita - British Columbia, Washington, Oregon, Idaho, Montana, Wyoming, Utah, Nevada
