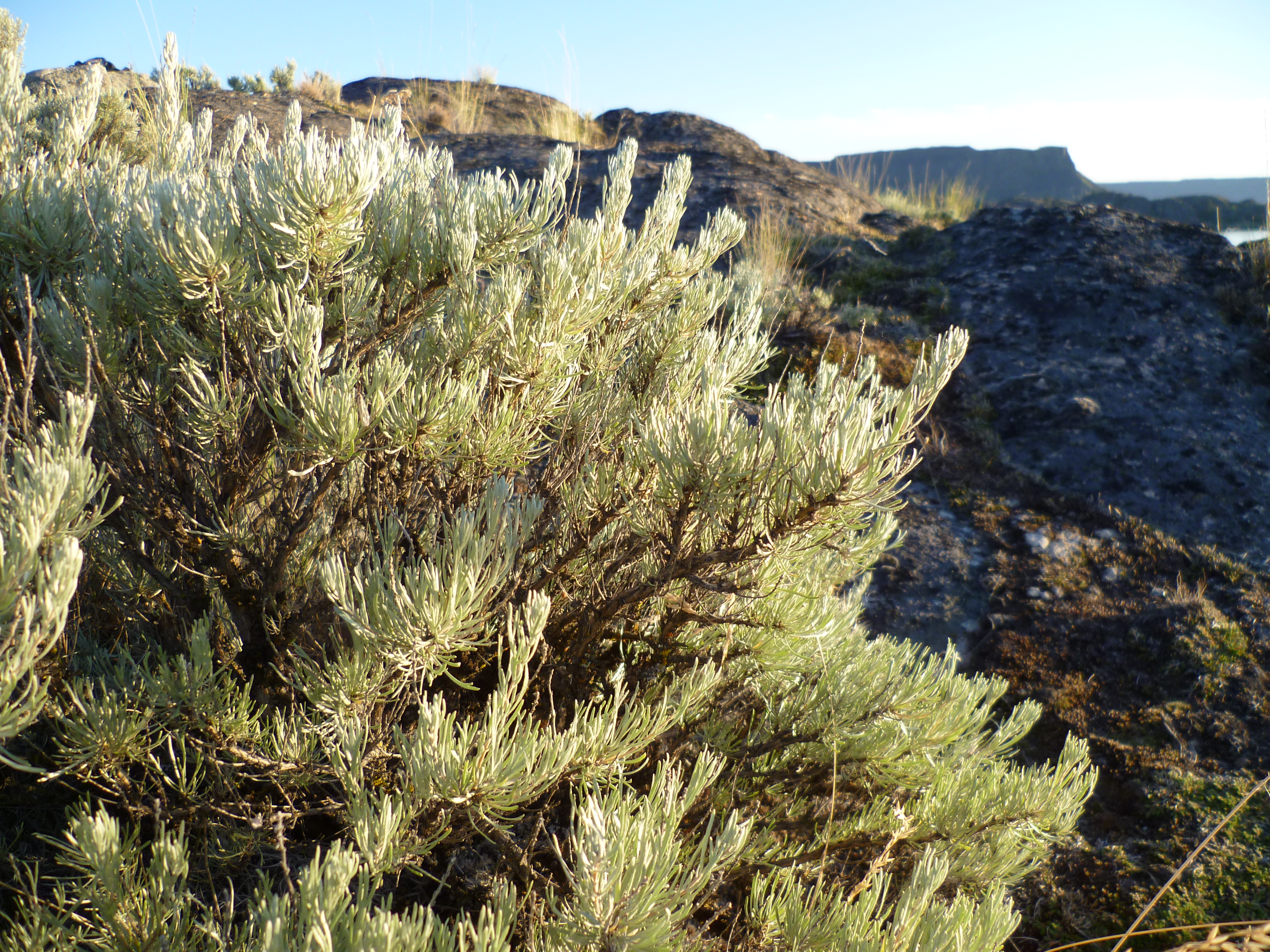
- Artemisia rigida at Banks Lake, Grant County Washington

Conservation status
- Secure (NatureServe)

Scientific classification
- Kingdom: Plantae
- Clade: Tracheophytes
- Clade: Angiosperms
- Clade: Eudicots
- Clade: Asterids
- Order: Asterales
- Family: Asteraceae
- Genus: Artemisia
- Species: A. rigida

Binomial name
- Artemisia rigida (Nutt.) A.Gray

Synonyms
- Artemisia trifida var. rigida Nutt.; Seriphidium rigidum (Nutt.) W.A.Weber

= Artemisia rigida =

Species of flowering plant

Artemisia rigida is a species of flowering plant in the aster family known by the common names scabland sagebrush and stiff sagebrush. It is native to the northwestern United States, in Washington, Idaho, and Oregon. It has been recorded in western Montana but these sightings may have been misidentifications.

== Description ==
Artemisia rigida is a small, spreading, deciduous shrub with many woody branches up to 40 centimeters long. The stems mature to gray and hairy and are often reddish during early growth. The leaves are up to 4 centimeters long and trident-shaped. They are grayish in color from their coat of silvery hairs. The similar Artemisia tripartita leaf typically has shorter woolly hairs. The plant is "mildly" to "pungently" scented. The flower heads are somewhat bell-shaped and measure about half a centimeter wide. They contain 4 to 8 yellow-red to red florets.

== Range and Ecology ==
Artemisia rigida grows in harsh substrates where few other plants survive. The soil is generally very shallow and covers bedrock. The bedrock is always basalt, never granite. The roots of the plant are within the shallow soil layer with some anchoring in rock fractures. There is also sometimes a layer of impermeable clay. The substrate commonly undergoes frost heaving, which breaks it up. On these unproductive sites, which occur in the Channeled Scablands, for example, this plant is a climax species. It is an indicator of scabland habitat. In the Columbia Basin it often dominates regions with thin rocky soils, and has Sandberg's bluegrass as the main understory species along with various low herbaceous plants such as Viola trinervata and small Lomatium species.

Artemisia rigida provides food for wildlife because it is often the only plant exposed as the snow melts in the spring on mostly barren landscapes. Livestock also like it, especially the seedheads.
