= List of pisco brands =

This is a list of pisco/aguardiente brands. Pisco is a colorless spirit produced in winemaking regions of Peru and Aguardiente is a yellowish-to-amber-colored spirit from Chile.

== Chile (Aguardiente, not Pisco) ==
=== Compañía de las Cervecerías Unidas-owned ===
- Espíritu de los Andes
- Horcón Quemado
- La Serena, named after the city of La Serena
- Mistral, named after Gabriela Mistral a Chilean literature nobel laureate native to Elqui Valley
- Pisco Campanario
- Pisco Control
- Ruta Norte
- Tres Erres

=== CAPEL owned ===
- Alto del Carmen, named after the locality of Alto del Carmen
- Pisco Capel, one of Chile's oldest aguardiente brands

=== Prohens ===
- Malpaso

=== Other ===
- Fundo los nichos, oldest aguardiente in chile, originally Tres Erres until the brand was sold to CCU, Pisco Bauza
- Waqar, five generations of aguardiente maker
- El Gobernador - Made from 40% muscatel grapes, this aguardiente is the first spirit to be produced in the Miguel Torres brand.
- Catan Pisco, Made from 100% Pedro Ximénez grapes and double distilled in Chile, this brand is based in the US and serves the rapidly growing US aguardiente market.

== Peru ==
- BARSOL
- Biondi
- Bohórquez
- Broggi
- Cascajal
- Cepas de Loro
- Cortijo del Alto
- Cuatro Gallos
- De Carral
- Del Macho
- Don Alfredo
- Don Benedicto
- Don César
- Don Isidoro
- Don Saturnino
- Don Zacarías
- DonBerly
- E. Copello Puro
- El Alambique
- El Almendral
- El Monitor
- El Sarcay de Azpitia
- El Viejo Parral
- Ferreyros
- Fontana Pisco
- Fundo Real
- Gran Cruz
- GRAN SIERPE
- Grimaldi
- Guacamayo
- La Caravedo
- La Diablada
- Los Nichos
- Lovera
- Miski
- Mongess
- Monteluz
- Montesierpe
- Ocucaje
- Pancho Fierro Acholado
- Payet
- Paz Soldán
- Pisco 100 Perfectly Peruvian
- Pisco Huamaní
- Pisco Portón
- Piscología
- Poblete
- Pozo Santo
- Queirolo
- Rajaz Pisco
- Reinoso
- Rivadeneyra
- Soldeica
- Sotelo
- Tacama Demonio de Los Andes
- Tradición
- Tres Generaciones
- Viejo Porrón
- Viejo Tonel Black
- Viñas de Oro

== Other countries ==
- Don Quixote Distillery - United States
- Harmans Estate, Margaret River, Western Australia
- Leopold Bros. - United States
