= Peruvian Pisco =

Grape brandy produced in Peru

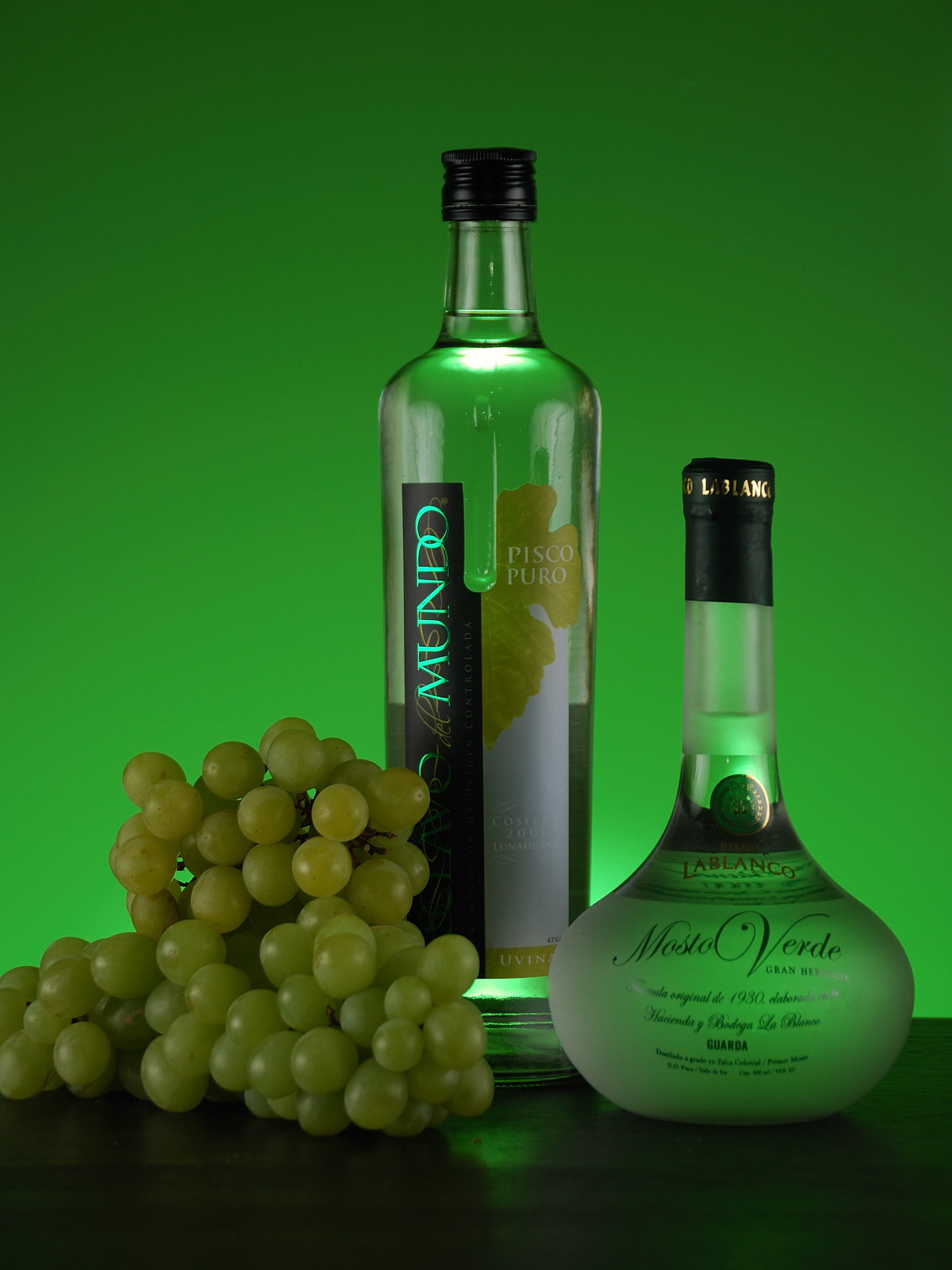
Grapes and Pisco produced in Peru.

In Peru, pisco is a "designation of origin" that is reserved for the alcoholic beverage belonging to a variety of grape aguardiente produced in Peru since the late 16th century. It is the typical distillate of this country, elaborated from fermented wine of certain grapes (Vitis vinifera), whose value has crossed its borders, as evidenced by the records of shipments made through the port of Pisco to Europe and other parts of the Americas since the 17th century, places such as England, Spain, Portugal, Guatemala, Panama and United States, from the mid-19th century.

It is one of the productos bandera del Perú and it is only produced on the coast (up to 2000 meters above sea level) in the departments of Lima, Ica, Arequipa, Moquegua y Tacna.

About the designation of origin pisco, there is a dispute between Chile and Peru. While in the former country the product is simply referred to as "pisco", in the latter the label "Peruvian pisco" is promoted for their variety of pisco as a form of aggressive marketing in their national brands, generally with the support and encouragement of the government as a way of improving their national image.

== Background ==
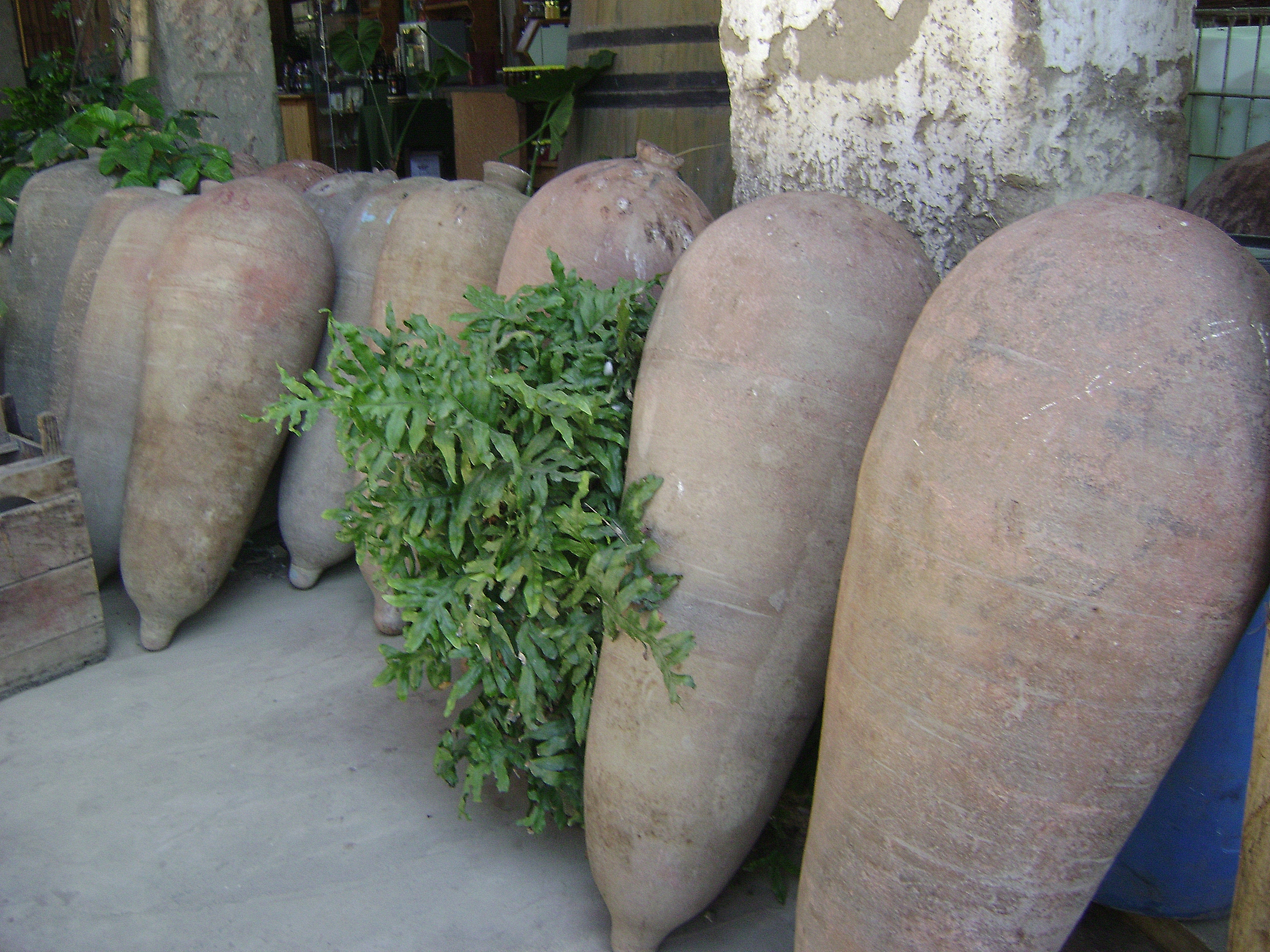
Piskos in the valley of Lunahuaná District.

In Southern Quechua language, spoken largely on the Peru previous to the arrival of the Spanish, the term pisqu (pronounced [pis.qu], also found in the chronicles as pisku, phishgo or pichiu) designates small birds. It is part of the name of the toponymy of various regions of the country, both via Southern Quechua as through other varieties of Quechua, which is often found in the form pishqu and the like.

The Peruvian coast has been characterized for hosting huge populations of birds that feed on the abundant fish, especially in the "Sur Chico". In this area are found corresponding valleys of Pisco, Ica and Grande rivers.

In the valley of Pisco lived a group of people more than two thousand years ago, known for its pottery and, at the time of the Inca Empire, was characterized by its remarkable products potters, called piskos.

Since that time, one of these pottery products were vessels or amphoras, which were used to store beverages of all kinds, including alcoholics. These vessels were called piskos.

Thus, the first grape aguardiente that was produced in Peru was stored in piskos and, over time, this beverage acquired the name of its container.

== Production ==
The elaboration of Peruvian pisco is most dominated by medium-range industry, usually handicraft. This one takes care of the old manufacturing processes and quality, and often does not respond to strictly commercial purposes but a kind of generational pride of Peru. It is a producto bandera del Perú.

== See also ==
- List of piscos
