= Victor Vaughen Morris =

American bar owner

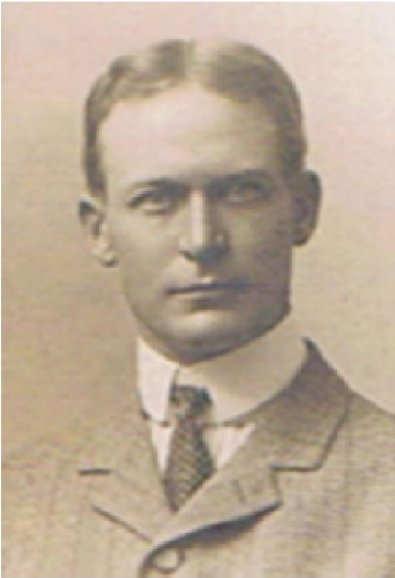
- Morris
- Born: August 5, 1873; Salt Lake City, Utah, USA
- Died: June 11, 1929 (aged 55); Lima, Peru
- Occupation: Bar owner

Victor Vaughen Morris (August 5, 1873 – June 11, 1929) was an American immigrant to Peru and businessman and bar owner best known for inventing the Pisco Sour, the national drink of Peru.

== Origins ==
Morris was born in Salt Lake City, Utah. Descending from a pioneer family, his father was a businessman and a polygamist having served there as a Mormon bishop and his grandfather and great-grandfather had played a prominent role in the founding of the city. He was for several years manager for the B.C. Morris Floral Company but later assumed the direction of the retail stores of Salt Lake Floral Company. He was both popular and energetic and a success as President of the American Florist society. Victor was a leading spirit in Lodge No. 85 of the Elks.

== Morris' Bar, Lima, Peru ==
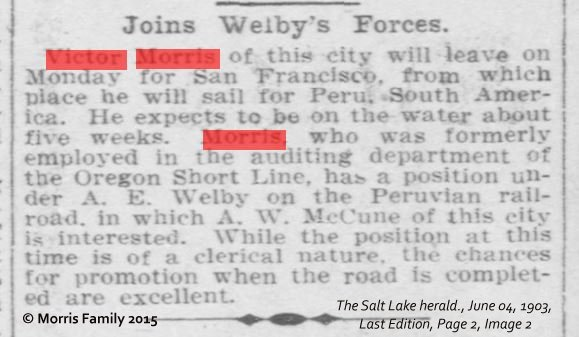
Salt Lake Tribune article on Morris's railroad clerical position to be taken in Peru

In 1903, he traveled to Peru to work as a cashier for the Cerro de Pasco Railway Company. Then, in 1915, he moved to Lima and, on April 1, 1916, founded Morris' Bar.

Located in 847 Calle Boza (close to the Plaza Mayor), Morris' Bar served as a gathering spot for the Peruvian upper class and English-speaking foreigners. According to Peruvian researcher Guillermo Toro-Lira, among the notable individuals who attended Morris' Bar were Elmer Faucett (founder of the Faucett Perú airline), José Lindley (founder of the Corporación José R. Lindley S.A. and Inca Kola), Alfred L. Kroeber (the cultural anthropologist), and Richard Halliburton (an adventurer and cultural ambassador to Peru). The saloon was also a center of drink experimentation for Morris. Nicknamed Gringo, Victor Morris created the Pisco Sour as a variety of the whiskey sour.

=== Visitor Register ===
An M.I.T. mining superintendent, John Tinker Glidden, was "perhaps" the first non-employee and unaffiliated registrant to sign the Morris' Bar Visitor Register. Glidden petitioned for permission "to import 500 Japanese laborers into Peru" in order to supplement (what he deemed as) recalcitrant "natives." Augusto B. Leguía, a xenophobic President against all Japanese immigration, denied the request.

In 1942, when his body was found at the bottom of a mine shaft (only months after organizing, participating, and photographing his eldest daughter's wedding), he worked for the J.P. Morgan & Co.-backed Anglo American plc in the Lucanas Province. His widow, daughters, and their children later immigrated into California and the Pacific Northwest. Glidden's signature, along with handwritten comments, appeared in the Register on Wednesday, October 4, 1922. That date marked almost twenty months since Morris' introduction of the Pisco Sour, or a variant thereof, to Euramerican drinking culture---without Angostura bitters and egg whites, later added by bartender Mario Bruiget. Glidden commented on the bar's libations and services, reflecting that "perfection is made of attention to trifles and yet perfection is no trifle."

== See also ==
- Mixology
- Peruvian cuisine
- Pisco
- Whiskey Sour
