= Borgoña (drink) =

Chilean cocktail

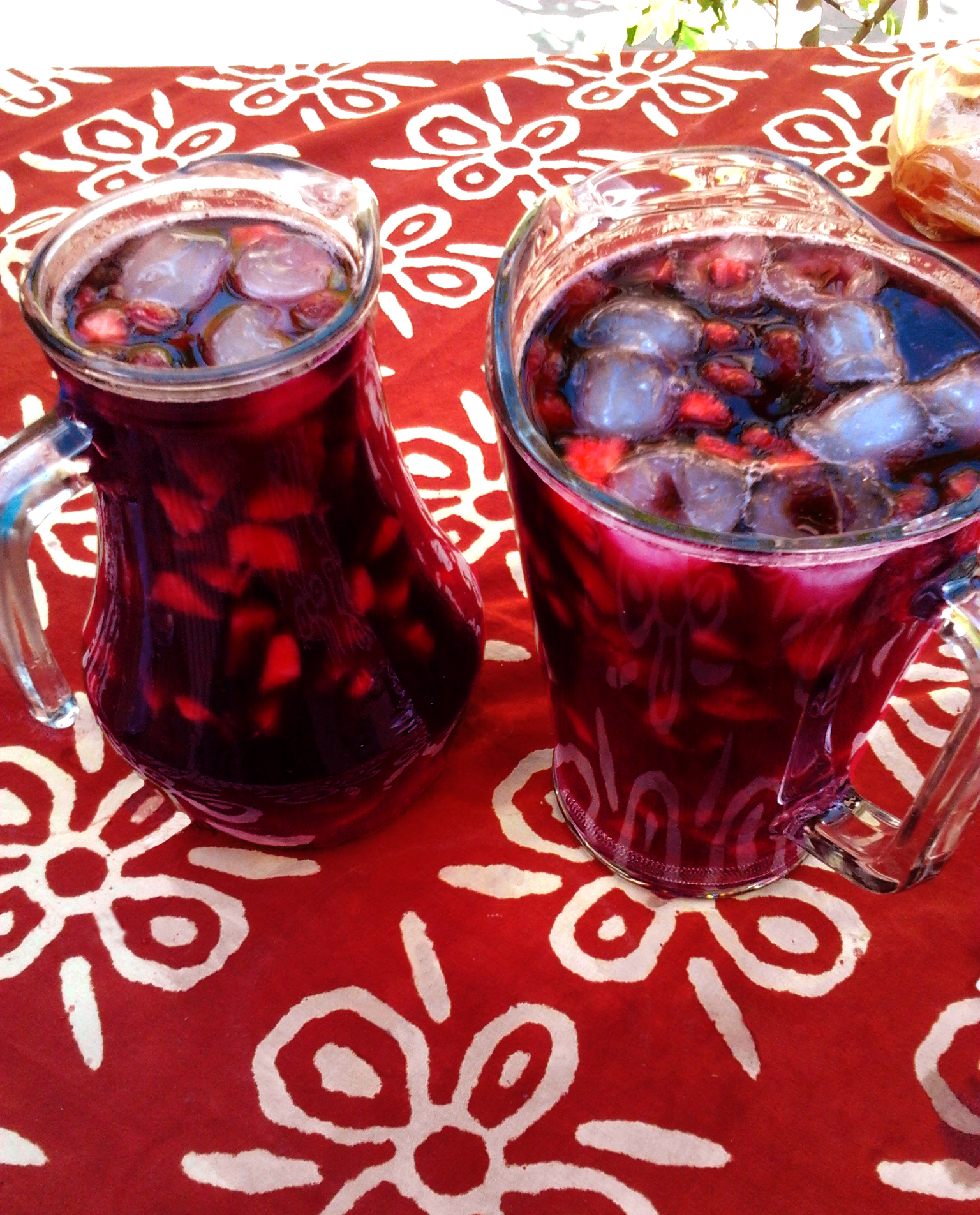
- A pitcher of Borgoña.
- Ingredients: red wine, chopped strawberries, sugar
- Served: in a pitcher

Borgoña (Burgundy) is a traditional Chilean cocktail made with red wine, chopped strawberries, and sugar. It is associated with the country's springtime Fiestas Patrias, as well as with summertime and Christmas.

In 2011, a Chilean nutritionist calculated the number of calories in various traditional Chilean alcoholic beverages and determined that borgoña—at 250 calories per glass—was the fifth most caloric, after pihuelo, paxarette, chupilca, and cola de mono.

== History ==
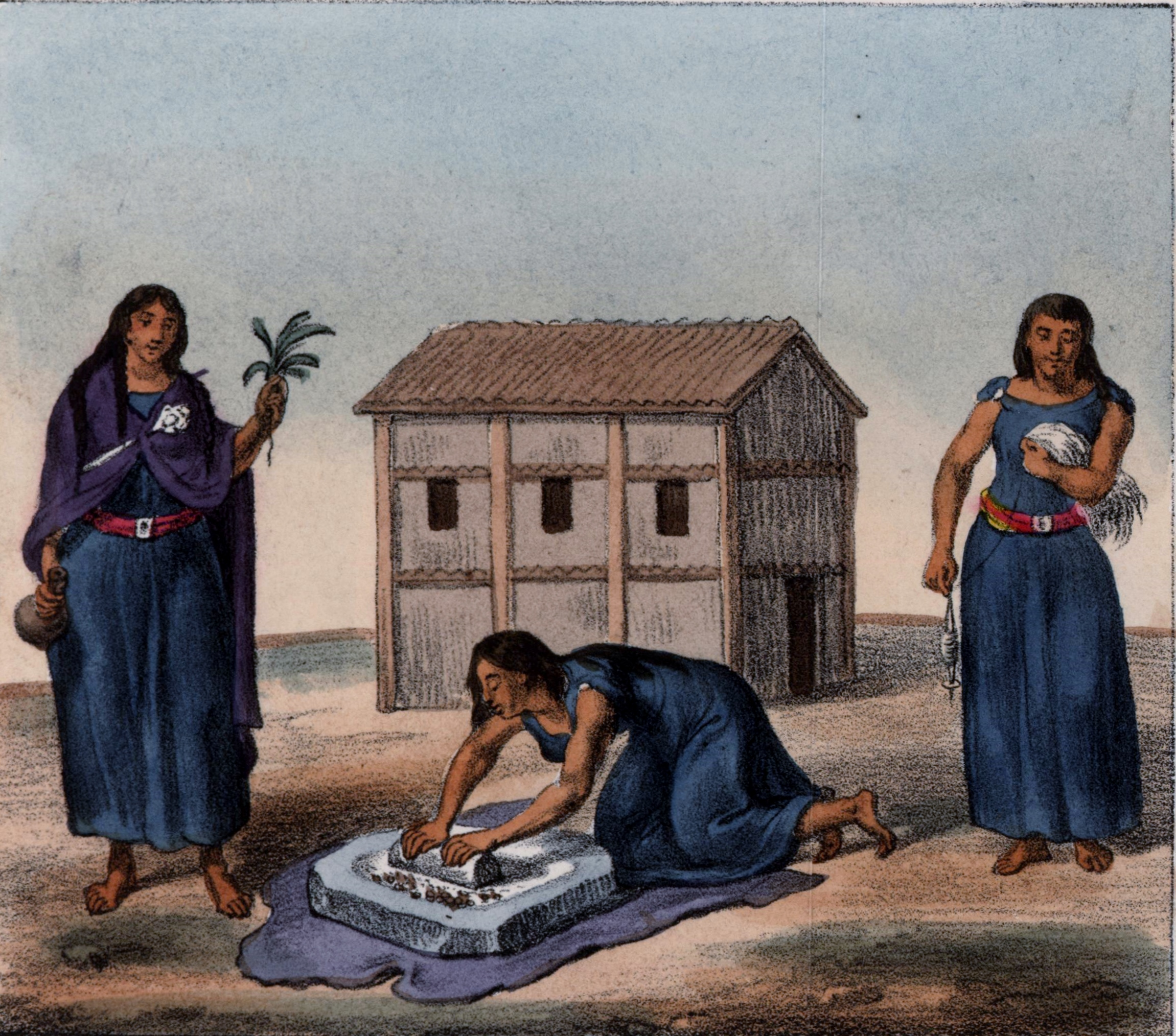
Mapuche women working with agricultural products.

=== Mapuche origins ===
The use of Fragaria chiloensis or the Chilean strawberry to make fermented beverages originates with the Mapuche people, as documented by the first cronistas such as Jerónimo de Vivar, who accompanied Pedro de Valdivia in the conquest of Chile, and who wrote in 1558:

"As for the strawberry that I mentioned in the city of Santiago there is a large amount growing along the ground, from which the Indians make a concoction to drink. It is tasty and has tasted like figs."

In the 17th century, reference is made again to the relationship between Chilean strawberries and alcoholic beverages among the Mapuche, in the writing of the Spanish priest Diego de Ocaña:

"In those fields grow a lot of strawberry plants, which are like madroños, a little more spread out, in small clumps of bushes with roots to the ground. There are other fields of this strawberry that they grow, from which they make a lot of dried fruit and chicha to drink, which sustains them." (1605)

One of the more interesting mentions is in the Spanish captain Francisco Núñez de Pineda y Bascuñán's 1629 work "Cautiverio Feliz":

"After having placed in front of me a pitcher of chicha, they brought me a good-sized plate of fresh strawberries, and without exaggeration there were some that took more than two bites to eat, as we are lucky that they share the bounty of their own vines with us, and they are so careful in cultivating their strawberry bushes, whose fruits they use to make a great quantity of dried fruit for their drinks."

In the mid-18th century, the Chilean historian Vicente Carvallo y Goyeneche in his work Descripción histórico jeografica del Reino de Chile, which went unpublished until 1876, briefly describes the use of the Chilean strawberry and its processing and preparation as a fermented beverage by the Mapuche.

"The Chilean strawberry, which the Indians call Quellghen, and the Spanish frutilla, is abundant in all the fields of Chile, and it exceeds that of Spain in size and quality; there are white, yellow, and red ones, and all of them very sweet and very brightly scented. The Indians dry many of them, and in the winter or the spring they put them to soak in water until they ferment, and the resulting cider is fragrant and good to drink."

For the Mapuche, incorporating Chilean strawberries into alcoholic beverages continued to be a tradition throughout the 20th century, according to the account of Pascual Coña, which mentions that the apple chica produced by the Mapuche could also include maqui, huingán, or strawberries, among other fruits.

The use of strawberries in alcoholic beverages, and particularly wine, probably originated in the border regions, where there were already vineyards planted in the 17th century. But the Society of Jesus played an important role in expanding vineyards in the area.

=== Introduction of the name Borgoña ===
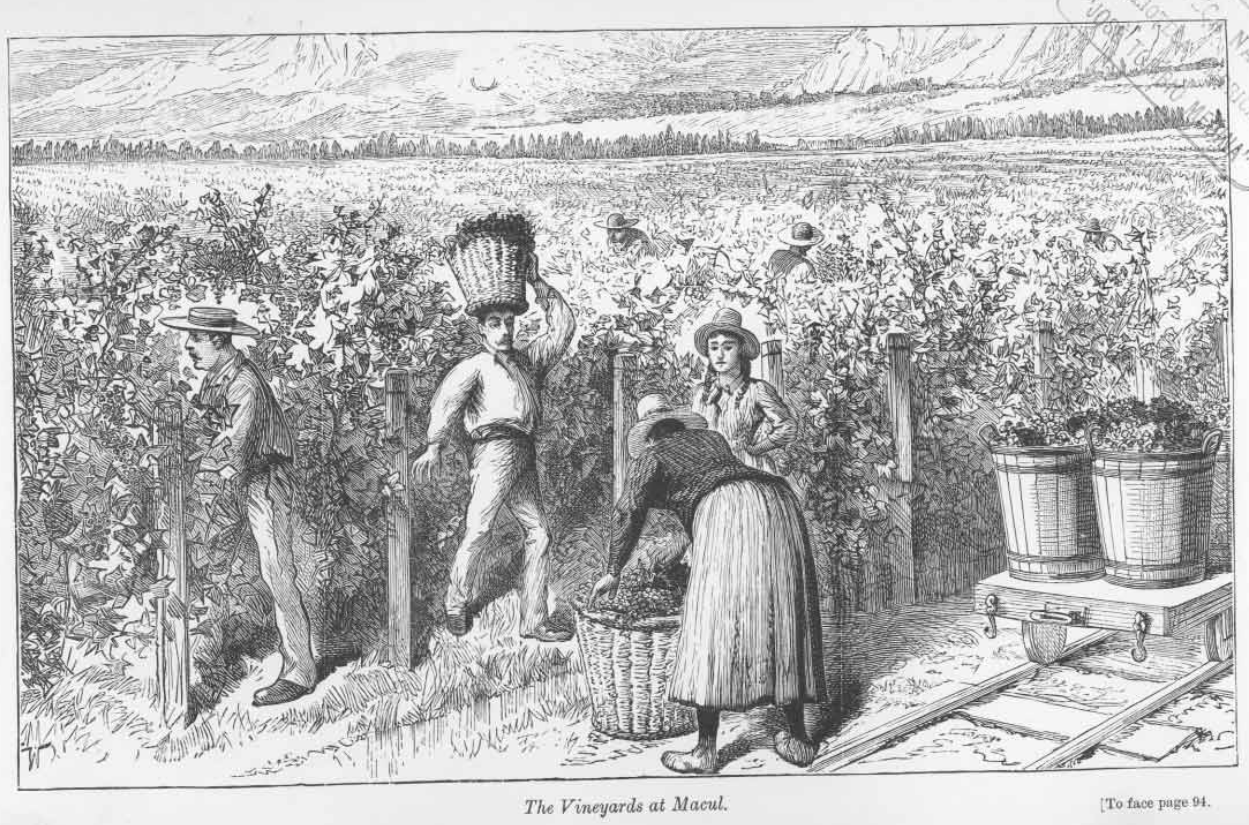
A Chilean vineyard in the late 1800s.

In the mid-19th century, European technocrats started a trend of overvaluation of French wine varieties and of imitation wines that sought to copy French ones and were labeled "Burdeos," "Borgoña," and "Champagne," among others. Additionally, this trend was accompanied by a contempt for the varieties of local criolla grapes that were grown at the time, such as the uva país, moscatel de Alejandría, moscatel amarillo (Torrontés), and moscatel de Austria. Soon the term Borgoña started to be used in a generalized way by winemakers, farmers, and vineyard owners.

This was so prevalent that in 1841 the French naturalist Claudio Gay, during a visit to the Mariscal Vineyard owned by Manuel Antonio Tocornal, noted the presence of multiple varieties of plants of French origin, adding up to more than 100,000 plants:

"The red and white cabernet sauvignon of Bordeaux, the black Malbec, the red and white pinot of Burgundy, and the whitish-rose pinot, a variety ... whose wine is excellent, the Gamay, the Chasselas de Fontainbleau for the table and the red Chasselas that is better preserved."

Gay also noted in the city of Valparaíso the existence of imitations of foreign wines sold by some merchants who added other ingredients to replicate the flavor of the originals:

"In that same city of Valparaíso there are those who imitate foreign wines by mixing various species from this country and adding alcohol, sugar, and other substances such as nuts, almond shells, bearded iris, etc. In this way they make Port, Malaga, Madeira, and other wines. Which they sell very easily."

In the mid-19th century, wines were advertised with little clarity about the grape variety. While earlier the consumer was warned that a wine was "Bordeaux-style," "sherry-style," "Burgundy-style," eventually they became directly labeled as "Bordeaux," "Sherry," or "Burgundy." In this period the word Borgoña (Burgundy) became popular to denote types or varieties of French wines.

== See also ==
- Piscola
- Serena libre
- Cola de mono
- Mate con malicia
- Terremoto (beverage)
