= Don Alfredo =

Don Alfredo may refer to:

- Don Alfredo, a brand of cigars produced by Dunhill
- Don Alfredo (cocktail), a cocktail of modern Peruvian cuisine
