= Piscoffee =

Combination of coffee and pisco

The Piscoffee is a preparation based in coffee and pisco which has two variations, a cold and a hot one.

Iced piscoffee is very similar to piscola, three ice cubes, Pisco and iced coffee or iced tea if preferred. Hot piscoffee is very similar to Irish coffee is prepared by adding cream and pisco to a cup of coffee.

This preparation appears in recent times among law students, apparently at the Pontifical Catholic University of Chile. It has become popular among many students of that discipline at all universities in Chile, due to the widespread practice of those enrolled to study at night to stay awake while studying.
