= Mistral (pisco) =

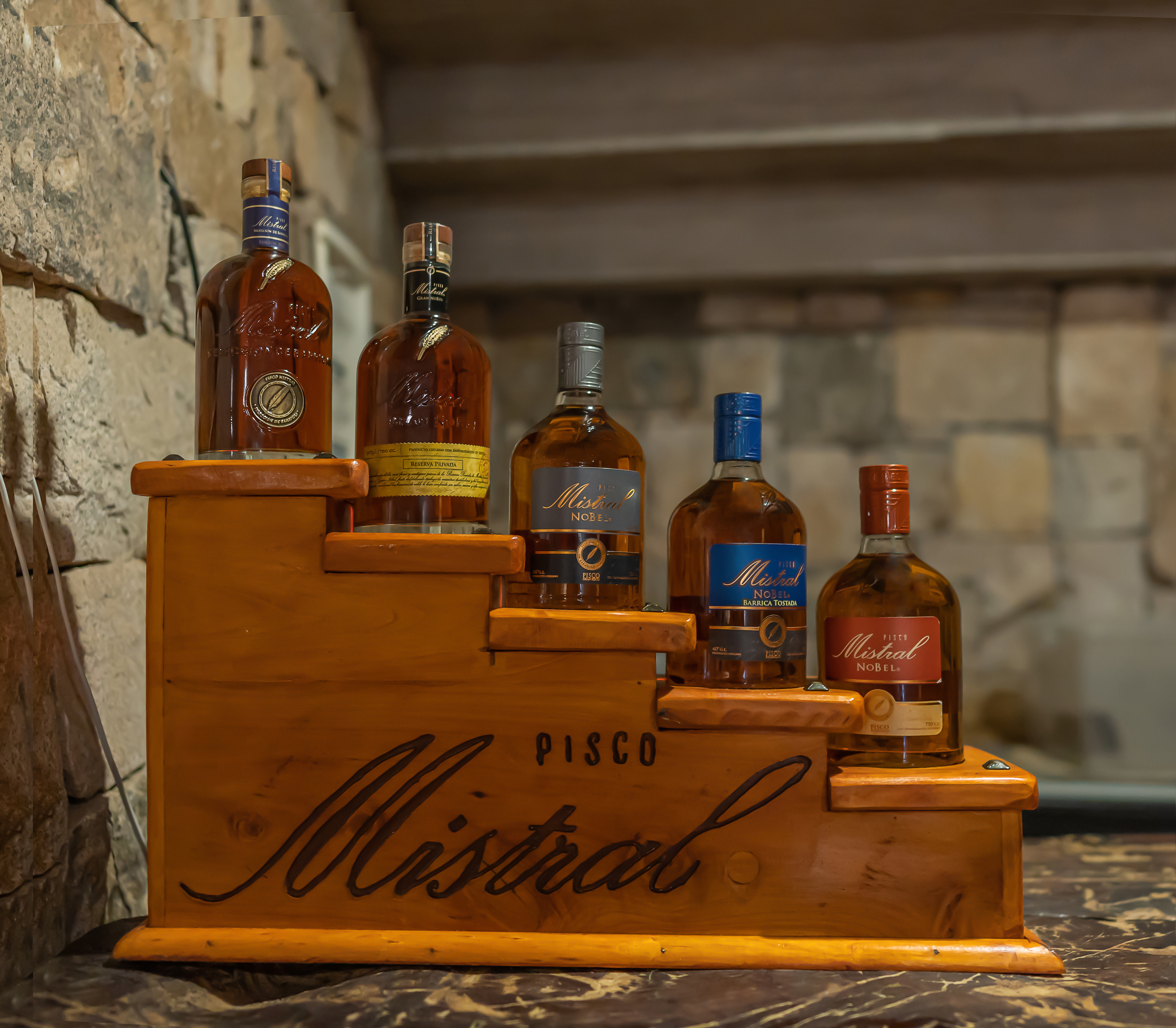
Bottles of different varieties of theChilean pisco Mistral.

Mistral is a brand of Chilean pisco owned by Compañía de Cervecerías Unidas (CCU). The brand takes its name from the Chilean nobel literature laureate Gabriela Mistral who was a native from Elqui Valley where pisco grapes are grown.
