= Amargo Chuncho =

Peruvian bitters product

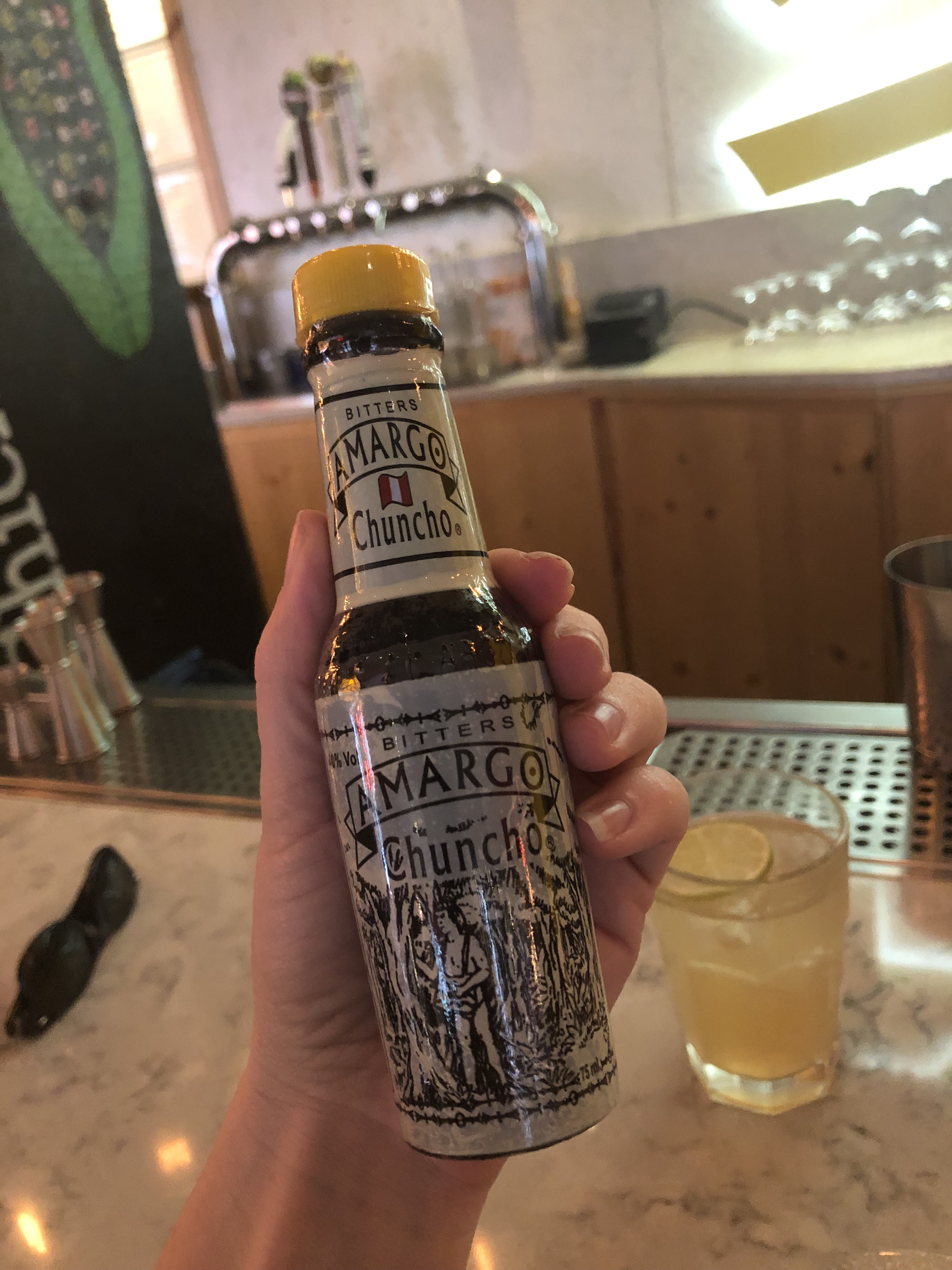
- Amargo Chuncho bitters
- Type: Bitters
- Country of origin: Lima, Peru
- Alcohol by volume: 40%
- Website: Official website

Amargo Chuncho or Chuncho Bitters is a bitters product from Peru traditionally used to make a Pisco Sour.

Made in Lima, Peru, Amargo Chuncho bitters are aged for six months in barrels. The bitters comprise cinnamon, allspice, nutmeg, floral notes, cherry and cola.
