= New York sour =

Cocktail

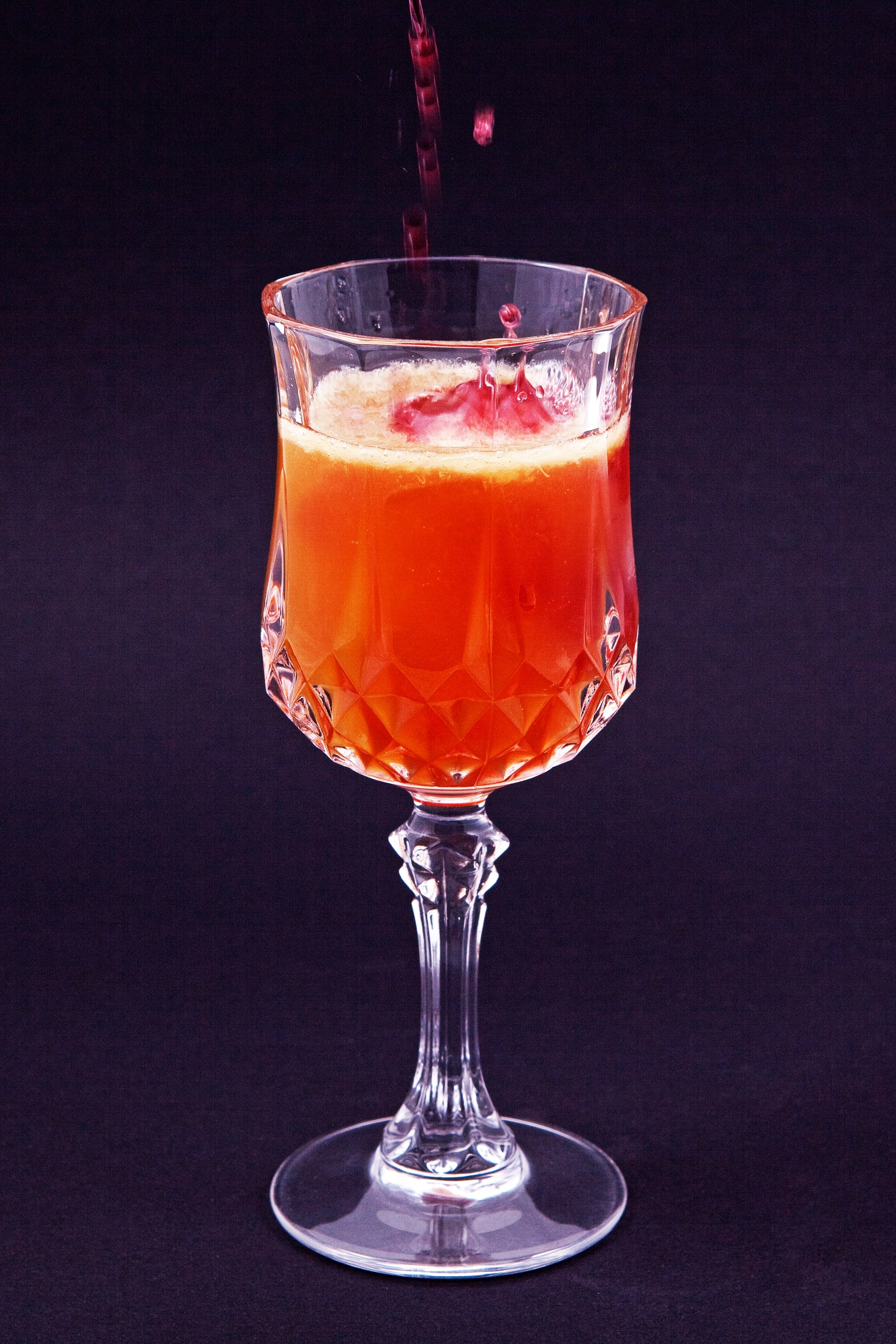
- Type: Cocktail
- Ingredients: 6 cl whiskey (rye or bourbon); 2.25 cl Simple syrup; 3 cl fresh lemon juice; Few drops of egg white; 1.5 cl red wine (Shiraz or Malbec)
- Base spirit: Whiskey
- Standard drinkware: Old fashioned glass
- Standard garnish: Lemon or orange zest and cherry
- Served: On the rocks: poured over ice
- Preparation: Pour the whiskey, syrup, lemon juice, and egg white into shaker with ice cubes. Shake vigorously. Strain into chilled rocks glass filled with ice. Float the wine on top. Garnish with lemon or orange zest and cherry.

The New York sour is an IBA official cocktail. Largely similar to the whiskey sour, the New York sour adds a float of dry red wine to the drink.

== See also ==
- List of cocktails
