= Monteluz (pisco) =

Peruvian pisco distillery

Monteluz is a Peruvian pisco distillery producing limited amounts of multivarietal pisco using the Mosto Verde technique, which consists of distilling young wines before all the sugars in them are fully converted into alcohol. Due to the small quantities produced and high prices commanded, as well as its dedicated group of enthusiasts in the Peruvian gastronomic sector, Monteluz is often considered a "cult pisco" and is promoted as such by the country's diplomatic envoys abroad.

== Production ==
Unlike other grape brandies, pisco is distilled only once. It is also distilled from wine, rather than grape pomace, and is not aged in barrels. It thus retains many of the fresh flavours and aromas that were found in the young wine, in the form of small and highly volatile molecules called aldehydes and esters.

To capture these molecules and ensure they are retained in the distillate, Monteluz use similar methods to traditional perfume manufacturers such as Fragonard and Galimard in Grasse, France. Like the jasmine pickers of Grasse, for example, they are known to pick their grapes at night when temperatures are much lower, and to stack the grapes on shelves inside their trucks, to avoid the grapes at the top squashing the ones at the bottom during transportation (contact between the yeast on the skins and the sugars inside grapes is what triggers fermentation). Also, like a perfume essence, Monteluz's pisco is bottled in a dark bottle to avoid its fragrant chemicals being altered by sunlight.
