= Don Alfredo (cocktail) =

Sparkling wine cocktail from Peruvian cuisine

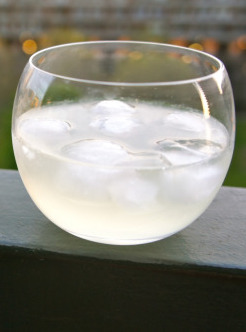
- Don Alfredo Cocktail
- Type: Cocktail
- Ingredients: 4.5cl Pisco; 3cl St-Germain; 2cl Lime juice; Splash Club soda
- Base spirit: Pisco
- Standard drinkware: Old fashioned glass
- Served: on ice
- Preparation: In an old-fashioned glass filled with ice, pour in Pisco, elderflower liqueur (such as St-Germain) and lime juice. Stir and top with club soda.

Don Alfredo is a popular cocktail of modern Peruvian cuisine. The drink is prepared by mixing Peruvian mosto verde pisco, elderflower infused liquor such as St-Germain and lime juice in a cocktail glass filled with ice. The glass is then topped off with sparkling mineral water. It is usually served over ice in a lowball glass (or sometimes a martini glass or wine glass) and garnished with a spring of mint leaf, basil or a lime peel. Other variants include the Don Alfredo Spritz, which adds champagne or cava to the mix, and a plethora of modified versions.

== History of pisco ==
Pisco is a late 16th-century brandy made from grapes that originated in the Viceroyalty of Peru. It was available in San Francisco since the 1830s when it was first brought from Pisco, Peru via ship by rawhide and tallow traders trading with California towns. During the California Gold Rush of 1849 the brandy was readily available in San Francisco.

There are eight approved grape varietals, four considered to be non-aromatic: Quebranta, Negra Criolla, Uvina, and Mollar, while the aromatics are Moscatel, Torontel, Italia and Albilla. They grow in one of five growing regions in 42 different valleys. Pisco was the first distilled spirit made in the new world. As there were no glass bottles in the 16th century, the brandy was shipped in ceramic (clay) containers sealed with beeswax.

== History of the cocktail ==
The drink originated in Lima, Perú in 2008; the cocktail gained popularity by the end of 2012, and is now enjoyed in most countries Peruvian pisco and elderflower liquor are available.

== The recipe ==
In a cocktail glass filled with ice, pour in 45ml Pisco, 30ml elderflower liqueur (such as St Germain) and 20ml lime juice.

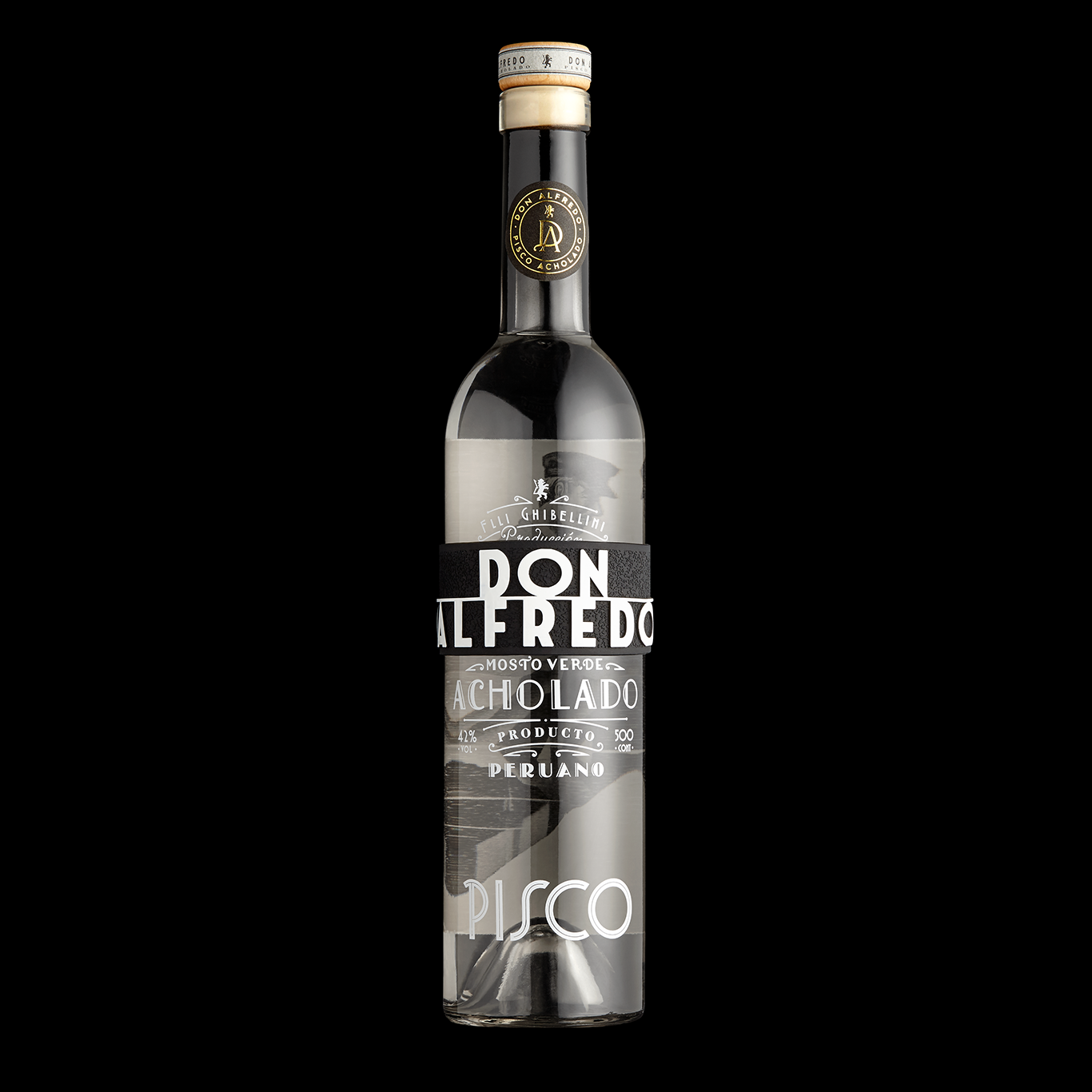

== Don Alfredo pisco ==
The cocktail should not be confused with the brand of pisco. Although it can be made with any mosto verde pisco, the cocktail was made popular using the Don Alfredo pisco.

== See also ==
Drink topics

- List of cocktails
  - List of cocktails with less common spirits
- List of piscos
- Pisco
- Pisco Sour
- Punch (drink)

Regional topics

- Peruvian cuisine and drinks
