= Pisco punch =

Alcoholic beverage

Pisco Punch
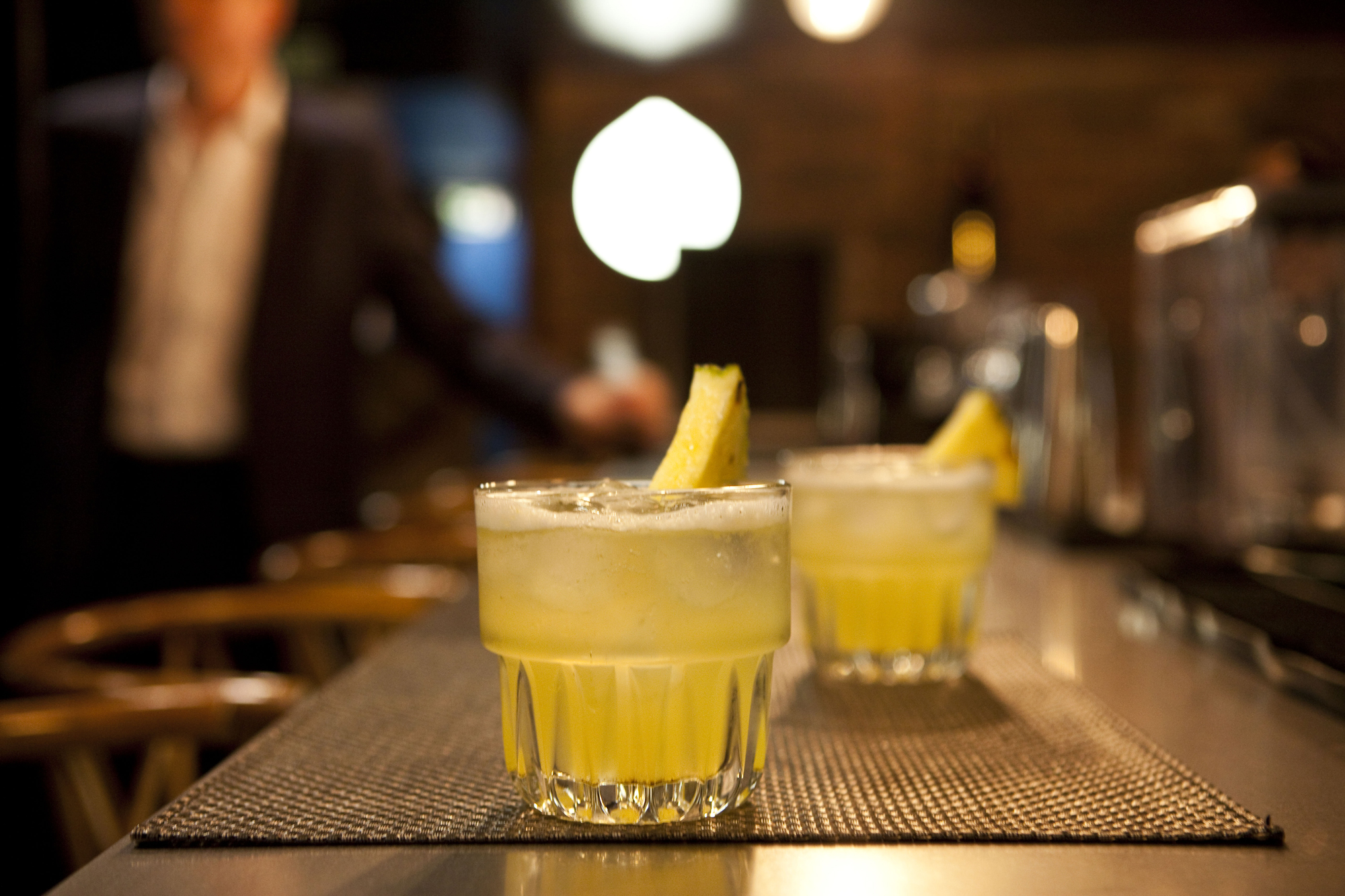
- Type: Mixed drink
- Ingredients: pisco brandy, pineapple, lime juice, sugar, gum arabic and distilled water
- Base spirit: Pisco
- Standard drinkware: Cocktail glass
- Standard garnish: Cherry and pineapple
- Served: On the rocks: poured over ice

Pisco punch is an alcoholic beverage made famous by Duncan Nicol at the Bank Exchange Saloon at the end of the 19th century, in San Francisco, California. The Bank Exchange Saloon was located on the southeast corner of the intersection of Montgomery and Washington Streets, in the Montgomery Block building, where the Transamerica Pyramid now stands.

== History of Pisco ==
Pisco is a late 16th-century brandy made from grapes that are originally from Peru. It was available in San Francisco since the 1830s when it was first brought from Paita, Peru via ship by rawhide and tallow traders trading with California towns. During the California Gold Rush of 1849, brandy was readily available in San Francisco.

There are eight approved grape varietals, four considered to be non-aromatic: Quebranta, Negra Criolla, Uvina, and Mollar, while the aromatics are Moscatel, Torontel, Italia, and Albilla. They grow in one of five growing regions in 42 different valleys. Pisco was the first distilled spirit made in the new world. As there were no glass bottles in the 16th century, the brandy was shipped in ceramic (clay) containers sealed with beeswax.

"In 1839, early in the year, the brig, Daniel O'Connell, an English vessel, arrived at Yerba Buena from Payta [sic], Peru, with a cargo of Peruvian and other foreign goods, having on board a considerable quantity of pisco or Italia, a fine delicate liquor manufactured at a place called Pisco.

== History of the drink ==
When the Bank Exchange & Billiard Saloon opened its doors in 1853 it served pisco among several other liquors. Several punches were made using pisco at the Bank Exchange over a long succession of owners, ending in 1893 with Duncan Nicol. Nicol was the last owner of the Bank Exchange when it closed its doors permanently in 1919 because of the Volstead Act.

Duncan Nicol invented the pisco punch recipe using pisco brandy, pineapple, lime juice, sugar, gum arabic and distilled water. The punch was so potent that one writer of the day wrote "it tastes like lemonade but comes back with the kick of a roped steer." Others said, "it makes a gnat fight an elephant." Harold Ross, founder of The New Yorker magazine wrote in 1937: "In the old days in San Francisco there was a famous drink called Pisco Punch, made from Pisco, a Peruvian brandy... pisco punch used to taste like lemonade but had a kick like vodka, or worse."

Pisco Punch gained fame worldwide thanks to pieces written by travelers including Mark Twain and Harold Ross (founder of New Yorker magazine). In Rudyard Kipling's 1899 epic From Sea to Sea, he immortalized pisco punch as being "compounded of the shavings of cherub's wings, the glory of a tropical dawn, the red clouds of sunset and the fragments of lost epics by dead masters." Unfortunately, prohibition closed the doors of the Bank Exchange, and Duncan Nicol died soon thereafter—supposedly taking the exact recipe to his grave. Variations of the drink are still prepared in San Francisco.

== See also ==
Drink topics

- List of cocktails with less common spirits
- Pisco
- Pisco sour
- Punch (drink)

Regional topics

- Peruvian cuisine and drinks
