= Serena libre =

Alcoholic cocktail made of pisco and papaya juice

- Type: Highball
- Ingredients: 3 parts papaya juice; 1 part pisco; Powdered sugar
- Preparation: Mix over ice

Serena libre is an alcoholic cocktail made of pisco and papaya juice that was created during the 1990s in the bars of La Serena, Chile. It mixes the juice of a papaya and pisco, typical products of the Coquimbo Region.
