= Queirolo =

Queirolo is a surname. Notable people with the surname include:

- Elisa Queirolo (born 1991), Italian water polo player
- Fabio Queirolo (1861-1901), Paraguayan journalist and diplomat
- Francesco Queirolo (1704–1762), Italian Genoese-born sculptor
- José Martínez Queirolo (1931–2008), Ecuadorian playwright and narrator
- Santiago Queirolo, Peruvian pisco producer
