= 2009 Chile–Peru espionage scandal =

The 2009 Chile–Peru espionage scandal was a diplomatic crisis that occurred when a Peruvian court ordered the arrest of two Chilean military officers over allegedly bribing Peruvian air force officer Ariza Mendoza. The charges against the Peruvian air force officer were: revealing national secrets, espionage and money-laundering. Mendoza was purportedly receiving between $5,000 and $8,000 per month in return for reporting national secrets to Chile.

Peruvian President Alan Garcia left Singapore just before the Asia-Pacific Economic Cooperation summit in order to return home to deal with the crisis.

The American ambassador in Lima, P. Michael McKinley, wrote in a leaked cable that the "Peruvian reaction seems exaggerated given the relatively limited scale of the espionage, and suggests political opportunism along with an instinctive reaction to any problem involving Chile." Ambassador McKinley further stated that the timing of the scandal was unfortunate because Peru had "begun to more seriously focus on defeating Shining Path narco-terrorists in the Apurimac-Ene River Valley".
