= Whiskey sour =

Mixed drink containing whiskey

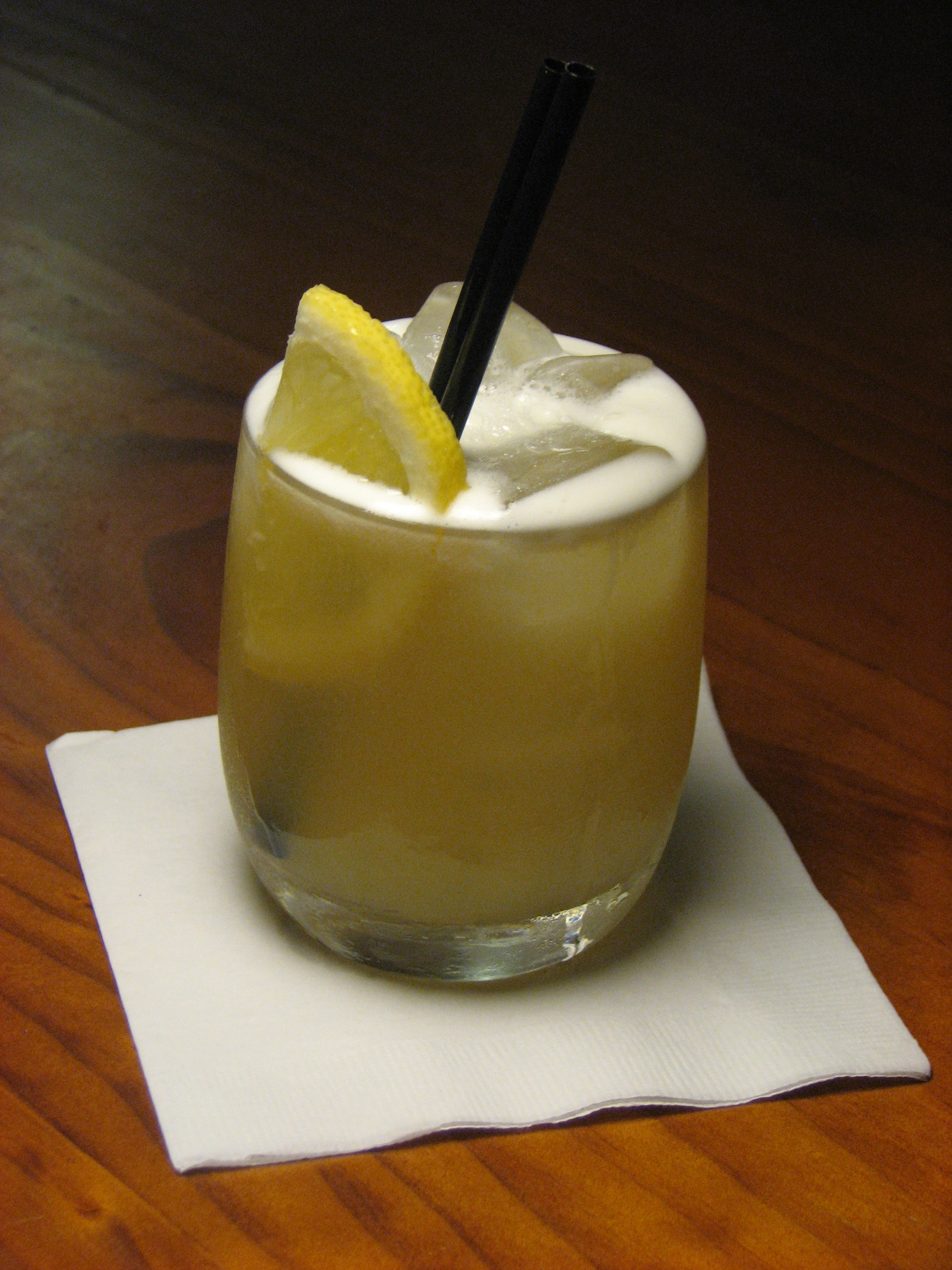
- A whiskey sour with ice cubes and a lemon slice
- Type: Cocktail
- Ingredients: 4.5 cl (3 parts) bourbon whiskey; 3 cl (2 parts) fresh lemon juice; 1.5 cl (1 part) simple syrup
- Base spirit: Whiskey
- Standard drinkware: Old fashioned glass
- Standard garnish: Maraschino cherry and half orange slice
- Served: On the rocks or straight up
- Preparation: Shake with ice. Strain into chilled glass, garnish and serve.

A Whiskey Sour is a mixed drink or shot containing whiskey, lemon juice, and simple syrup, and traditionally garnished with a cherry or sometimes a lemon wedge. It is a blend of sour, bitter, and sweet flavors.

Sometimes, an egg white is included, which is sometimes called a Boston sour. When the whisky used is a Scotch, it is called a Scotch sour. When the whisky used is a Bourbon, it is called a Bourbon sour. With a few bar spoons of full-bodied red wine floated on top, it is usually referred to as a New York sour. It is shaken and served either straight up or over ice.

The International Bartenders Association recipe includes a garnish of half an orange slice and a maraschino cherry.

A variant of the whiskey sour is the Ward 8, which often is based on bourbon or rye whiskey, and includes both lemon juice and orange juice, and grenadine syrup as the sweetener. The egg white sometimes employed in other whiskey sours is not usually included.

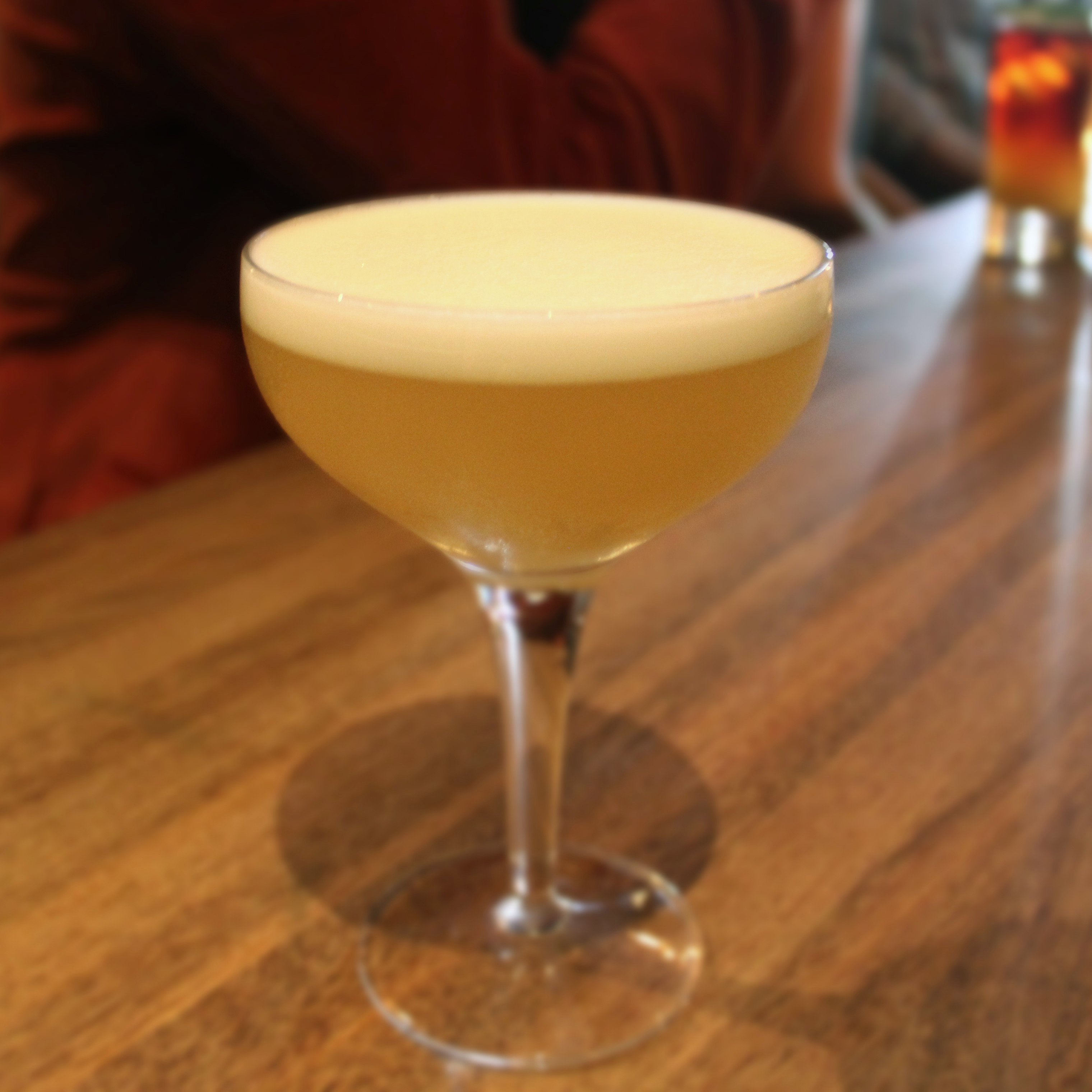
A whiskey sour shaken and served up in a coupe glass

== History ==
The oldest historical mention of a whiskey sour was published in the Wisconsin newspaper Waukesha Plain Dealer, in 1870.

In 1962, the Universidad del Cuyo published a story, citing the Peruvian newspaper El Comercio de Iquique, which indicated that Elliott Stubb created the "whisky sour" in Iquique in 1872, using Limón de Pica for the citrus.
