= Italia (grape) =

Variety of grape

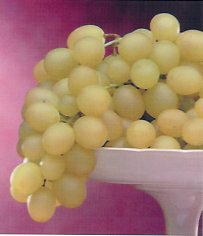
Italia Grape

Italia is a fairly popular Italian seeded white table grape variety.

It was bred by Luigi and Alberto Pirovano in Vaprio d'Adda by crossing Bican and Muscat Hamburg in 1911.

It is also a grape variety that is used in the production of Peruvian Pisco. It is classified as one of the 4 aromatic varieties. It is reported to have been the first grape variety used in the production of the Pisco Punch at the Bank Exchange in 1878.
