= Rivadeneira =

Rivadeneira, Rivadeneyra, Ribadeneira is a surname of Galician origin, meaning "shore of the river Neira". Notable people with the surname include:

- Adolfo Rivadeneyra (1841–1882), Spanish diplomat, orientalist, editor and traveler
- Gabriela Rivadeneira (born 1983), Ecuadorian politician
- Oscar Rivadeneira (born 1960), Peruvian boxer
- Patricia Rivadeneira (born 1964), Chilean actress and cultural manager
- Pedro de Ribadeneira (1527–1611), Spanish hagiographer
- Ricardo Rivadeneira (1929–2011), Chilean politician

== See also ==
- Rivadeneyra Shoal
- Alfredo Rivadeneyra Hernández
