= Limón de Pica =

Unusually acidic lime (citrus) from South America

Limón de Pica is an unusually acidic lime from the oasis town of Pica in Atacama Desert. The Limones de Pica have had an appellation of origin since 2010. The environment where the limes are grown has a mild microclimate that does not display the typical high temperature oscillations seen in many of the world's deserts. Six producers, compromising 20% of the agricultural output of the oasis, are organised in Oasis Pica Coop. As of 2019, the coop was working to certify its products as organic and enforce the appellation control of limón de Pica.

The original version of the whisky sour invented by Elliott Stubb in Iquique in 1872 is made with limón de Pica.
