= Piscola =

Cocktail of pisco and cola drink

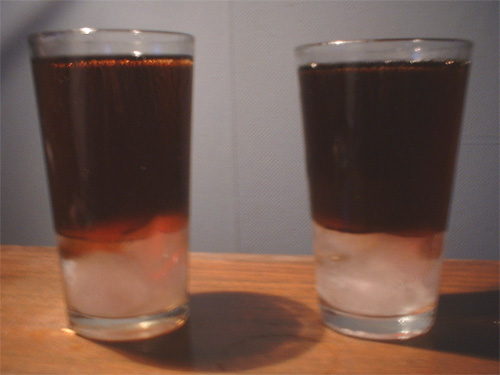
Two piscolas with ice

Piscola or Combinado Nacional (national mix) is a highball cocktail, made of pisco and most commonly a cola drink, that is popular in Chile. A piscola may be black or white depending if it is mixed with a cola or ginger ale, tonic, Sprite or a similar soft drink. The drink is prepared by filling a highball glass with ice and then adding pisco followed by the soft drink in a proportion ranging from 1:1 to 1:3. Sometimes slices of lemon or key lime may be added. In Chile, February 8 has been celebrated as the "day of the piscola" since 2003.
