= Pisco =

Grape spirit made in Peru and Chile

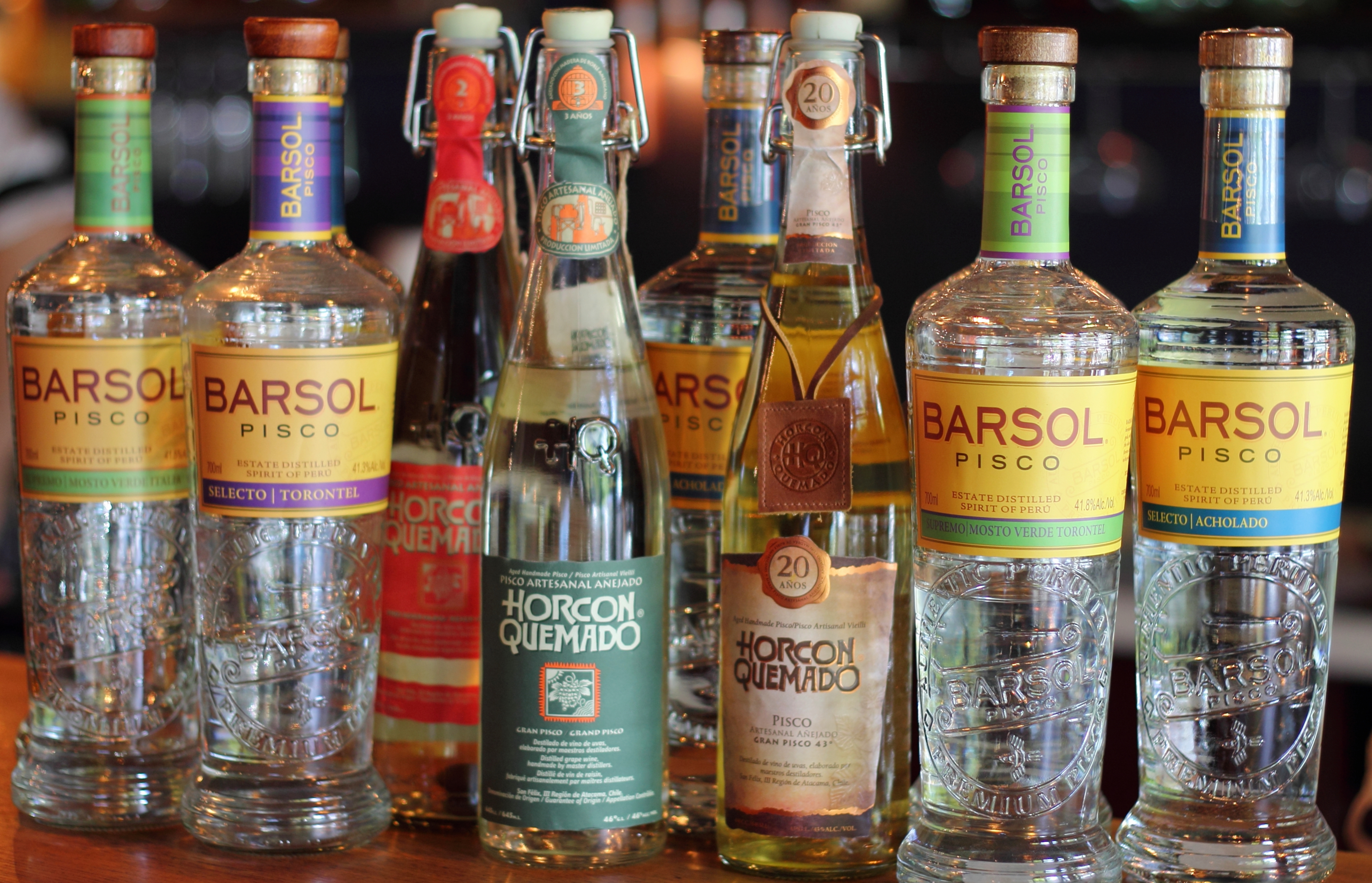
- Type: Distilled alcoholic beverage (Brandy)
- Origin: Peru
- Alcohol by volume: 33–50%
- Color: clear or yellow
- Ingredients: Water, grapes
- Related products: Singani

Cultural Heritage of Peru
- Official name: Pisco
- Type: Intangible
- Criteria: Knowledge, skills and practices associated with traditional medicine and gastronomy, among others
- Designated: 7 April 1988; 38 years ago
- Legal basis: R.J. Nº 179

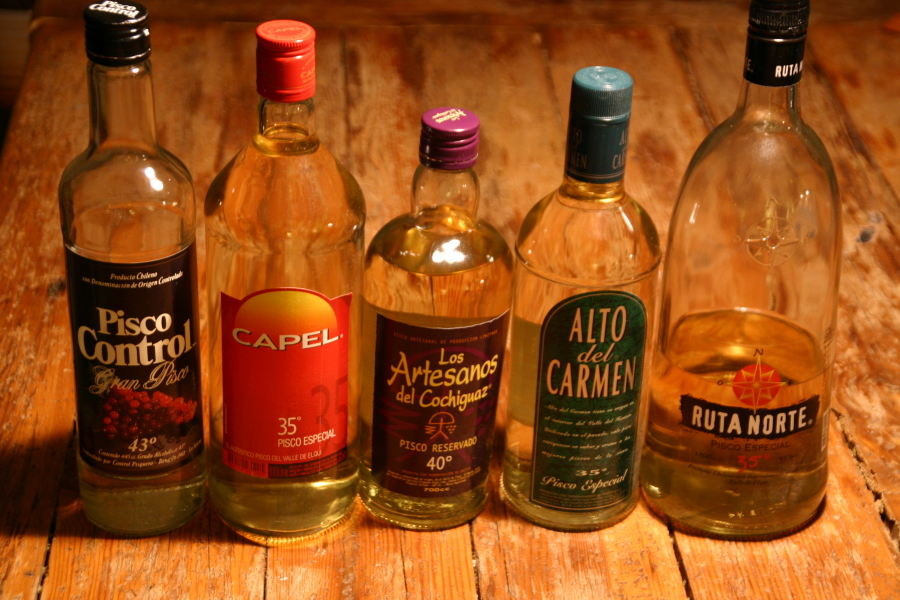
A selection of popular Chilean piscos

Pisco is a colorless or yellowish-to-amber-colored spirit produced in winemaking regions of Peru and Chile. Made by distilling fermented grape juice into a high-proof spirit, it was developed by 16th-century Spanish settlers as an alternative to orujo, a pomace brandy that was being imported from Spain. It had the advantages of being produced from abundant domestically grown fruit and reducing the volume of alcoholic beverages transported to remote locations.

== Etymology ==
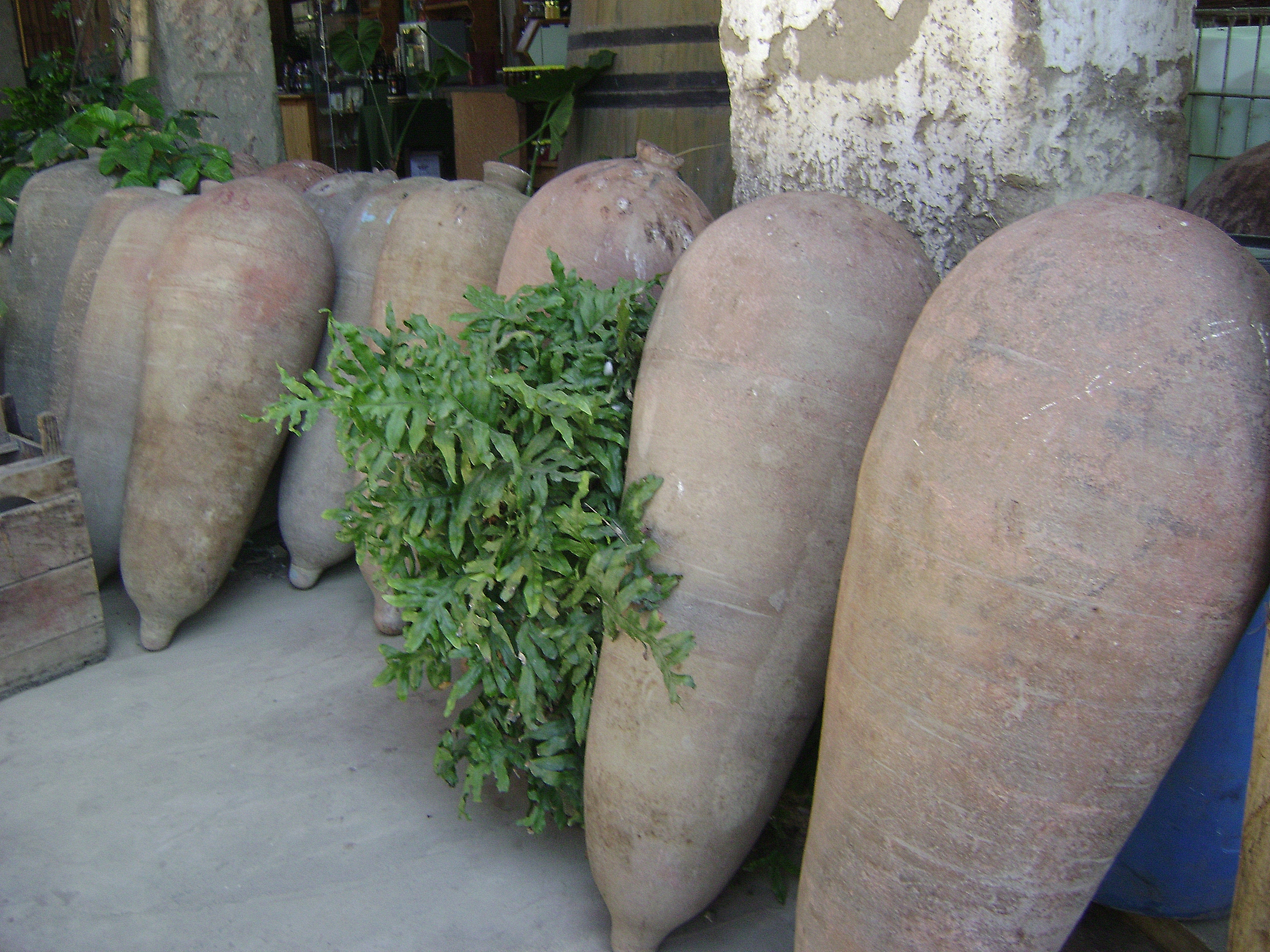
Colonial era amphorae called pisko in Cañete Valley, Peru

The oldest use of the word pisco to denote Peruvian aguardiente dates from 1764. The beverage may have acquired its Quechua name from the Peruvian town of Pisco, once an important colonial port for the exportation of viticultural products, which is located on the coast of Peru in the valley of Pisco, by the river with the same name. From there, "Aguardiente de Pisco" was exported to Europe, especially Spain, where the beverage's name was abbreviated to "Pisco".

The Viennese newspaper Wiener Zeitung in 1835 reported on the Peruvian spirit made from Italia grapes:

A large quantity of a spirit known as Pisco de Italia, imported from Peru, was consumed in Chile. But since the import duties are so high, a similar grape with large oval berries has been used to produce a similar drink, which has almost completely displaced the Peruvian. [Ehemals wurde in Chile eine große Menge des unter dem Nahmen Pisco de Italia im Lande bekannten Branntweins verbraucht, der aus Peru kam; aber seitdem die Einfuhrzölle so hoch sind, hat man aus einer Art Traube mit großen ovalen Beeren ein ähnliches Getränk bereitet, welches das peruanische fast gänzlich verdrängt hat.]

— Wiener Zeitung, Saturday, 1 August 1835, page 1

In the Medical Lexikon of Robley Dunglison (1858) it is stated that, following observations of Swiss Johann Jakob von Tschudi:

In Peru, the common brandy obtained from grapes is the Aguardiente de Pisco, so called because shipped at the port of Pisco.

— Medical Lexicon: A Dictionary of Medical Science, 1858, page 859

Chilean linguist Rodolfo Lenz said that the word pisco was used all along the Pacific coast of the Americas from Arauco to Guatemala, and that the word would be of Quechua origin meaning "bird".

This claim is disputed by Chilean linguist Mario Ferreccio Podesta, who supports the former Real Academia Española etymology according to which pisco was originally a word for a mud container. However, the Real Academia Española later supported Lenz's theory, and underlines the Quechua origin.

Other origins for the word pisco have been explored, including a Mapudungun etymology where "pishku" has been interpreted as "something boiled in a pot", which would relate to the concept of burned wine (Spanish: vino quemado).

== History ==
=== Early Aguardientes ===
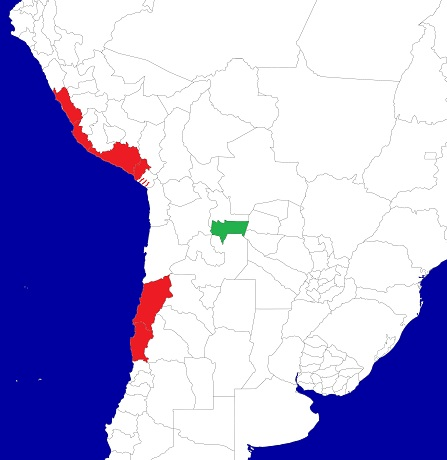
Zones of pisco production as established by Peruvian and Chilean law in red; the Department of Tarija, Bolivia, where most singani is produced in green

Unlike the land in most of the Viceroyalty of New Spain, where only very few vineyards were established (mostly for the production of sacramental wine), some locations in the Viceroyalty of Peru were quite suitable for growing grape vines. By 1560, Peru was already producing wine for commerce; over time, a significant wine industry arose in the region. It grew sufficiently strong and threatening to the Spanish mercantilist policies that in 1595 the Spanish Crown banned the establishment of new vineyards in the Americas to protect the exports of its native wine industry; however, this order was largely ignored. As further protectionist measures, the Crown forbade exportation of Peruvian wine to Panama in 1614 and Guatemala in 1615.

In 1572, Santa Maria Magdalena, a town in Peru, had a port by the name Pisco. Pisco became a crucial route for distribution of an alcoholic beverage – aguardiente. Port of Pisco shortened the name to just Pisco, which was the name of the grape liqueur that was originated in the area.

Distillation of the wine into pisco began in earnest around the turn of the 17th century, perhaps in response to these pressures. Until the early 18th century, however, most aguardiente was still primarily used to fortify wine, in order to prevent its oxidation, rather than drunk on its own. This method of conservation corresponds with fortified wines that were shipped to Italy and Spain from other parts of the world e.g., wines from Madeira and Marsala.

In the 17th century, production and consumption of wine and pisco were stimulated by the mining activities in Potosí, by then the largest city in the New World.

=== Recession of Peruvian pisco ===
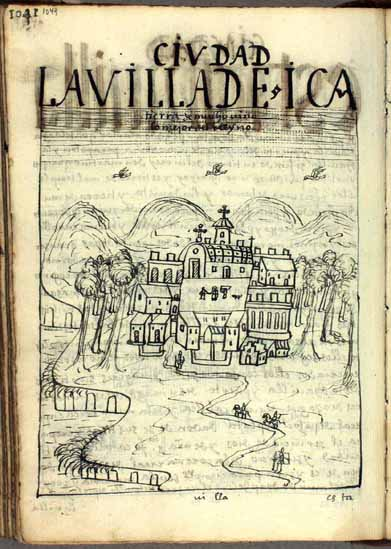
"The town of Ica, land of much wine, the best of the kingdom", painting of 1615 by the Inca painter Guamán Poma in his work "Nueva corónica y buen gobierno". Royal Library, Denmark.

Historians state that the first grapes ever imported arrived in 1553. The production of pisco started at the end of the 16th century. After the process of fermentation and distillation the juice from the grapes was then made in to liquor. This juice was then stored in clay jars called piscos.

The entire southern coast of Peru was struck by the 1687 Peru earthquake, which destroyed the cities of Villa de Pisco and Ica. Wine cellars in the affected area collapsed and mud containers broke, causing the nation's wine-growing industry to collapse.

In the early 18th century, wine production in Peru exceeded that of pisco. By 1764, pisco production dwarfed that of wine, representing 90% of the grape beverages prepared. With the suppression of the Society of Jesus in Spanish America, Jesuit vineyards were auctioned off, and new owners typically did not have the same expertise as the Jesuits – leading to a production decline.

In the late 18th century the Spanish Crown allowed the production of rum in Peru, which was cheaper and of lower quality than pisco. In the 19th century demand for cotton in industrialized Europe caused many Peruvian winegrowers to shift away from vineyards to more lucrative cotton planting, contributing further to the decline of wine production and the pisco industry which depended on it. This was particularly true during the time of the American Civil War (1861–1865) when cotton prices skyrocketed due to the Blockade of the South and its cotton fields.

Pisco was also popular in the US, in San Francisco and nearby areas of California since the 1830s, during the Gold Rush, in the 1860s, and early to mid 1900s.

== Origin dispute ==
There has been some controversy over whether Pisco originated in Chile or Peru. Both countries say that pisco is their national drink. Peru and Chile both rely on agricultural development for exportation. However, culture and history is what drives this dispute. Both countries want to show national spirit and have the right to call the centuries-old pisco their own. There may never be a specific geographical designation when it comes to the branding of pisco. There will almost never be a label that says "Peruvian pisco" or "Chilean pisco" as there is a special agreement for protection of the beverage. This agreement prohibits many kinds of branding that suggest country names.

== Variants ==
=== Peruvian pisco ===
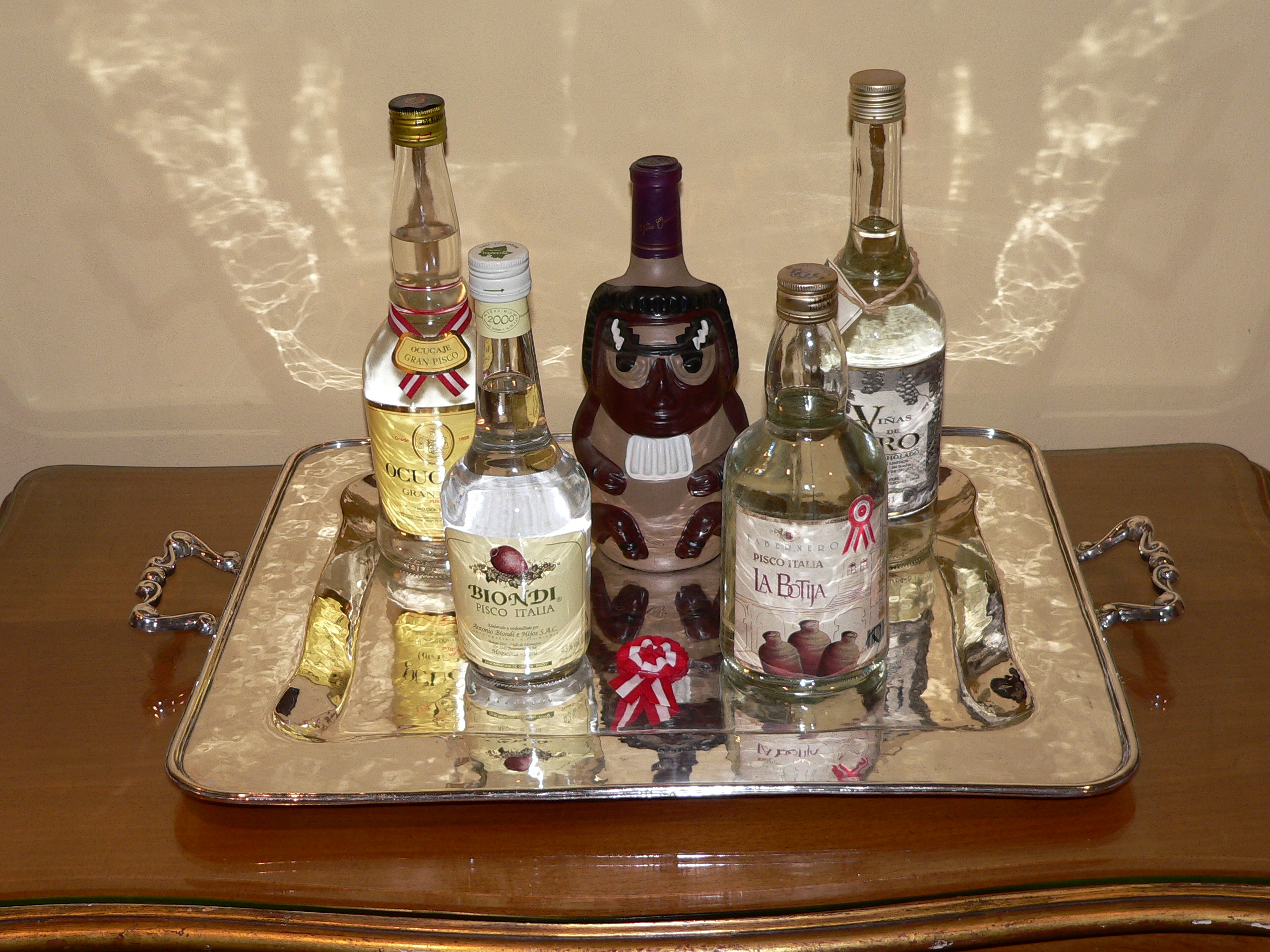
Bottles of Peruvian pisco

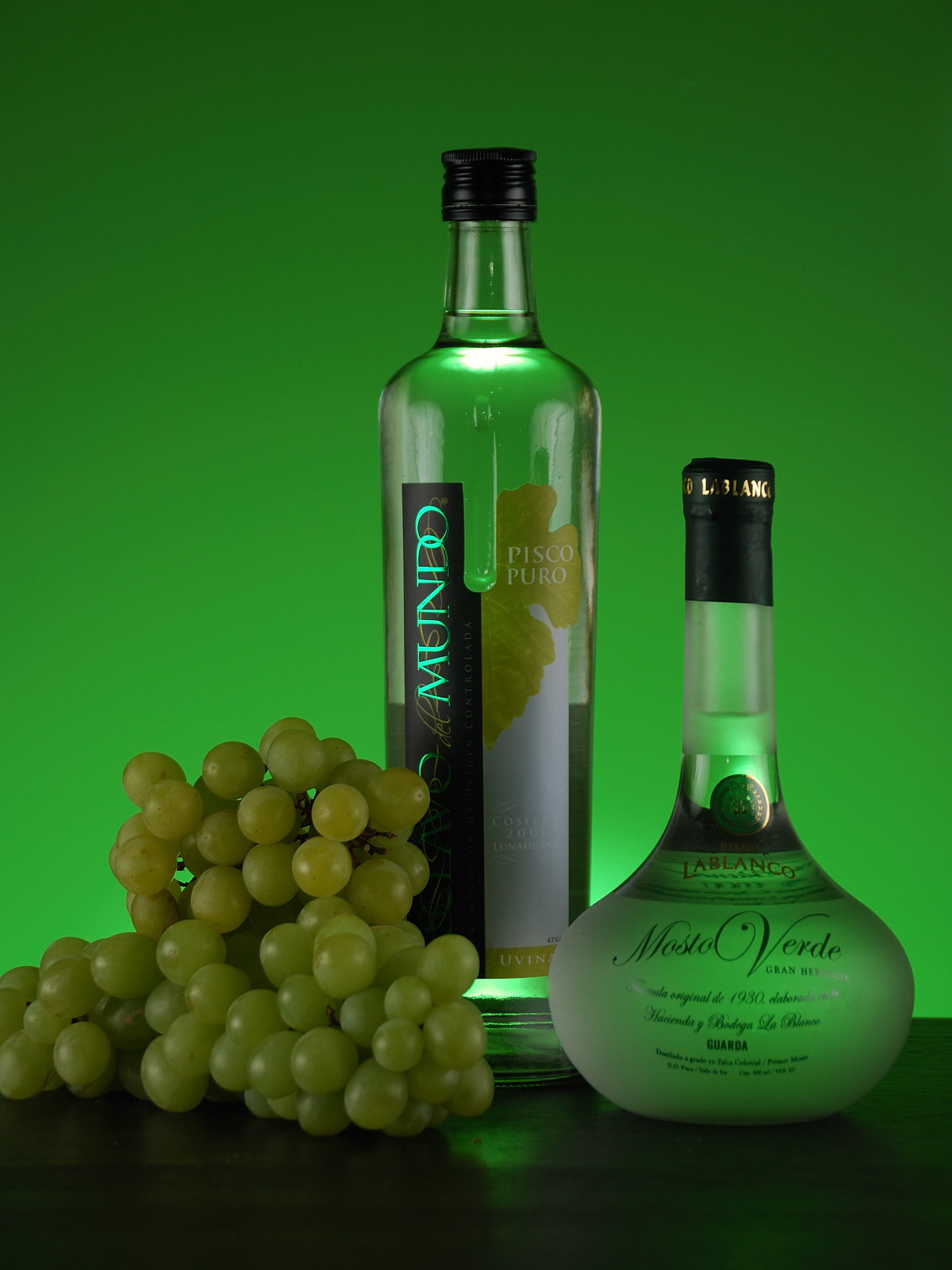
Compositioned picture of two bottles of Pisco produced in Peru

Peruvian pisco must be made in the country's five official D.O. (Denomination of Origin) departments—Lima, Ica, Arequipa, Moquegua and Tacna (only in the valleys of Locumba Locumba, Sama and Caplina)— established in 1991 by the government.

In Peru, pisco is produced only using copper pot stills, like single malt Scotch whiskies, rather than continuous stills like most vodkas. Unlike the Chilean variety, Peruvian pisco is never diluted after it is distilled and enters the bottle directly at its distillation strength. The production of a regular Peruvian Pisco bottle requires 8 kilograms of grapes, and a Mosto Verde variety needs 12 kg.

Many types of grapes were used to produce pisco, leading to a wide variation in flavor, aroma, viscosity and appearance of the liquor. This harmed attempts to export the product under a single denomination, resulting in numerous regulations setting a baseline for a product to carry the name. Four distinct types of pisco were thus designated:

- Puro (Pure), made from a single variety of grape, mostly Quebranta, although Mollar or Common Black can be used; however, no blending between varieties is accepted ("pure" pisco should contain only one variety of grape).
- Aromáticas (Aromatic), made from Muscat or Muscat-derived grape varieties, and also from Albilla, Italia and Torontel grape varieties; once again, the pisco should only contain one variety of grape in any production lot.
- Mosto Verde (Green Must), distilled from partially fermented must, this must be distilled before the fermentation process has completely transformed sugars into alcohol.
- Acholado (Multivarietal), blended from the must of several varieties of grape.

In 2008, Peruvian pisco exports 48 percent more than Chile compared to the year before that, exceeding 1 million dollars, although Chile produces about three times as much pisco as Peru. Chile is also the top importer of pisco from Peru: 34% of the pisco produced in Peru is exported to Chile. Annually, the pisco production in 2013 reached 30 million litres in Chile and 9.5 million litres in Peru.

Peruvian pisco won over 20 gold medals and was named the best liquor of the world in the Concours Mondial de Bruxelles 2011.

=== Chilean pisco ===
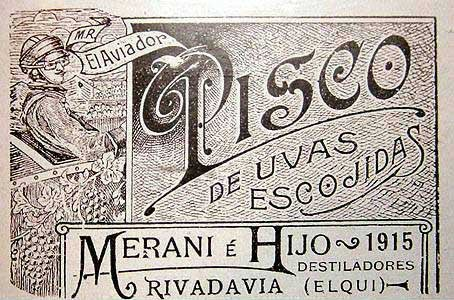
Chilean "Pisco Aviador" label from 1915

Chilean pisco must be made in the country's two official D.O. (Denomination of Origin) regions—Atacama and Coquimbo—established in 1931 by the government. Most of it is produced with a "boutique" type of distillate. Other types are produced with double distillation in copper and other materials.

During the adaptation of many vineyards to pisco production, the most widespread grape was used as raw material, the Muscat, with some vineyards preferring the Torontel and Pedro Jiménez varieties. As is the case with Peru, regulations for pisco designations have been enacted in Chile, including the following classifications:

- Pisco Corriente o Tradicional, 30% to 35% (60 to 70 proof)
- Pisco Especial, 35% to 40% (70 to 80 proof)
- Pisco Reservado, 40% (80 proof)
- Gran Pisco, 43% or more (86 or more proof)

Regulation for pisco production in Chile is quite high. Chilean distilleries are required to grow their own grapes and are grouped into two categories based in aromatic expressiveness: Muscat types (Pink Muscat, Muscat of Alexandria) are very fragrant, while Pedro Jiménez, Moscatel de Asturia and Torontel are more subtle.

The Special and Reserve variations are very similar in flavor and color, both being subtly sweet and of a clear birch to transparent color. The flavor is much stronger than regular pisco with aromatic refreshing tones.

== Manufacturing process ==
The processes of making pisco all come from the fermentation of specific grapes called Muscat or Italia grapes. The grapes are then distilled in copper basins. However, before this, the grapes have to go through a process called grape-stomping. Grapes stomping usually occurs in the afternoon to avoid the dry heat on the coast of Peru. A group of men spread around the winepress and stomp on the grapes for about 6 intervals. During this process the men will enjoy their time as they sing, joke around, and have pisco punch. The grape juice then falls into a saturation basin called puntaya. Here the juice will sit for 24 hours. Later, the juices are restored in fermentation tubs. The fermentation process usually lasts 7 days. This is so the natural yeasts in the grape skin take in sugars and process it into alcohol. Usually, the pisco producers will control the temperature of the fermentation so the heat does not increase. Otherwise, the natural aroma of the grapes will evaporate and not give the pisco a certain characteristic that is crucial in high quality pisco. When the fermentation process is over, the pisco is distilled in large copper basins.

== Ecological concerns ==
Chile has taken steps to have a clean and environmentally friendly production of pisco. In order to crack down on pollution, and to increase competitiveness, the National Council for Clean Production agreed with the pisco producers and pisco grape agronomists to collaborate, signing an Agreement of Clean Production (APL). Capel, by itself invested more than CL$ 800 million.

Peru's production of pisco remains artisanal and does not alter the physical, chemical or organic properties before bottling. The pisco must be bottled directly after aging, without alteration or adding any product which could alter the odor, flavor or appearance.

== Appellation of origin ==
The right to use an appellation of origin for pisco is hotly contested between Peru and Chile, though historians generally believe that pisco originated from Peru.

Peru claims the exclusive right to use the term "pisco" only for products from Peru, but they have not generally been able to persuade other countries to adopt that interpretation. Chile, in contrast, regards the term "pisco" as generic, and it argues the spirit is simply a type of alcoholic beverage made from grapes (as in the case of whisky and vodka). It cites the name being used to designate a similar grape brandy produced in both countries and maintains two regions of Chile, Atacama and Coquimbo, that it authorizes to use the term.

Large-market countries (e.g., the European Union, the United States, France, Italy, Mexico, Canada, Australia, etc.) generally allow products of both Peru and Chile to be identified as "pisco". The European Commission considers that pisco originates from Peru, but also allows the term to be used for products from Chile.

== Cocktails ==
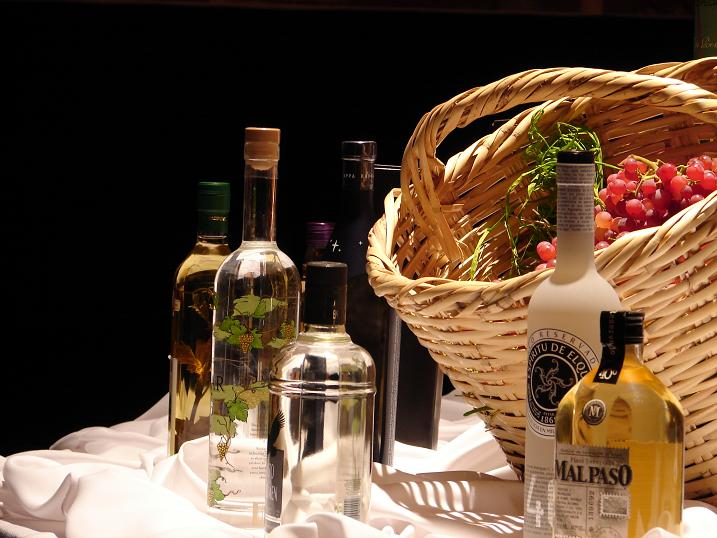
Pisco produced in Chile

Some of the most popular cocktails with pisco include:

- Pisco sour is made with pisco, egg whites and dash of bitters.
- Chilcano (Pisco, Ginger Ale, Lime wedge, or wheel, for garnish). It has variations with lime, blood orange, grapefruit, and pineapple.
- Monkey Tail (Cola de Mono or Colemono), is a traditional Chilean drink served around Christmas time. It contains aguardiente
- Pisco Punch, the first known pisco cocktail, invented in San Francisco, California, in the 19th century. It contains pineapple, gum arabic, and syrup, among other ingredients.
- Serena Libre, sweeter than Pisco Sour, made with Chilean papaya juice and sugar.
- Pisquiña, very similar to Caipirinha, it has Pisco, Chilean Pica lime juice, white sugar and ice.
- Mojito de Cuma, a Chilean version of a cocktail similar to Mojito, is made with Pisco, Sprite, 7Up or a similar soda and mint leaves. Thanks to those sodas' sweetness, it doesn't require sugar.
- Piscola Blanca, a variation of Piscola in Chile with clear sodas.
- Pisagua Chilean Pisco with carbonated water.
- Pischela, another variation of Chilean Piscola, similar to a British "submarine" it is Pisco with beer, preferably a blonde beer.
- Terremoto, a traditional Chilean cocktail made of Pipeño strengthened with Pisco, Fernet (optional), pineapple ice cream and Grenadine syrup.
- Piscoffee, Pisco with iced coffee and ice. Also is a variation of Irish coffee with pisco instead of whiskey.
- Cóctel de Algarrobina, Peruvian Pisco with algarrobina syrup (or carob syrup), cinnamon, egg yolk, and cream.
- Pisco Flip, a flip on the traditional Pisco Sour, made with egg yolks instead of whites.
- Cupid's Cup, Peruvian pisco, aperol, fresh lemon juice, simple syrup, and egg whites. A thyme sprig is used for decoration.
- Tampisco Bay, a cocktail inspired by Tampa Bay, Florida. Made using pisco and fresh cucumber juice, agave nectar, jalapeño slices, and red bell pepper slices and served in an ice filled highball glass.

=== Mixed drinks ===
Some examples of mixed drinks with pisco include:

- Canario
- Capitán
- Chilcano de Pisco, a Peruvian cocktail made with Pisco, lemon juice, ice, bitters, and ginger ale.
- Piscola, also called "national cocktail" in Chile (Spanish: Combinado nacional or combinado) a cocktail prepared mixing Coca-Cola and pisco. Other combinations of Pisco and cola include the Perú Libre differentiating the same drink made with different origin piscos.
- Pisco Sorpresa, a cocktail originated in East London, inspired by the Latin American classic. Involves shaking gin, Cointreau, triple sec, Bacardi and pisco, adding raspberry juice, pouring into a cocktail glass and finishing off with a dash of soda, grenadine and a squeeze of lemon.
- Piscotheque
- Roller Pisco
- Don Alfredo, a Peruvian cocktail made with mosto verde Pisco, St Germain, lime juice, ice and soda water.

== Consumption ==
Per capita consumption of pisco in Chile is 3 litres per year; an average of 18% of pisco production by value is premium pisco. Peruvian annual per capita consumption was reported in 2008 as 0.5 litres and growing (at the expense of market shares for rum and whisky, although whisky remains the most popular spirit in Peru). 2014 reports mention also an increase of 3.5 million liters per year for the internal market.

The top importer of Peruvian pisco is Chile, with an estimated import value of US$1.6 million in 2016. The United States is the second highest importer, with an estimated import value of US$1.4 million.

== See also ==
- List of piscos
- Singani
- Cocoroco
