= Fiestas Patrias (Chile) =

Festival and celebration in Chile on 18 September

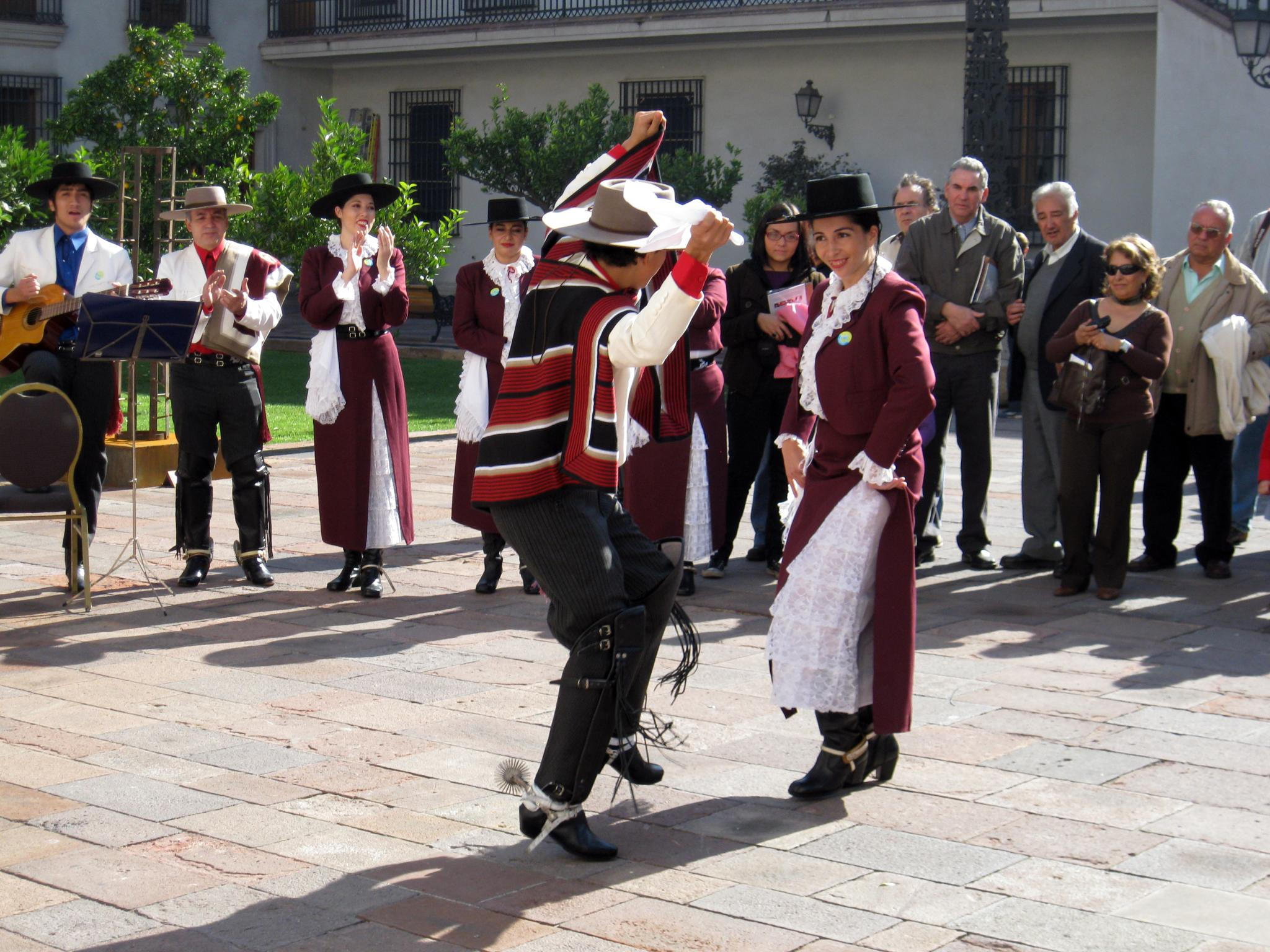
- People dancing cueca in the Palace of La Moneda
- Also called: El Dieciocho (en: The Eighteenth)
- Observed by: Chilean people and residents on its territory.
- Type: National
- Significance: Date of the First National Meeting of Government in 1810.
- Date: 18 September
- Frequency: Annual

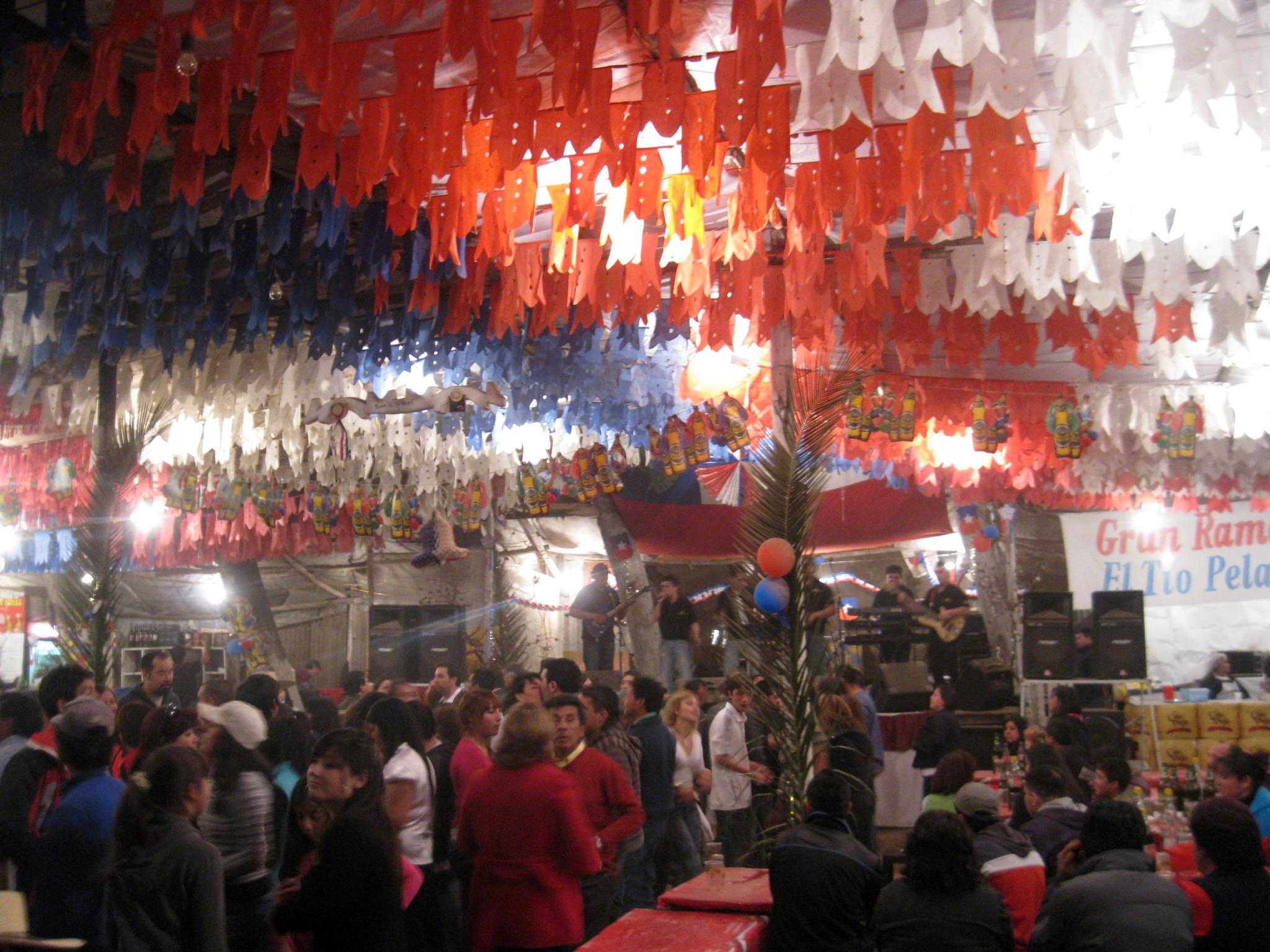
View of a fonda or ramada, one of the temporary buildings that house the celebrations.

The Fiestas Patrias (literally Homeland Holidays) of Chile consist of two days, with a third one added on some years:

- 18 September, in commemoration of the proclamation of the First Governing Body of 1810, and marking the beginning of the Chilean Independence process.
- 19 September, known as the "Day of the Glories of the Army".
- Since 2007, 17 September (if it should be a Monday) or 20 September (if it should be a Friday) will be included as well.
- Since 2017, 17 September (if it should be a Friday) will also be included.

Within Chile the Fiestas Patrias are often referred to as the Dieciocho, or "18th" because the celebration occurs on 18 September. Unofficially, the celebration can last for around a week, depending on when it falls. For example, if the 18th is a Wednesday, public holidays are from Wednesday the 18th to Friday the 20th and celebrations begin the afternoon of Tuesday the 17th and continue until Sunday the 22nd. It is held close to the spring equinox of the Southern Hemisphere so it doubles as a spring festival. Chile's Declaration of Independence happened on 12 February. Most schools and jobs declare a week-long vacation for the holiday. This day is very important to the Chilean people because they are celebrating their freedom from Spanish rule.

The original purpose of 18 September was to celebrate the anniversary of the First National Government Junta (18 September 1810). Likewise, other patriotic public holidays were added: 5 April (Battle of Maipú, 1818) in 1819, and 12 February (Declaration of Independence, 1818) in 1821. In 1837, following the repeal of 5 April as a public holiday and the reduction of celebrations on 12 February, the purpose of 18 September became the commemoration of the process of independence from the Spanish Crown and the formation of Chile as a nation-state.

In its early years, the National Holidays lasted several days. Law No. 2977 of 1 February 1915 officially fixed them as two days in September: the 18th, “commemoration of National Independence,” and the 19th, “celebration of all the glories of the Army”, both of which are among the country’s five mandatory and non-waivable public holidays, (Note: The other mandatory and non-waivable public holidays in Chile are New Year’s Day, Labour Day, and Christmas Day.) meaning that paid work is prohibited, except for certain entertainment services (cabarets, casinos, cinemas, clubs, discotheques, pubs, and restaurants) and emergency services (pharmacies). During these festivities, the hoisting of the Chilean flag is mandatory on all public and private buildings throughout the country.

To commemorate Chile’s independence, national authorities attend four official events: the Evangelical Thanksgiving Service (Servicio de Acción de Gracias evangélico), the Ecumenical Te Deum (Te Deum evangélico), the Presidential Gala (Gala presidencial), and the Military Parade (Parada Militar). The National Holidays highlight customs and traditions typical of national identity, known collectively as chilenidad (Chilean-ness), and constitute the most important celebrations in Chile and among Chilean communities abroad. During this period, fondas or ramadas are set up as entertainment venues, combining folk music and dance with traditional dishes and beverages of Chilean cuisine.

== Activities ==
The celebration of Fiestas Patrias is an expression of Chilean culture. Traditional activities associated with the Dieciocho include dancing the cueca, going to fondas, and barbecue. Officially, activities on September eighteen are centered on a religious celebration "Te Deum Ecuménico de Fiestas Patrias". This ceremony, which is organized by the Catholic Church and led by the Archbishop of Santiago, has taken place since 1811 when it was started by José Miguel Carrera. In 1971, President Salvador Allende asked that the celebration become more ecumenical, encompassing the diverse religious beliefs throughout the country. The ceremony itself begins at 11:00 am in the Plaza de Armas. Military parades and civil school parades are held on this day in major cities and towns nationwide. Many Chileans travel during the Fiestas Patrias to visit family, friends and relatives in other parts of the country and join the celebrations there. In Santiago, many people travel to resorts on the Pacific coast, especially Viña del Mar and the Litoral Central region. It is estimated that 2 million Chileans—nearly one-eighth of the country's population—travel during this holiday.

19 September, the anniversary of the installation of the First Government Council and the very first military parade in Chilean history, marks the grand finale: the Great Military Parade of Chile commemorating the glories of the Chilean Army, on Santiago's O'Higgins Park and overseen by the President of Chile in his/her performance of his/her constitutional mandate as Commander-in-Chief of the Armed Forces. Attracting millions of people, and simulcast live on radio, television and on the Internet, the parade, led by the Chilean Armed Forces (Chilean Army, Chilean Navy and Chilean Air Force) and the Carabineros de Chile, plus since 2019 the Investigations Police of Chile, takes place in the afternoon, and (when 19 September is a Sunday, Monday, Tuesday or Wednesday) marks the end of the holiday.

== Official activities ==
To commemorate the independence of Chile, the country’s authorities attend four official events: the Evangelical Thanksgiving Service, the Ecumenical Te Deum, the presidential gala, and the military parade.

=== Evangelical Thanksgiving Service ===
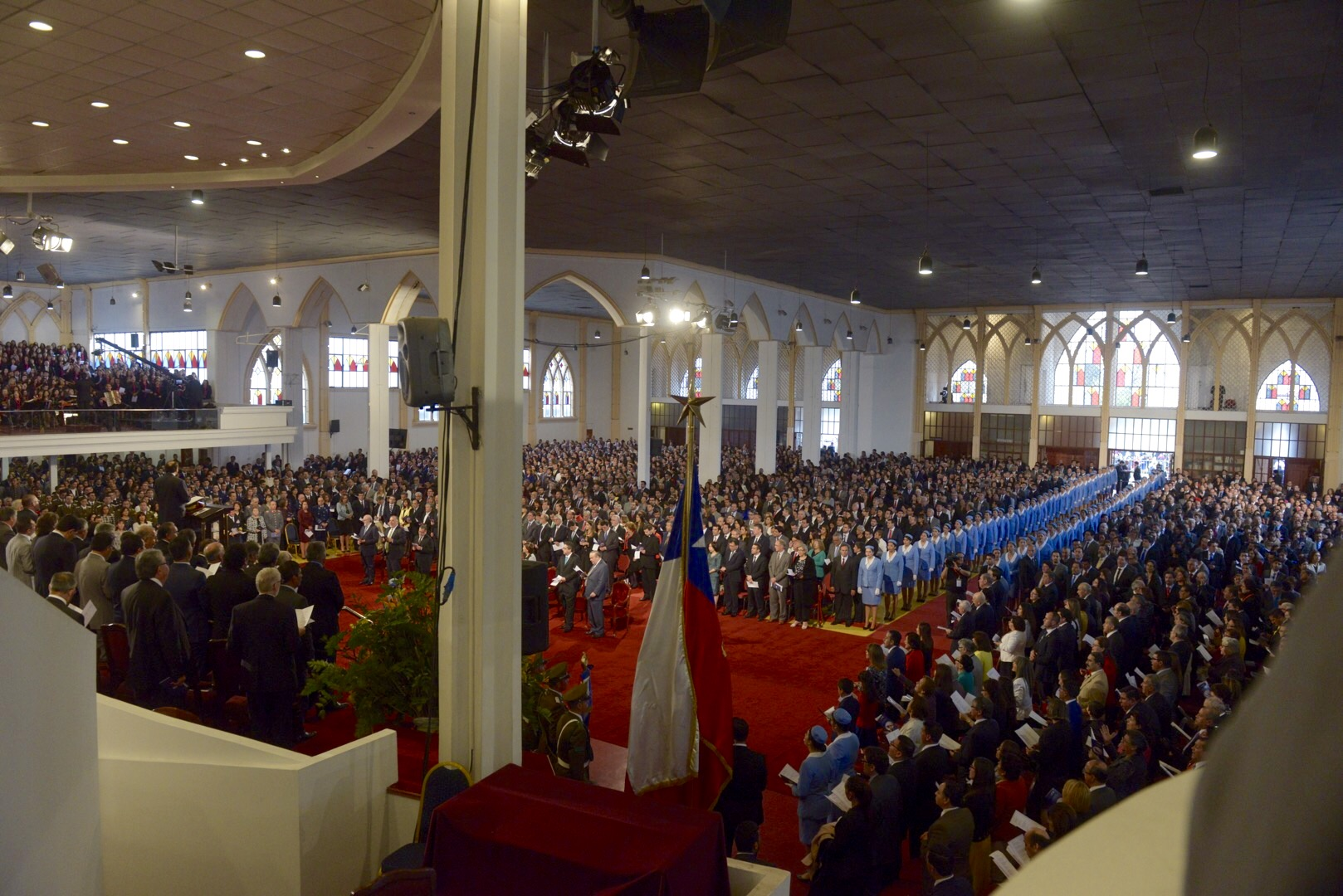
Te Deum evangélico, September 2016

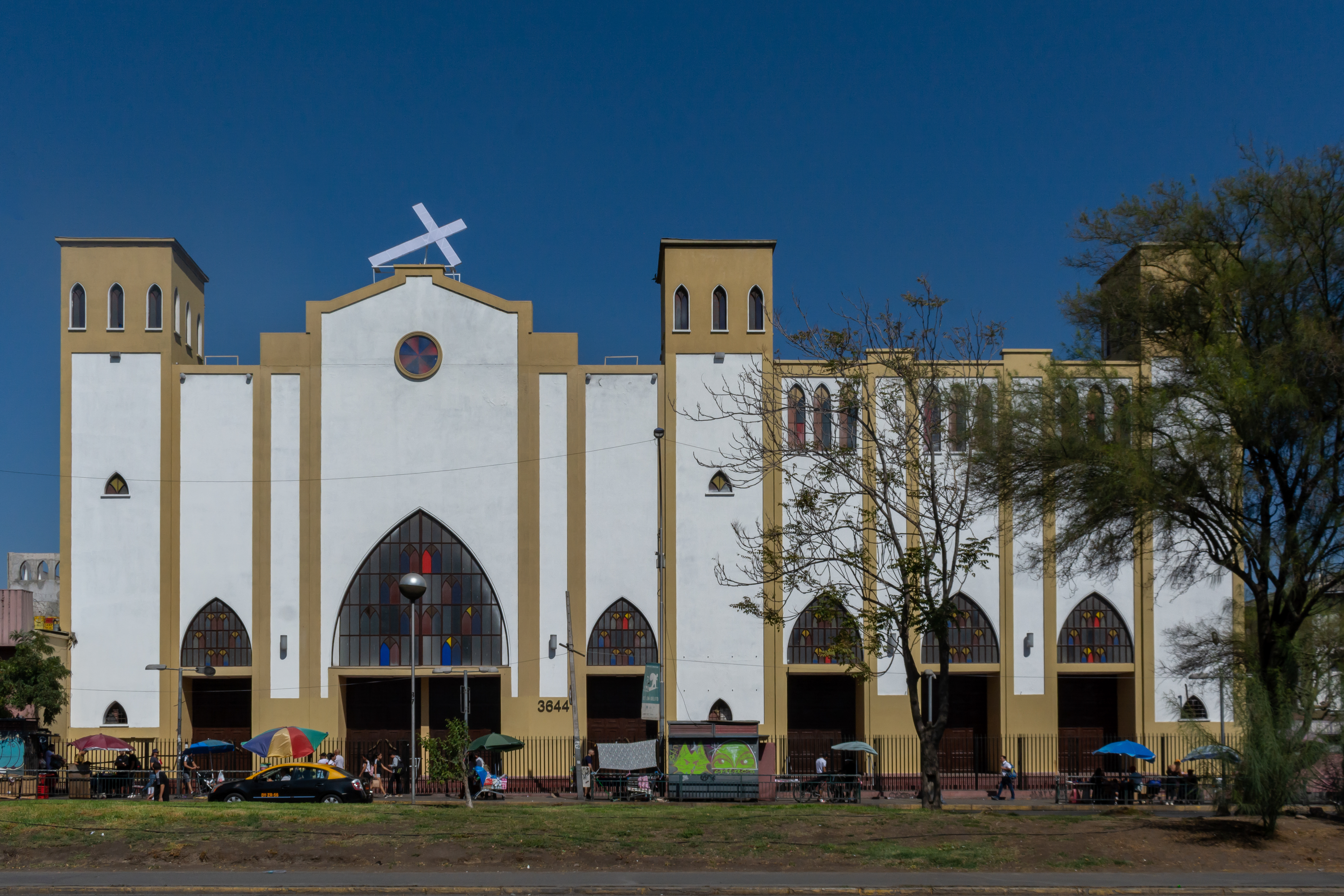
The Evangelical Cathedral of Chile in Santiago, commonly known as the Jotabeche Cathedral hosted the Evangelical Te Deum between 1975 and 2018

On the Sunday immediately preceding the Fiestas Patrias, the Evangelical Thanksgiving Service (Servicio de Acción de Gracias evangélico) of the Union of Evangelical Churches of Chile is held, popularly known as the Evangelical Te Deum (Te Deum evangélico). The main authorities of the country attend this ceremony, led by the President of the Republic.

This ceremony was established in 1975, and in 1997 the government of Eduardo Frei Ruiz-Tagle designated it as one of the four official activities of the Chilean government to commemorate the country’s independence.

This service has traditionally brought together members of Evangelical and Methodist Pentecostal churches, which for doctrinal reasons do not participate in the Ecumenical Te Deum. It was held at the Evangelical Cathedral of Chile (1975–2018), the main temple of the First Methodist Pentecostal Church of Chile (Primera Iglesia Metodista Pentecosta de Chile), and later at the International Christian Center (2019–2021). From 2022 onward, its organization has been assumed by the Methodist Pentecostal Church of Chile (IMPCH), led by Pastor Edmundo Zenteno Céspedes.

Additionally, the Jewish community residing in the country holds the “Tefilá por Chile” (Prayer for Chile) at the synagogue of the Sephardic Israeli community.

=== Ecumenical Te Deum ===
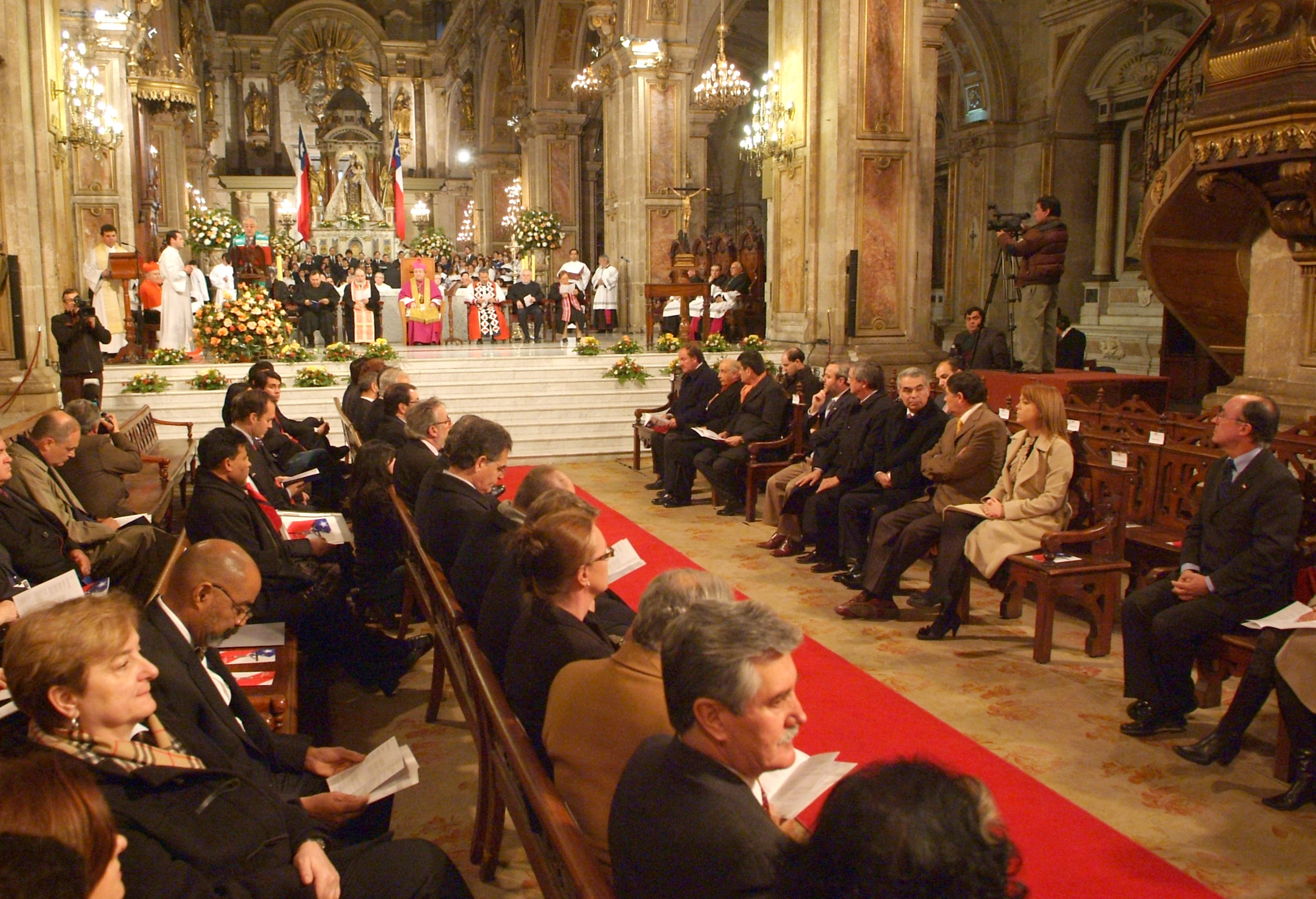
Te Deum commemorating the bicentennial of the Chilean National Congress at the Santiago Metropolitan Cathedral

Chile is one of the few countries in which a Te Deum, a hymn of praise to God originally performed as the concluding part of a Mass of thanksgiving—is celebrated in connection with its national holiday.

On 18 September 1811, a ceremony consisting of a “solemn Mass, sermon [delivered by the Dominican friar José María Torres], Te Deum, and three artillery salutes” was held to commemorate the first anniversary of the First National Government Junta. Since then, the Chilean Catholic Church has traditionally officiated a thanksgiving ceremony at the Metropolitan Cathedral of Santiago on the morning of 18 September, attended by the country’s main authorities and headed by the President of the Republic.

In 1870, the Eucharist was removed from the ceremony at the request of Minister Miguel Luis Amunátegui, as fasting by attendees was required in order to celebrate it. In November 1970, President Salvador Allende requested the inclusion of other Christian denominations in the ceremony beginning in 1971, thereby granting it the ecumenical character it maintains to this day.

=== Presidential Gala ===
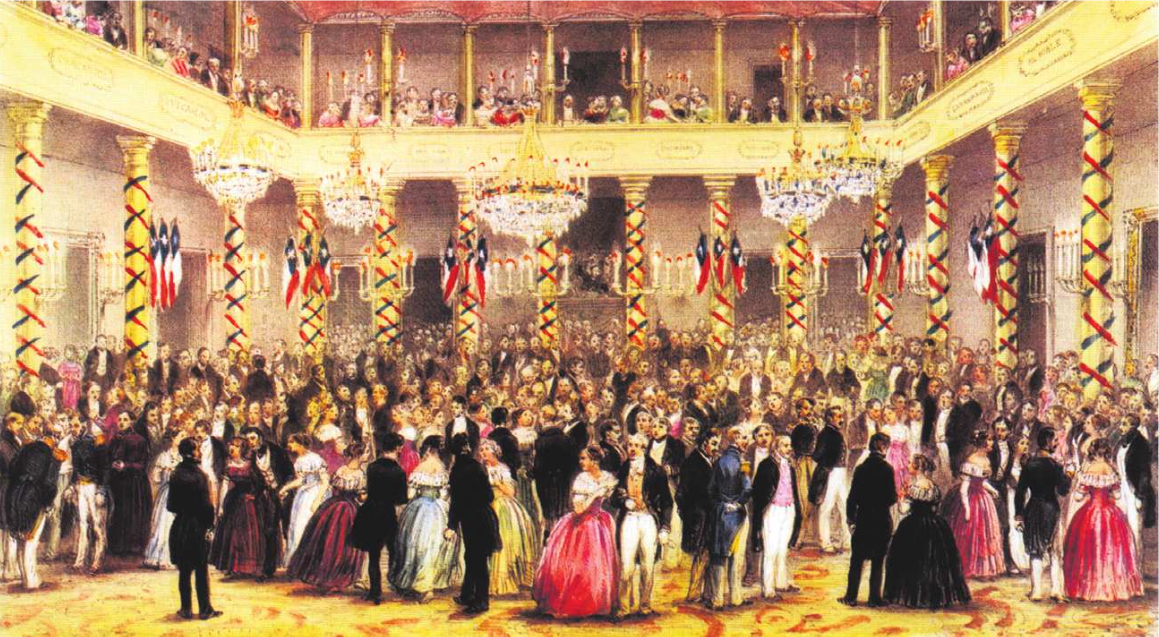
Un baile en la Casa del gobierno (Frédéric Lehnert, 1854)

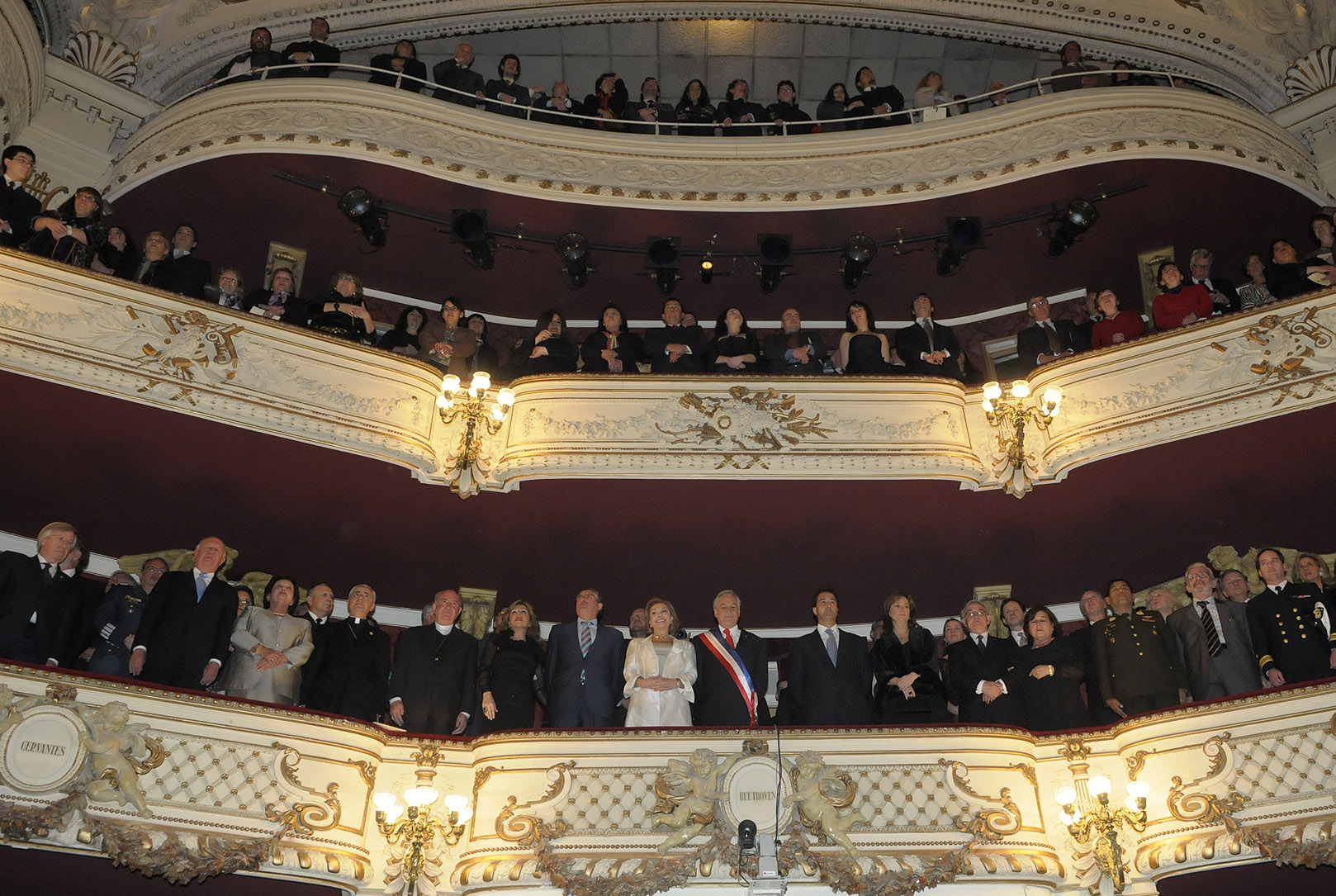
The President Sebastián Piñera, attended the event accompanied by his wife, Cecilia Morel, along with the country’s main authorities, to watch the opera Rigoletto by Giuseppe Verdi in 2010

On the evening of 18 September, the authorities move to the Municipal Theatre of Santiago, where an operatic gala is held, in keeping with a tradition established in 1910, when Aida by Giuseppe Verdi was performed. For the Bicentennial of Chile, Rigoletto, also by Verdi, was presented.

This event traces its origins to the formal ballroom dances held at La Moneda Palace to celebrate 18 September. The first of these took place on 30 September 1812 and was organized by José Miguel Carrera:

"[S]e eligieron tres suntuosos salones, que se destinaron, el primero [adornado con] 400 luces, para el baile de los convidados; otro, a la derecha [para] el ramillete [y] otro a la izquierda [para] la cena [...] El baile comenzó a las ocho de la noche por una contradanza general [...] Duró esta diversión toda la noche hasta las 6 de la mañana siguiente y para proporcionar el gusto y desahogo, alternativamente con los bailes se entonaban por el joven La Sala [...] canciones patrióticas[. Asistieron 61 señoras y no más de 200 hombres]."

Three sumptuous halls were selected: the first, adorned with 400 lights, was reserved for the guests’ dance; another, to the right, for refreshments; and another to the left, for dinner [...] The ball began at eight in the evening with a general contredanse [...] This entertainment lasted all night until six the following morning, and to provide variety and enjoyment, patriotic songs were alternated with the dances, performed by the young La Sala [...] Sixty-one ladies attended, and no more than 200 men.

On some occasions, instead of an opera, the presidential gala has consisted of a symphonic concert or a ballet. In 2014, a selection of musical works by Luis Advis, Vicente Bianchi, and Alfonso Leng was performed, while in 2024 the Santiago Philharmonic Orchestra performed Andante appassionato by Enrique Soro and Symphony No. 9 in D minor by Ludwig van Beethoven. In 2025, the Ballet of Santiago and the Santiago Philharmonic Orchestra presented the ballet Giselle by Adolphe Adam.

=== Military parade ===
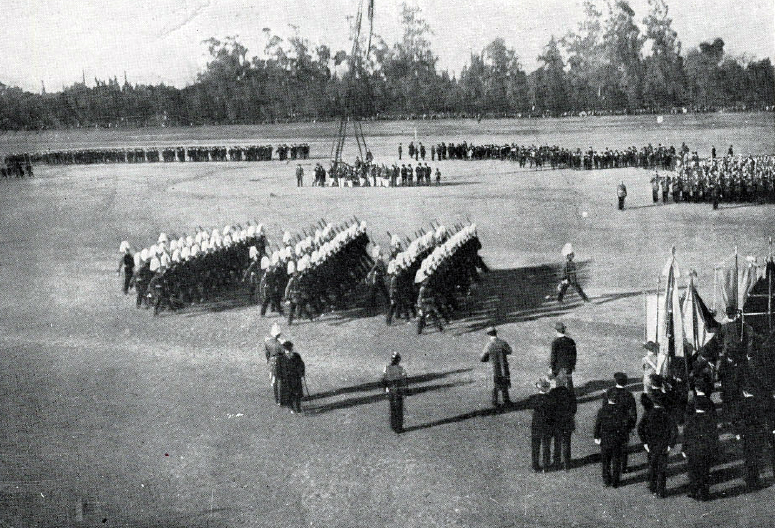
Military School parade during a parade (1912)

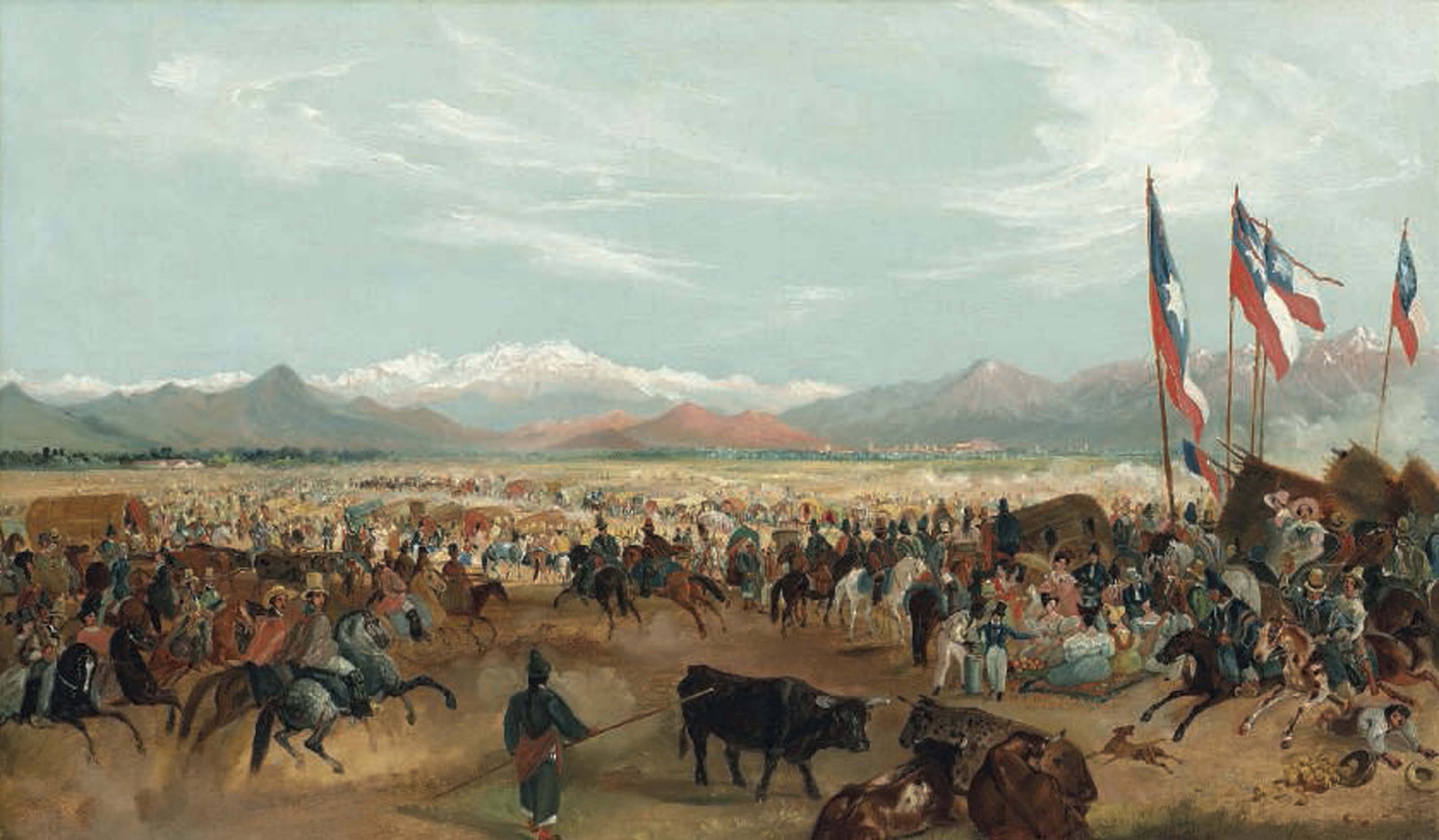
Llegada del presidente Prieto a la Pampilla (Mauricio Rugendas, 1834)

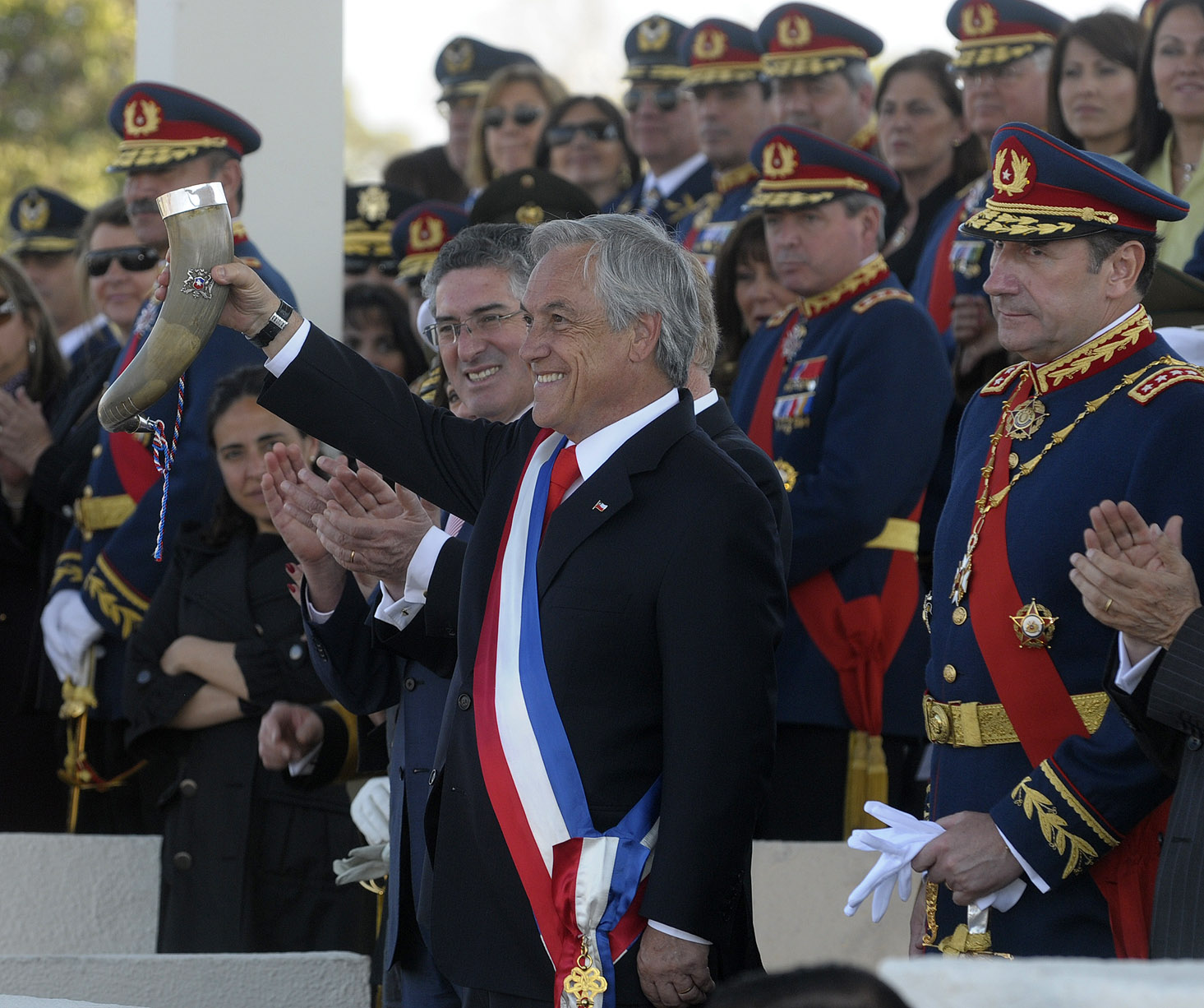
Toast with "chicha en cacho" (2010)

Following the creation of the Military Academy in 1817, military reviews and exercises, combat simulations, and “clearances” (despejes), as military parades were then known were held on the Llano de Portales. These spectacles were among the most attractive and well-attended public events during the early years of the Republic.

To enhance the patriotic celebrations, the first military review was carried out by order of Supreme Director Bernardo O’Higgins on 28 September 1819. The first official military parade took place during the government of Joaquín Prieto; it was presided over by Minister Diego Portales amid heavy rain at La Pampilla on 18 September 1832. Since then, the parade has been cancelled on four occasions: 1891, 1924, 1973, and 2020.

The tradition of holding military parades on 18 September continued in subsequent years. By a government order issued by President Jorge Montt, the parade was relocated in 1896 to the Campo de Marte, later redesigned as Parque Cousiño (renamed Parque O’Higgins in 1972). At that time, the parade adopted Prussian military traditions, some of which are still partially preserved today and began to be recorded in films such as Parada Militar del 19 en el Parque Cousiño (1902) and Gran Revista Militar en el Parque Cousiño (1910).

The military parade was officially moved to 19 September by Law No. 2977 of 1915, enacted during the government of Ramón Barros Luco, which established that date as a public holiday “in celebration of all the glories of the Army”. Until 1914, 19 September had merely been one of several public holidays included within the celebrations of 18 September. The only time this holiday has been suspended and declared a working day occurred in 1973.

The 1915 parade was led by the 6th Artillery Regiment “Tacna”, and featured the flyover of three Army aircraft. In September 1925, two military parades were held: one on the 10th, in honor of the visit of Edward, Prince of Wales, and another on the 19th, dedicated to all the glories of the Chilean Army. In 1931, a group of huasos on horseback was invited to parade in squadrons, and in 1943, armored vehicles participated for the first time, including fourteen M3A1 Stuart tanks.

In 1948, veterans of the War of the Pacific marched in the rain and were enthusiastically applauded by the public. That same year, the President of the Republic was offered chicha en cacho, chicha served in an ornamented horn—for a ceremonial toast to Chile. In 1969, an esquinazo was performed, during which a couple danced the cueca,ceremonies traditionally carried out by the Gil Letelier Huaso Club. In 1962, the parade was broadcast on television for the first time.

The military parade is presided over by the Head of Government and Head of State, accompanied by the Minister of National Defense and the Commander-in-Chief of the Army, and is held on the ellipse of O’Higgins Park. The event features the three branches of the Armed Forces of Chile—the Army, Navy, and Air Force, as well as Carabineros de Chile and, since 2019, the Investigative Police of Chile. Following the return to democracy in 1990, efforts have been made to create a less militaristic atmosphere, with a stronger emphasis on the presentation of troops. In addition to the parade of conscripts, performances are given by Army units and by the Air Force’s Halcones High Aerobatics Squadron.

== Use of the flag ==
Display of the Chilean flag

Decree No. 1534 of 12 December 1967 of the Ministry of the Interior established the obligation to fly the flag of Chile on all public and private buildings throughout the country on 18 and 19 September. Failure to comply results in “violations processed by the local police courts of each commune” and fines ranging from 1 to 5 UTM (Unidad tributaria mensual, Monthly Tax Units).

The Chilean flag must be clean and in perfect condition, displayed on a white flagpole whose height must not be less than four-thirds of the length of the flag, and flown at full mast. It may also be hung on the main façade either horizontally or vertically—in the latter case, the star must always be positioned in the upper left corner when viewed from the front of the façade.

On the occasion of the Bicentennial of the Republic of Chile, Decree No. 2850 of 24 August 2010 of the Ministry of the Interior ordered and authorized the flag to be flown at full mast on public buildings throughout the national territory for the entire month of September 2010, and also permitted, for the same period, its voluntary use and display on private buildings and residences, within the framework of the bicentennial celebrations.

In 1843, the government of Manuel Bulnes commissioned a melody from the composer José Zapiola for the text Canción a la bandera de Chile, the first hymn dedicated to the Chilean flag, written by Francisco Bello Boyland (1817–1845). This hymn was performed during the Fiestas Patrias of that year by the Fierro, Garfias, Hurtado, Necochea, and Recasens sisters, accompanied by a band.

== Customs and traditions ==
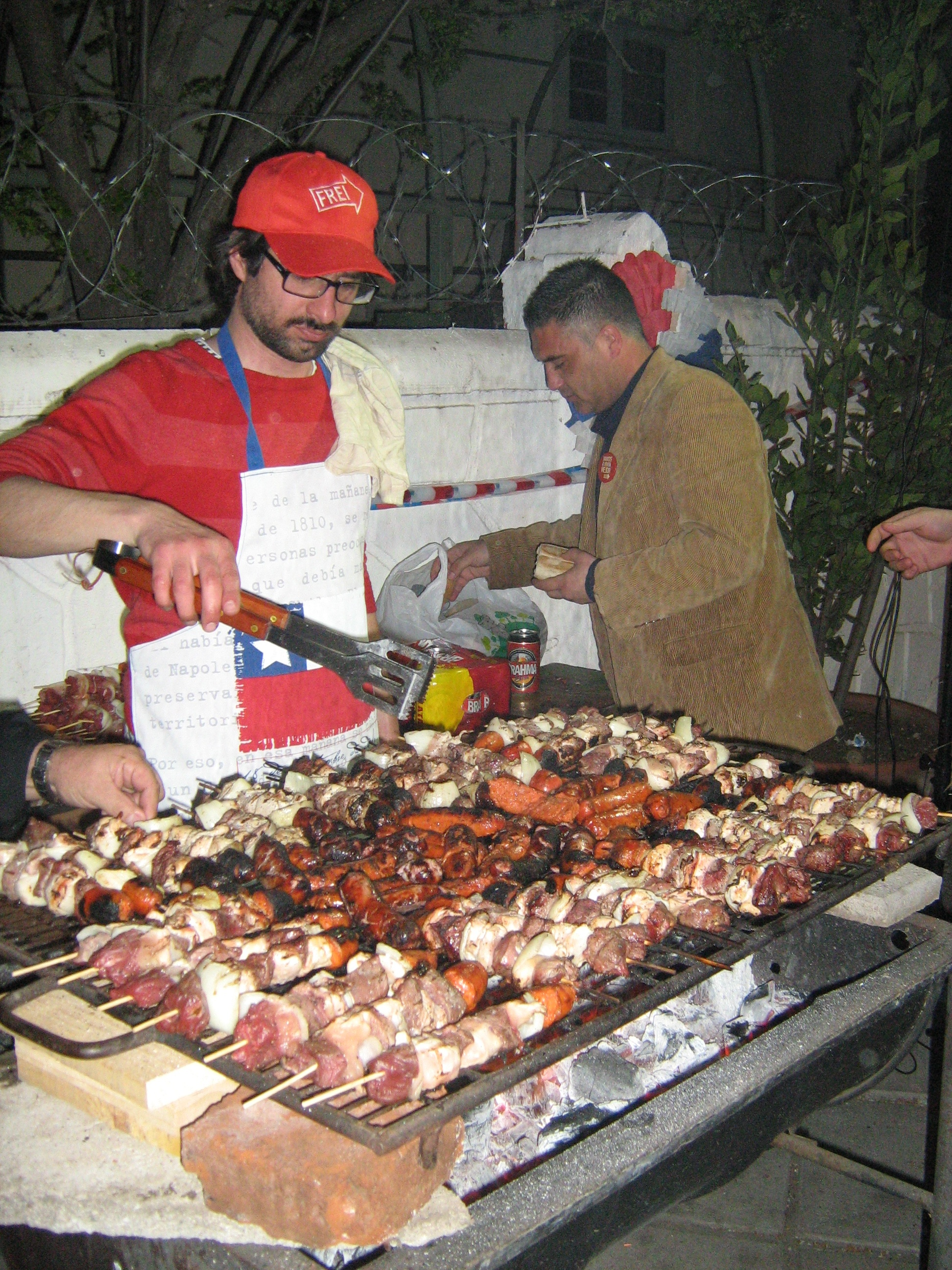
Barbecue or Asado Chileno

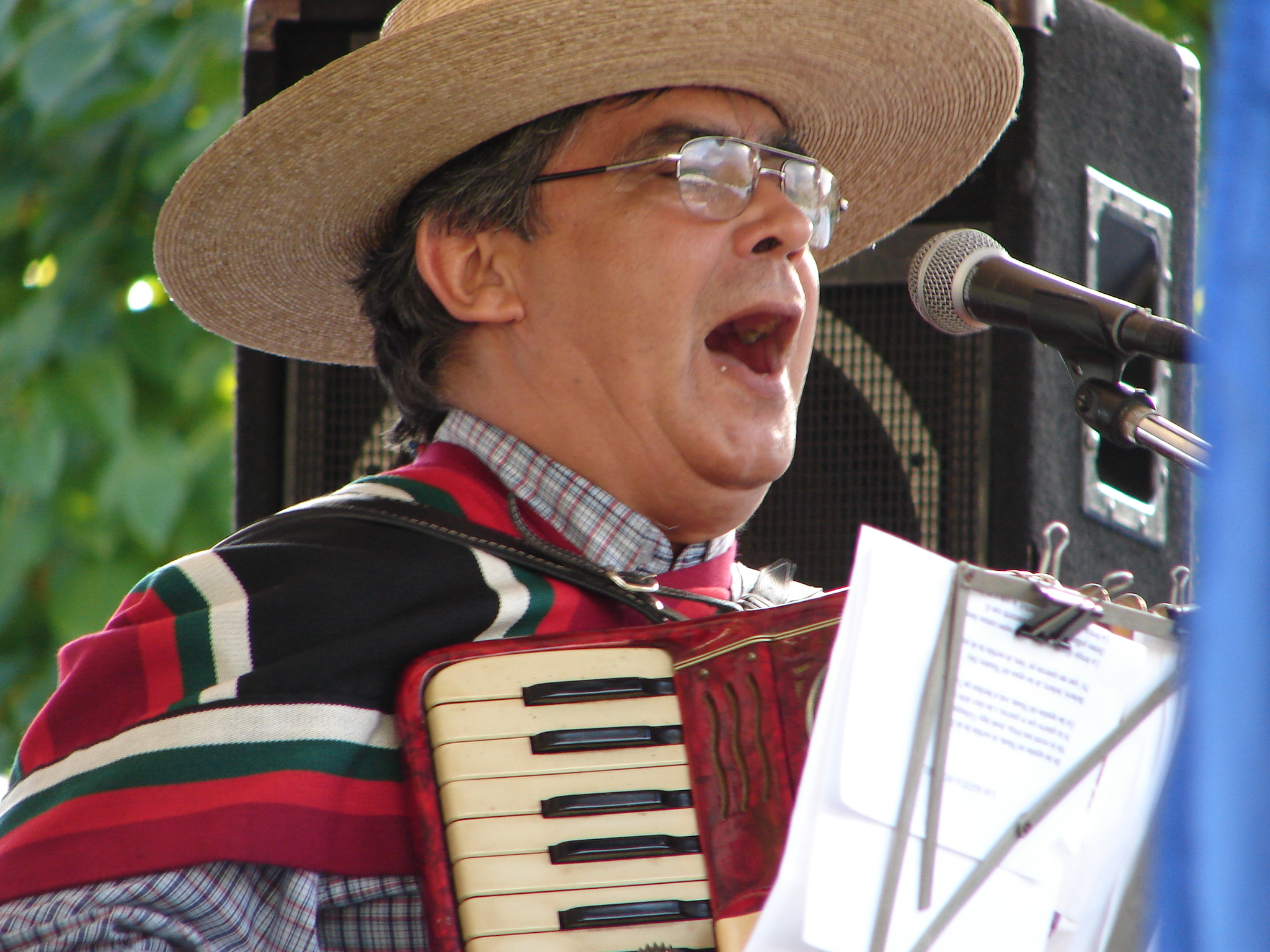
A Huaso folklorist sings the cueca (the Chilean national dance) during the Fiestas Patrias

During the Fiestas Patrias, customs and traditions typical of Chile’s national identity, known as chilenidad reemerge, many of which have survived historical changes.

Traditional games become popular once again. These include rodeos, carreras a la chilena (Chilean-style horse races) and horse breaking, palo ensebado (greased pole climbing) and rayuela tournaments, sack races, and pig-chasing competitions, among others. The springlike weather also allows kite flying (volantines) in much of the country.

The cueca, Chile’s national dance, is primarily danced during these celebrations. In fact, performing “un pie de cueca” is considered almost obligatory to inaugurate the Fiestas Patrias. However, the growing popularity of cumbia has led to a decline in the prominence of traditional dance music during these festivities.

It is customary to prepare traditional Chilean food and drinks during this period. Among the most popular dishes and beverages are empanadas, anticuchos, barbecued meats (asados), choripanes, and sopaipillas; as well as the terremoto (white pipeño wine or white wine with pineapple ice cream and a splash of cognac, fernet, grenadine, Chilean pisco, or rum), chicha (made from apples or grapes), piscola, and beer, among others. Chileans prepare these foods in their homes, or they go to fondas. Fondas are venues, often tents, prepared and decorated for the Fiestas Patrias where traditional Chilean dishes and beverages are served. The largest fondas are found in Parque O'Higgins. Each year the Chilean President kicks off the Fiestas Patrias celebrations at one of these locales. For many years, the selected fonda was La Grandiosa Bertita. The predominant food associated with the Fiestas Patrias are Chilean empanadas, which are a sort of bread pastry. The filling of these empanadas consist of pino, a mixture of chopped beef and onion, as well as half of a hard-boiled egg, and an olive. Many Chileans also throw a barbecue for the Fiestas Patrias. During this time sales of meat products exceed $50 million.

Many educational institutions, such as preschools, primary and secondary schools, technical training centers, professional institutes, and universities usually observe a week-long holiday coinciding with these celebrations. In addition, although it is not mandatory, it is very common in September for pensioners, public-sector employees, and private-sector workers to receive a monetary bonus known as the Fiestas Patrias aguinaldo. In the private sector, the amount depends on agreements established in collective labor contracts.

Until the mid-20th century, these festivities were characterized by certain rituals: people bought new clothes and shoes—a custom known as cacharpearse—houses were painted by municipal order, and Chilean flags were strictly displayed in courtyards and gardens, where there was often a designated place for flagpoles. The personal use of fireworks was also permitted and customary during celebrations; however, it is currently prohibited and allowed only as part of organized public displays.

Throughout September, traditionally known as the mes de la Patria (month of the Fatherland)—the circus, recognized as a manifestation of Chilean culture, extends what is known as the circus season. During this time, the main national circuses set up in major cities across the country and, once the season ends, travel to more remote areas of Chile.

== Local celebrations ==
During the War of the Pacific (1879–1884), Chilean army troops on campaign organized celebrations of 18 September in enemy territory. At the Tacna camp in 1880,

se tocó diana por las bandas, y la Canción Nacional al izarse la bandera, y se asistió a una misa de campaña. [En el rancho hubo] asados y empanadas [y los oficiales] improvisaron varios pequeños banquetes en los que se pronunciaron muchos brindis por la lejana patria [... En la tarde hubo] divertidísimas funciones de títeres y de acróbatas; y se bailaron animadas cuecas», mientras que en Lima en 1882, «a las 2 P. M., hubo un Te-Deum en la plaza principal [y] un desfile [...] En la noche hubo un banquete en el palacio de los virreyes, al que asistieron los jefes. Los oficiales y la tropa tuvimos nuestro banquetito en los cuarteles. Y al día siguiente se efectuó la tradicional parada militar [a las doce en Malambo, barrio ultra Rimac]

"the reveille was sounded by the bands, and the National Song was played as the flag was raised, followed by a field mass. [At the mess there were] roasts and empanadas, [and the officers] improvised several small banquets at which many toasts were made to the distant homeland [… In the afternoon there were] very entertaining puppet and acrobat performances, and lively cuecas were danced,” while in Lima in 1882, “at 2 p.m. there was a Te Deum in the main square [and] a parade […] In the evening there was a banquet at the palace of the viceroys, attended by the commanders. The officers and troops had our own small banquet in the barracks. And the following day the traditional military parade was held [at noon in Malambo, a neighborhood beyond the Rímac]"

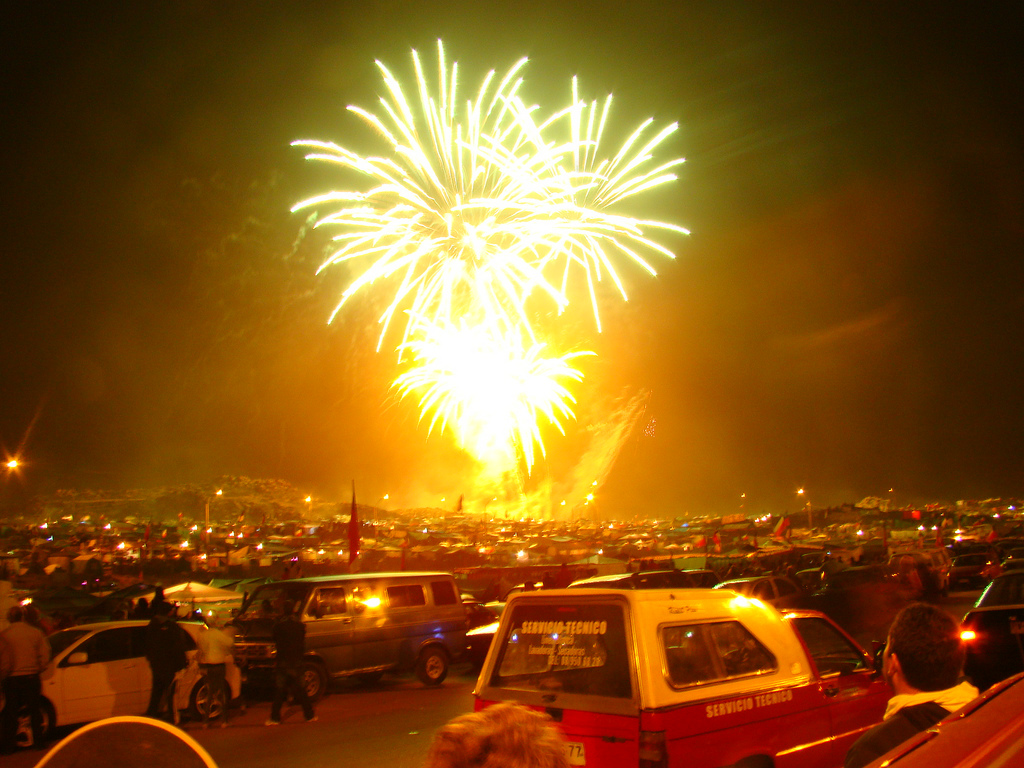
Pampilla Festival in Coquimbo, 2012

The Fiesta de la Pampilla is the most mass-attended celebration of the Fiestas Patrias. Tradition holds that, due to the distance between Coquimbo and the Chilean capital (460 km), news of the establishment of the First Government Junta in 1810 arrived on 20 September. However, it is more likely that, after the reduction of the Fiestas Patrias to 18 and 19 September by Law No. 2977 of 1915, the residents of Coquimbo continued the custom of celebrating until that date.

Since the mid-20th century, 20 September has been a de facto public holiday in the Coquimbo Region, and in 2014, 2016, and 2017 it was a legal public holiday throughout the region. Its popularity has grown to the point that it has begun to be celebrated in other localities in northern Chile. This traditional celebration reduced its activities due to the 2015 Coquimbo earthquake and was suspended as a result of the COVID-19 pandemic in 2020.

In Santiago, since 1995, the Federation of Chilean Horse Breeders (Federación Criadores de Caballos Raza Chilena) and the municipalities of La Reina, Las Condes, Providencia, and Vitacura have organized the “Semana de la Chilenidad” at Padre Hurtado Park, whose main objective is to highlight the culture, traditions, and values of the Chilean countryside, especially those associated with the huaso and his horse.

Meanwhile, on Easter Island, hare mauku, a type of ramada are erected, and a parade by members of the Armed Forces stationed there is held. In Curicó, Maule Region, it is customary on 19 September to climb Cerro Condell, where fondas are set up; and in Cochrane, Aysén Region, the “Pioneers’ Lunch” (Almuerzo de los pioneros) takes place.

Outside Chile, the Festival Chile, organized by the Chile Cultural Corporation and sponsored by the Chilean consulate in Washington, D.C., has been held for the Chilean community in the District of Columbia and surrounding areas since the late 1990s. Likewise, other Chilean communities organize celebrations of the Fiestas Patrias in their countries of residence.

== Tributes ==
In September 1910, the Brazilian government declared 18 September a public holiday in Brazil on the occasion of the Centenary of Chile: “The government of the United States of Brazil has informed its minister in Santiago, His Excellency Mr. Gómez Ferreira, that by federal decree 18 September next has been declared a holiday, in tribute to the cordial friendship that unites that republic with ours.” This gesture was reciprocated by the government of Arturo Alessandri on the occasion of the Centenary of Brazil on 7 September 1922.

Since September 2008, the Google search engine has published a Google Doodle on its homepage to commemorate Chile’s Fiestas Patrias.

In September 2019, two buildings in the United Arab Emirates, the Burj Khalifa, the tallest structure ever recorded in history, and the ADNOC Tower displayed the Chilean flag on their façades. Likewise, the building of the Federation of Industries of the State of São Paulo in Brazil, in addition to the flag, displayed images of Chile.

== Cultural aspects ==
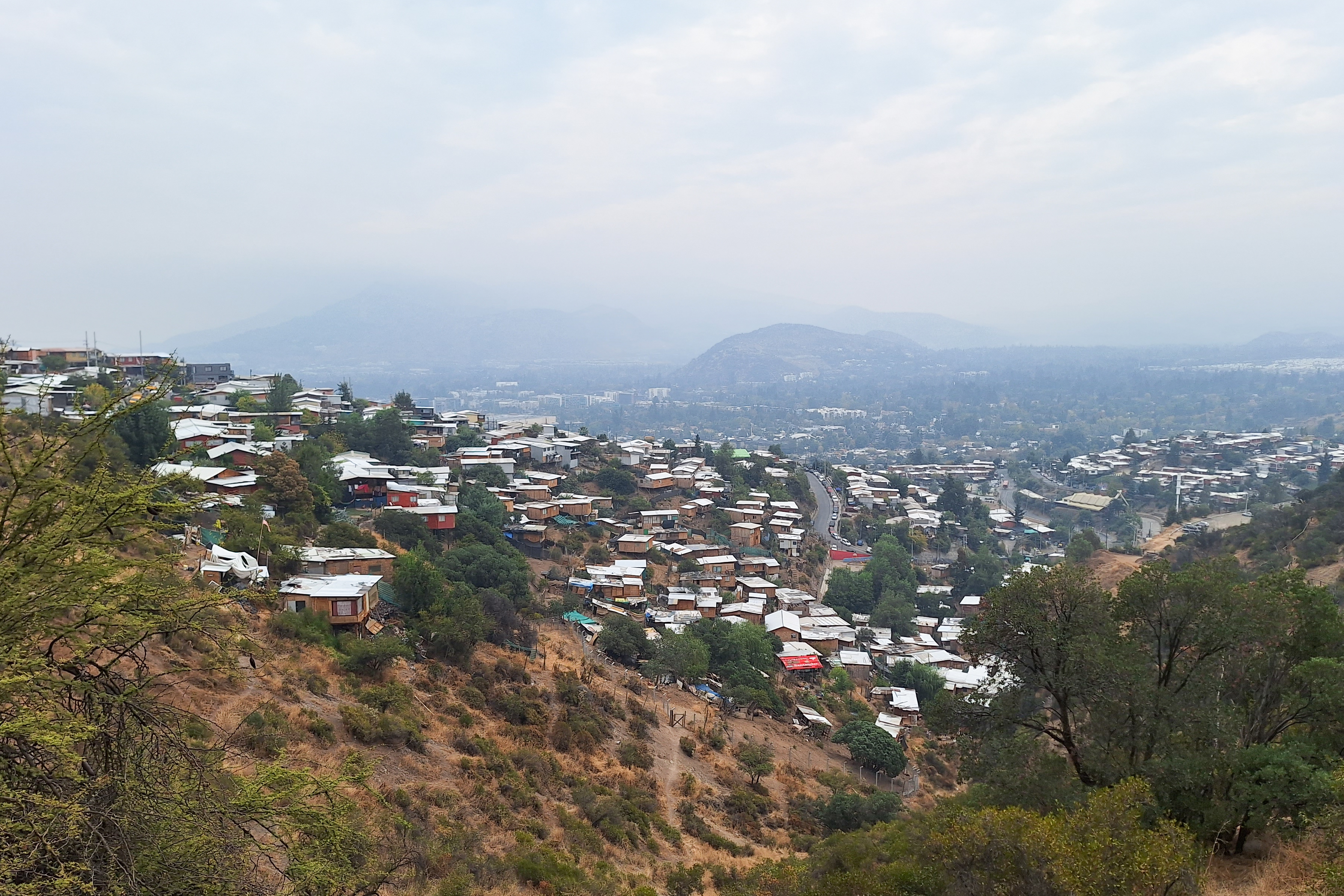
Cerro Dieciocho, Lo Barnechea, Santiago (2024)

Juan Bello Dunn (1825–1860) wrote “El Dieciocho de Setiembre [sic]”, a dissertation preceded by sixteen verses that won a prize in the competition organized by the Literary Society on the occasion of the Fiestas Patrias of 1842. Luis Rodríguez Velasco composed his first poem, “Al dieziocho [sic] de septiembre”, which was published in El Correo Literario in 1858.

In the commune of Lo Barnechea is located Cerro 18, or Cerro Dieciocho (1,020 m), originally named “Cerro 18 de Septiembre” in homage to the date of the establishment of the First National Government Junta.

These celebrations have also been the subject of documentary short films such as Festejos en el Parque Cousiño (1910) and Gran revista militar en el Parque Cousiño (1910), as well as numerous cuecas. Notable examples include “Cueca para el 18” and “Dieciocho de Septiembre” by “Lalo” and Lautaro Parra; “Llegaron las fiestas patrias” by Germán del Campo; and “Viva el dieciocho'e setiembre [sic]”, a popular and traditional cueca of Chilean folklore performed by Rosario Quilodrán.

In colloquial Chilean Spanish, several terms derived from the date 18 September are used, including the noun el Dieciocho” and the adjectives “dieciochero, -a” ("someone who enthusiastically celebrates the national holidays”) and “endieciochado, -a” (“someone who is cheerful on account of the patriotic celebration of 18 September” or “someone who is drunk or intoxicated”).

== Effects ==
The Fiestas Patrias are important dates both for consumption, primarily of meat and related products, and for domestic tourism. With regard to consumption, September is the second month with the highest sales, after December. On average, household consumption in Chile is estimated to increase by between 15% and 35% compared with a typical week. With respect to tourism, during the Fiestas Patrias weekend celebrations in September 2025, 1,050,000 vehicles left the Metropolitan Region of Santiago.

On the other hand, these festivities also record some of the highest figures for mortality due to traffic accidents, usually as a result of alcohol or drug consumption, primarily marijuana and cocaine, as well as speeding. During the 2025 Fiestas Patrias, 563 accidents were recorded, resulting in 415 injured persons and 23 fatalities.

== Gallery ==
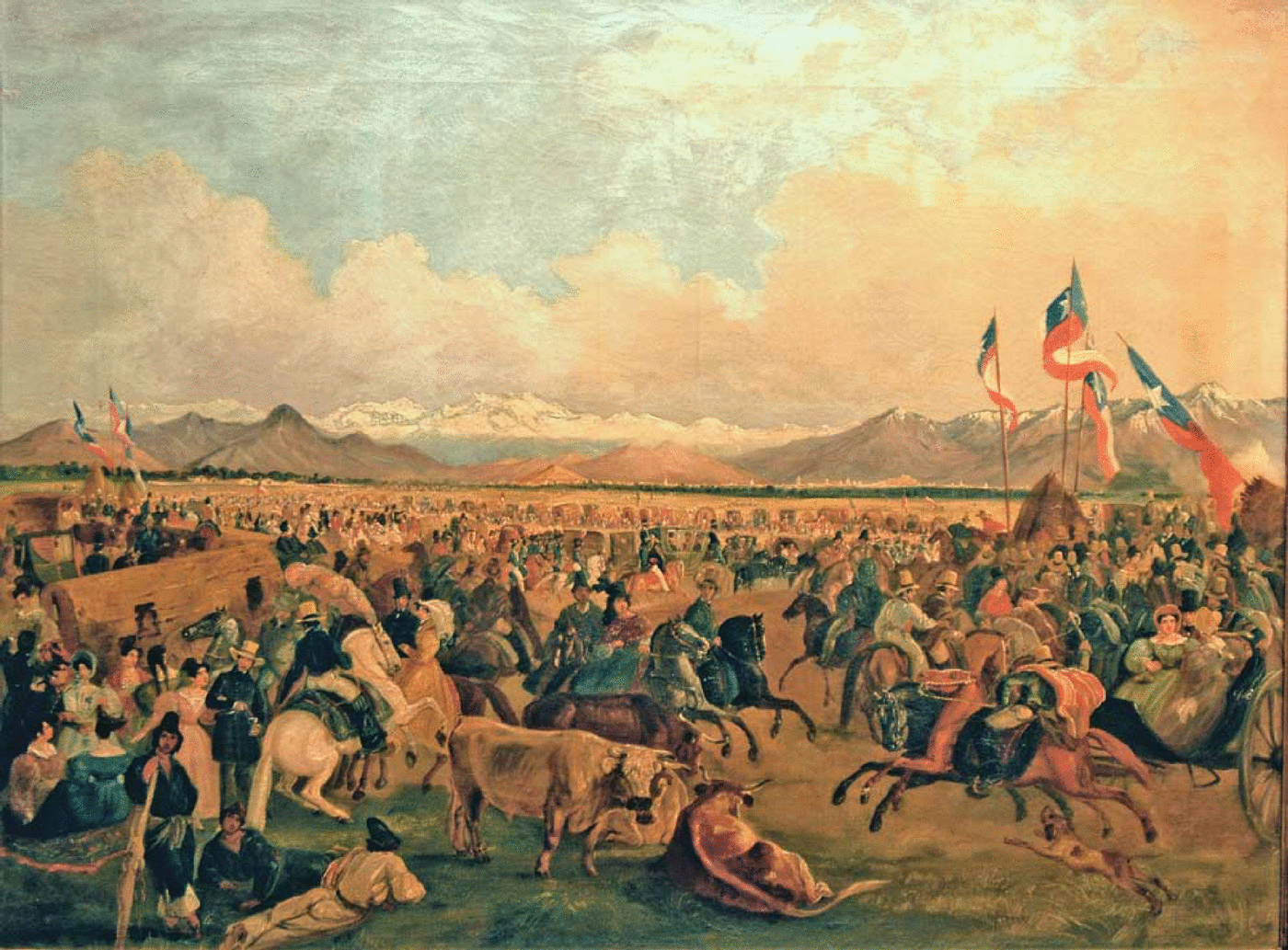
September 19, by Johann Moritz Rugendas, 1837

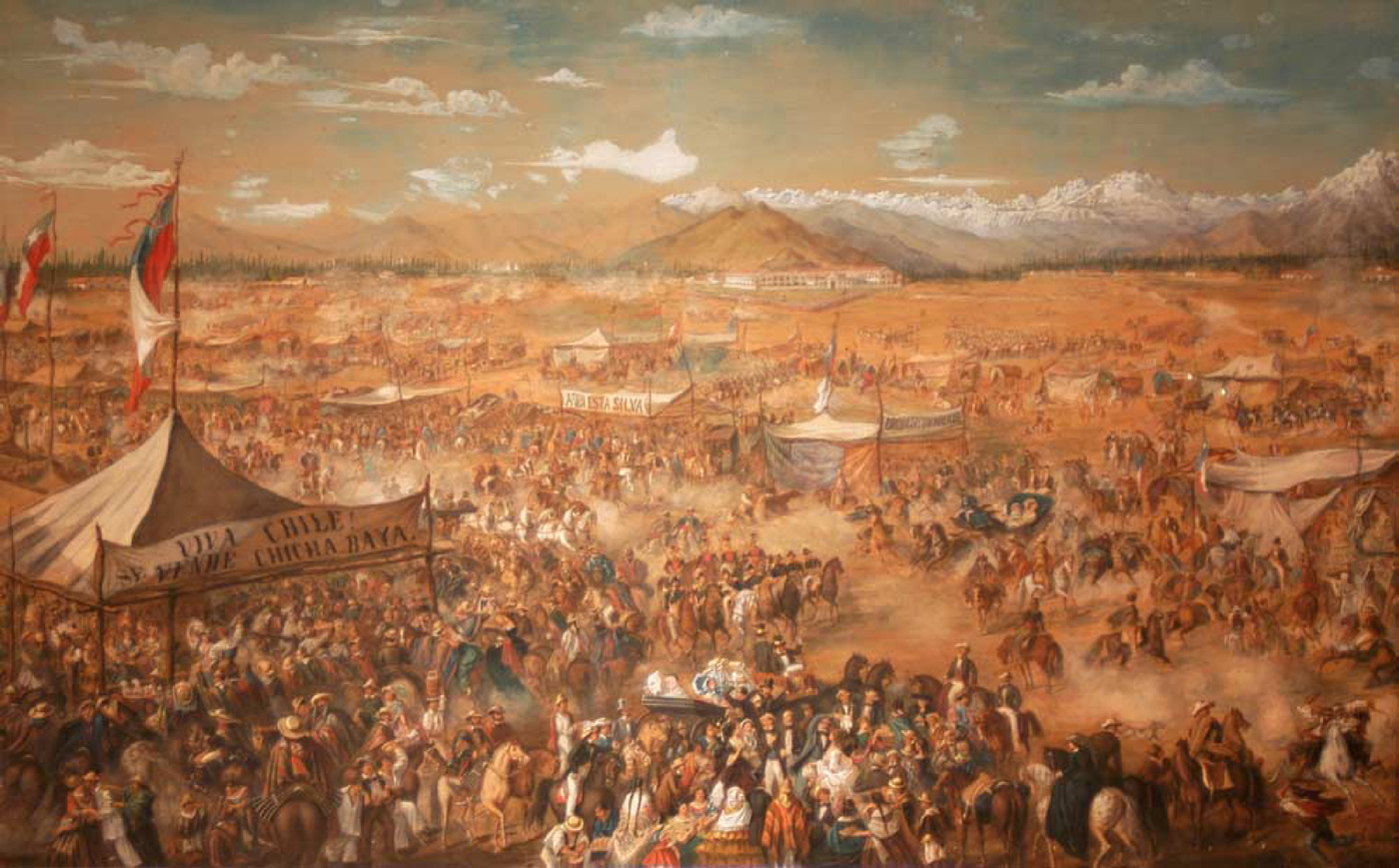
Ernest Charton's oil painting September the 18th in Santiago, 1845

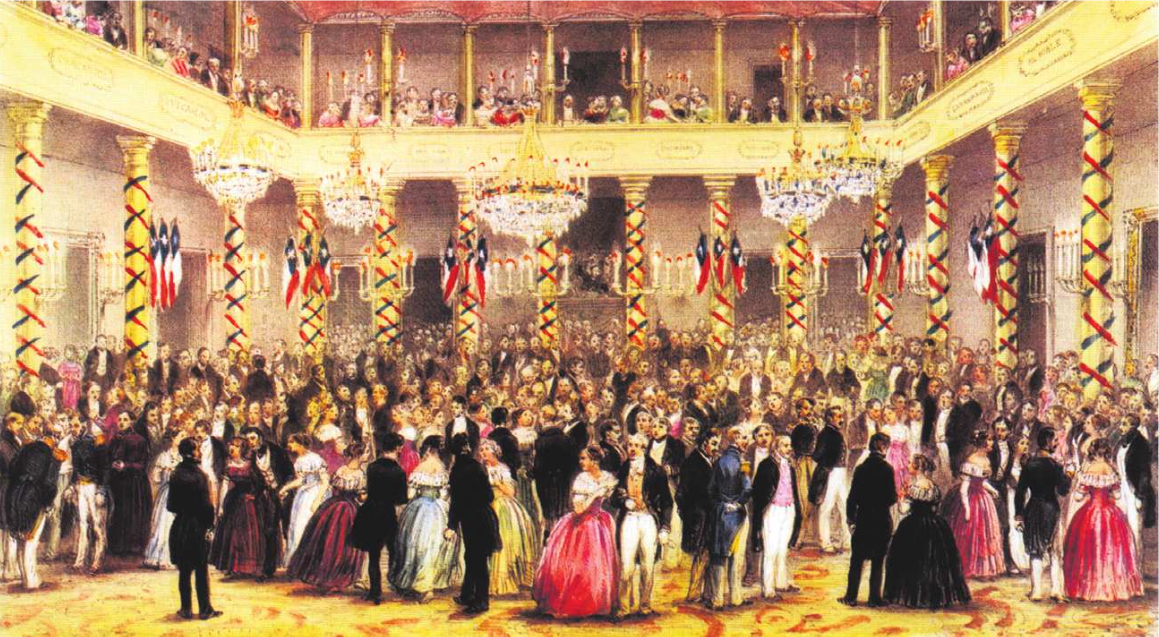
September 18, by Claudio Gay, 1854

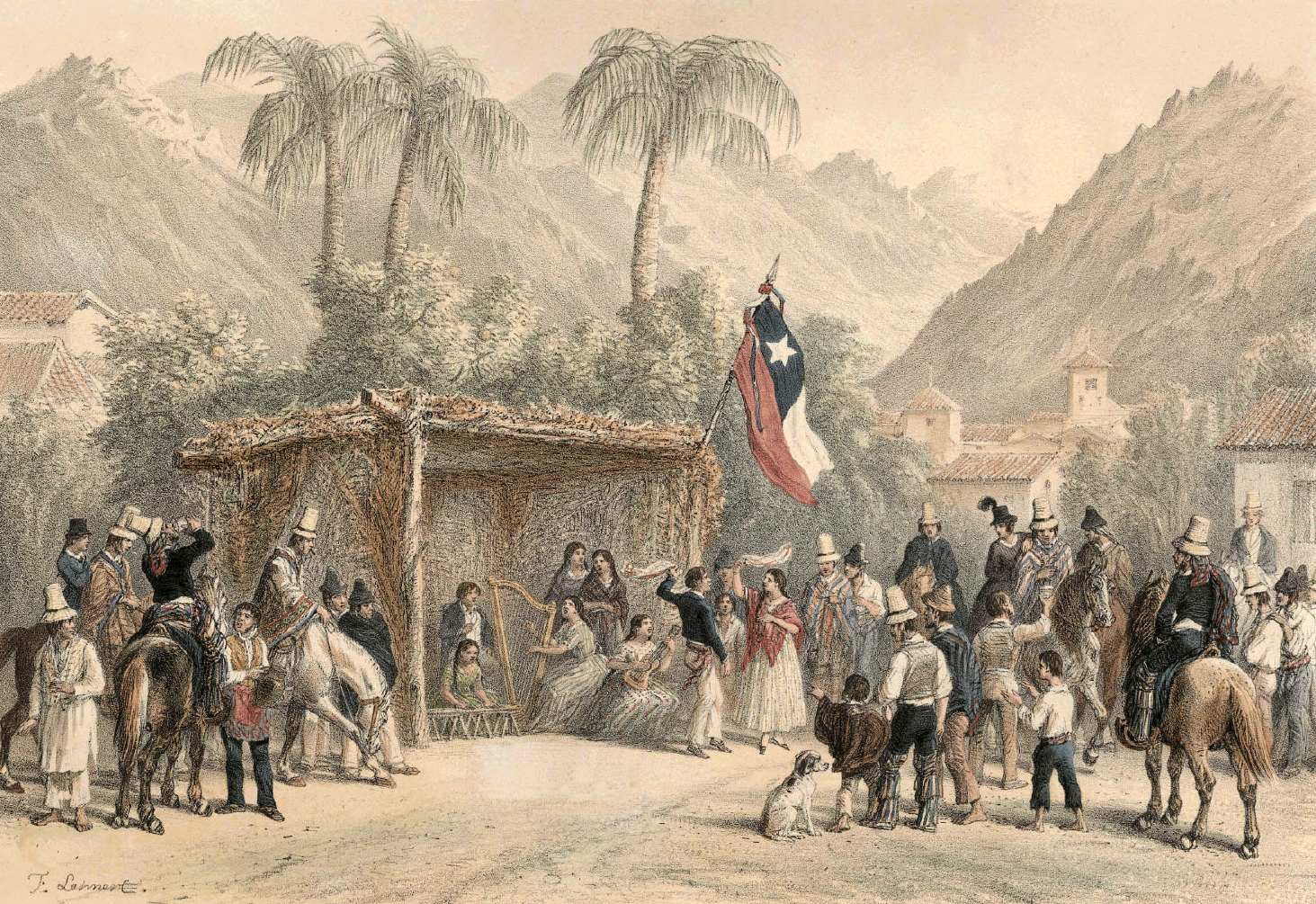
Claudio Gay, Una Chingana, 1854
