= Fondas =

Food venues in Chile

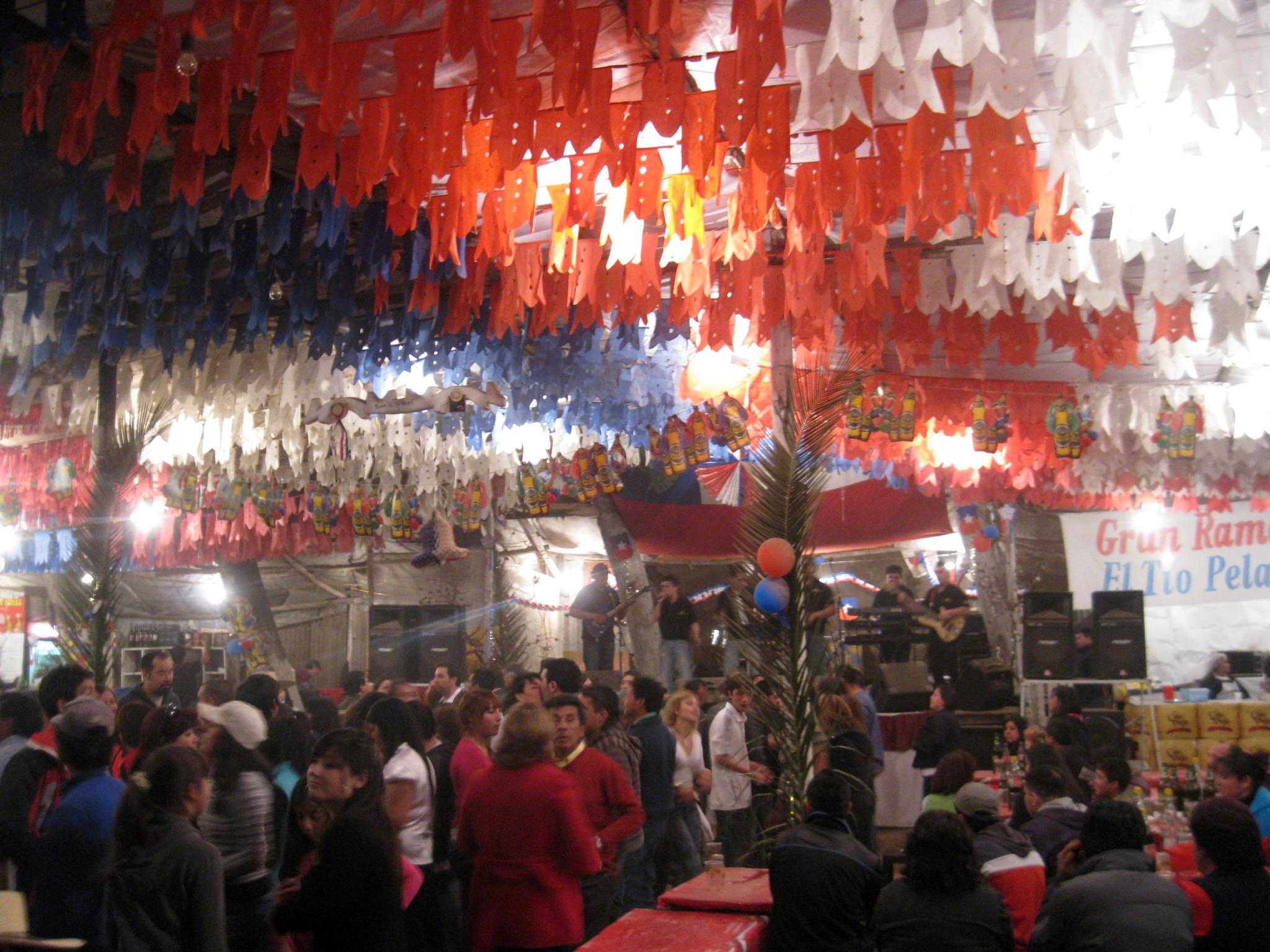
Fonda in Calera de Tango, Chile.

Fondas, also known as ramadas or chinganas, are temporary establishments in Chile that emerge during the Fiestas Patrias, a national celebration held in September. These venues offer a wide array of food and beverages to the public. One of the most renowned fondas is La Grandiosa Bertita, situated in O'Higgins Park, Santiago, Chile.

Fondas are found throughout towns and cities across Chile and serve as hubs for Chilean folkloric culture. Visitors can experience traditional music, participate in the cueca dance, and witness the thrilling Chilean rodeo, held in the "Media Luna" arena. Attendees often dress as huasos, wearing straw hats and ponchos.

Traditional cuisine and beverages play a significant role in fondas, featuring dishes like mote con huesillo (a sweet drink made with wheat and dried peaches), anticuchos (meat skewers), and terremotos (a cocktail composed of pipeño wine, grenadine, and pineapple ice cream). Additionally, fondas offer various games and activities, including dart throwing, ring tossing to land on a beverage, and fishing pools for children to win prizes.
