= 2012 Concertación municipal primaries =

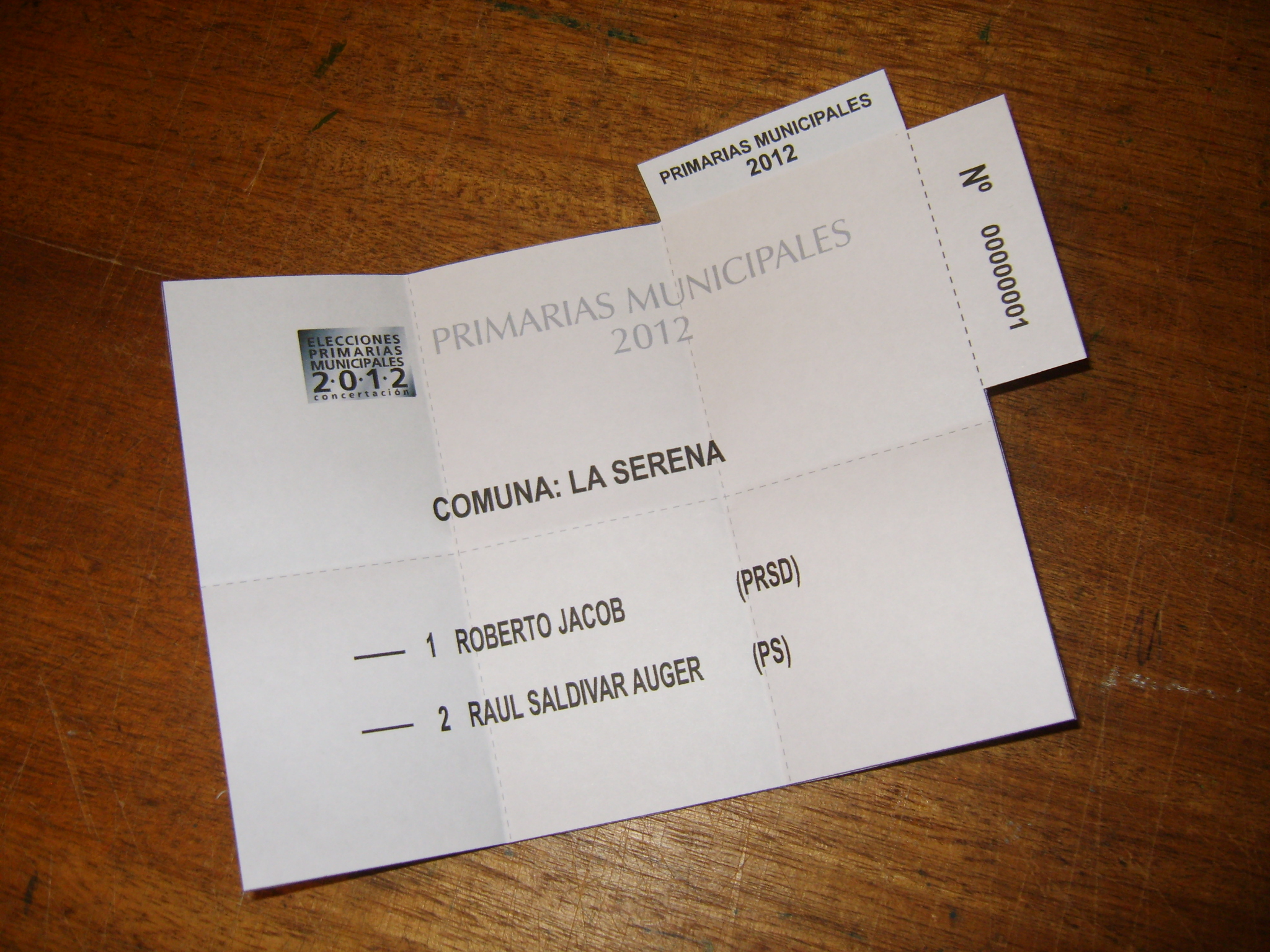
Ballot paper used in the La Serena primaries

The Concertación primaries for Chile's 2012 municipal elections were held nationwide on 1 April 2012. Around 313,000 people voted across 142 communes, selecting 142 candidates from 335 pre-candidates to represent the coalition.

Following the Concertación's defeat in the 2009–2010 presidential election, the coalition's primaries were described as "defective and restricted." The coalition later set a date for municipal primaries to select its candidates for the October 2012 elections.

In the Santiago Metropolitan Region commune of Providencia, the Concertación primaries were delayed until 13 May, with three candidates participating. Josefa Errázuriz was ultimately chosen to challenge incumbent mayor Cristián Labbé in the October elections.

== General results ==
#	Party		Pre-candidates	Elected candidates	Votes	Percentage
1	Christian Democrat Party	PDC	103	50	106,232	33.85%
2	Party for Democracy	PPD	82	35	81,273	25.89%
3	Socialist Party	PS	90	35	83,919	26.74%
4	Social Democrat Radical Party	PRSD	43	13	26,845	8.55%
5	Independent		17	6	15,548	4.95%
Total			335	142	313,817	100%

== Results in selected communes ==
=== Arica y Parinacota Region ===
==== Putre ====
Candidate	Party	Votes	%	Result
Ángelo Carrasco Arias	PPD	364	63.08%	Candidate
Miguel Saavedra Palma	PDC	213	36.92%	

=== Tarapacá Region ===
==== Colchane ====
Candidate	Party	Votes	%	Result
Doris Mamani	Ind.	81	58.70%	Candidate
Vicente García Mamani	PS	57	41.30%	

=== Antofagasta Region ===
==== Antofagasta ====
Candidate	Party	Votes	%	Result
Marcela Hernando	Ind.	3,519	64.60%	Candidate
Andrea Merino	PS	1,928	35.40%	

=== Atacama Region ===
==== Copiapó ====
Candidate	Party	Votes	%	Result
Marcos López Rivera	Ind.	3,459	69.24%	Candidate
René Navarro Albiña	PRSD	288	5.76%	
Francisco Madero Santana	PS	1,249	25.00%	

=== Coquimbo Region ===
==== Coquimbo ====
Candidate	Party	Votes	%	Result
Oscar Pereira Tapia	PDC	4,277	75.43%	Candidate
Ramón Velásquez Seguel	PPD	1,393	24.57%	

Oscar Pereira died on 6 July 2012. The Christian Democrat Party appointed Cristian Galleguillos as their new candidate.

==== La Serena ====
Candidate	Party	Votes	%	Result
Roberto Jacob Jure	PRSD	4,012	54.19%	Candidate
Raúl Saldívar Auger	PS	3,392	45.81%	

=== Valparaíso Region ===
==== Valparaíso ====
Candidate	Party	Votes	%	Result
Hernán Pinto	PDC	5,255	54.46%	Candidate
Paula Quintana	PS	4,394	45.54%	

=== Santiago Metropolitan Region ===
==== Maipú ====
Candidate	Party	Votes	%	Result
Christian Vittori	PDC	2,709	58.62%	Candidate
Hernán Calderón	PS	603	13.05%	
Carol Bontinick	PPD	1,309	28.33%	

==== Santiago ====
Candidate	Party	Votes	%	Result
Carolina Tohá	PPD	1,950	67.33%	Candidate
Ismael Calderón	PS	178	6.15%	
Laura Albornoz	PDC	768	26.52%	

==== La Florida ====
Candidate	Party	Votes	%	Result
Gonzalo Duarte	PDC	2,416	45.23%	Candidate
Viviene Bachelet	Ind.	1,197	22.41%	
Víctor Barrueto	PPD	1,728	32.35%	

==== Providencia ====
Held on 13 May.

Candidate	Party	Votes	%	Result
Cristóbal Bellolio	Ind.	1,297	35.7%	
Javier Insulza	PS	857	23.6%	
Josefa Errázuriz	Ind.	1,444	39.7%	Candidate

=== O'Higgins Region ===
==== Rancagua ====
Candidate	Party	Votes	%	Result
Carlos Arellano Baeza	PDC	1,470	45.81%	Candidate
Claudio Sule Fernández	Ind.	424	13.21%	
Edison Ortiz González	PS	536	16.70%	
Raúl Guíñez Martínez	PPD	779	24.28%	

==== Pichilemu ====
Ballot number	Candidate	Party	Votes	%	Result
1	Roberto Córdova Carreño	PS	1,903	73.14%	Candidate
2	Andrea Aranda Escudero	PPD	699	26.86%	
	Total votes		2,602	100.00%	

=== Maule Region ===
==== Talca ====
Candidate	Party	Votes	%	Result
Alexis Sepúlveda	PRSD	4,585	69.38%	Candidate
Jaime Gazmuri	PS	1,393	30.62%	

=== Biobío Region ===
==== Hualpén ====
Candidate	Party	Votes	%	Result
Miguel Vera	PDC	1,338	35.98%	
Luis Chamorro	PS	361	9.71%	
Fabiola Lagos	PPD	2,020	54.31%	Candidate

==== La Araucanía Region ====
===== Padre Las Casas =====
Candidate	Party	Votes	%	Result
Mario González Rebolledo	PRSD	742	60.62%	Candidate
Ana María Soto	PPD	482	39.38%	

=== Los Ríos Region ===
==== Valdivia ====
Candidate	Party	Votes	%	Result
Carlos Atmann Moyano	PDC	1,646	77.06%	Candidate
Marcos Cortez Muñoz	Ind.	490	22.94%	

=== Los Lagos Region ===
==== Puerto Montt ====
Candidate	Party	Votes	%	Result
Juan Cárcamo	PDC	1,044	25.50%	
Gervoy Paredes	PS	1,913	46.73%	Candidate
Gonzalo Pineda	Ind.	1,137	27.77%	

=== Magallanes y la Antártica Chilena Region ===
==== Punta Arenas ====
Candidate	Party	Votes	%	Result
Emilio Boccazzi	Ind.	3,952	46.81%	Candidate
Emilio Jiménez	PS	558	6.61%	
Juan Morano	PDC	3,932	46.58%	
