= Octavio Errázuriz =

Chilean lawyer and diplomat

Octavio Errazuriz Guilisasti
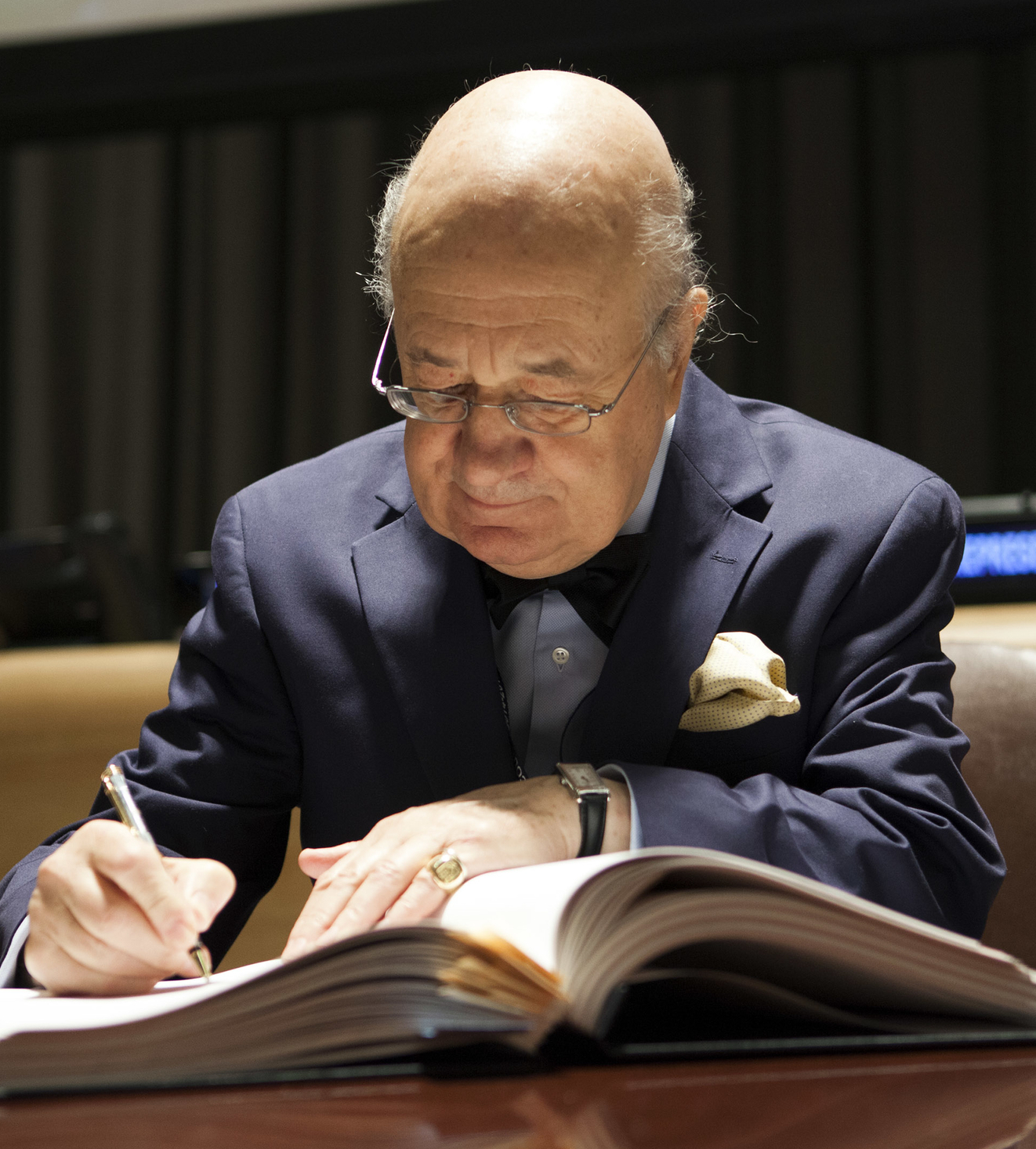

Ambassador of Chile to the Holy See
- In office Sep 18, 2018 – March 11, 2022
- President: Sebastián Piñera Echenique
- Preceded by: Mónica Jiménez de la Jara

Ambassador of Chile to the United Nations
- In office March 11, 2010 – March 11, 2014
- President: Sebastián Piñera Echenique
- Preceded by: Heraldo Muñoz Valenzuela
- Succeeded by: Christian Barros Melet

Personal details
- Born: Octavio Errazuriz Guilisasti Chile Santiago, Chile
- Spouse: Argentine Cristina Tortorelli
- Children: 2
- Relatives: Virginia Errázuriz (sister), Josefa Errázuriz (brother)
- Education: University of Chile
- Occupation: Lawyer

Octavio Errázuriz Guilisasti is a Chilean lawyer and diplomat. He is the former ambassador of Chile to the United Nations and a former Chilean ambassador to the Holy See.

== Early life and education ==
He studied law at the University of Chile, and later took courses at the School of Foreign Affairs and Government of the University of Virginia, in the United States. He is the son of Octavio Errázuriz Letelier and his wife Virginia Guilisasti Tagle. He is the brother of Virginia Errázuriz, a visual artist, and of Josefa Errázuriz, former mayor of the Providencia district.

Errázuriz is married to the Argentine Cristina Tortorelli, with whom he has two daughters.

== Career ==
Between 1963 and 2001 Errázuriz served in the Foreign Service of Chile. After that, he was appointed adviser to the presidency of the Copesa. He was also president of the extension of the Universidad San Sebastián between 2014 and 2018 and was a member of the Public Policy Council of Libertad y Desarrollo and the advisory council for the Center for International Studies of the Universidad Católica.

He was the ambassador of Chile to Ecuador between 1985 and 1988, to the United States between 1989 and 1990, and to China between 1997 and 2000.

At the Ministry of Foreign Affairs, he held, among other positions, director general of foreign policy, adviser for Pacific affairs, and director of Asia-Pacific and Oceania.

As Chile's representative in Washington DC, he had to face the diplomatic conflict that was triggered between the two countries by the detection of two grapes contaminated with cyanide in March 1989.

In 2010 he was appointed ambassador to the United Nations by President Sebastián Piñera, after being considered a representative in Brazil. He stepped down in 2014. In May 2018, President Piñera appointed him as a representative to the Holy See.
