= La Grandiosa Bertita =

La Grandiosa Bertita is a Chilean fonda that is set up during the Fiestas Patrias (National Holidays) in O'Higgins Park in Santiago, Chile. Its significance lies in the fact that for seven years (2000, 2002, 2004, 2005, 2006, 2011, and 2012), it was selected to inaugurate the city's traditional ramadas (festive pavilions) in a ceremony attended by authorities such as the President of Chile and the Mayor of the Santiago municipality, earning it the title of "official fonda of O'Higgins Park."

Owned by Berta Brito and her husband, Luis Villarroel, this fonda has been in operation since approximately 1958. Since 1979, it has been situated in O'Higgins Park, making it one of the oldest fondas in Santiago and earning it nationwide prestige. The only year it did not operate was in 1973 due to the September 11th coup d'état. The success of this fonda allowed its owner to embark on various parallel projects, such as opening a restaurant in the Lo Valledor fair.

During the opening of the fonda on September 15, 2006, the tradition of the President of Chile dancing the cueca, which had reportedly been dormant since the government of Gabriel González Videla, was revived when President Michelle Bachelet performed the dance with the Mayor of Santiago, Raúl Alcaíno.

Between 2007 and 2010, La Grandiosa Bertita was not selected as the official fonda, as the bidding process initiated by the Municipality of Santiago was won by the fonda Iorana, which emerged as one of its main competitors. However, in 2011, it regained the bid and was inaugurated by President Sebastián Piñera.

In 2013, La Grandiosa Bertita was unable to hold the fonda in O'Higgins Park. Nevertheless, this did not hinder the continuation of the fonda tradition, as it was relocated to El Trapiche Park in the commune of Peñaflor.
