= 2012 Chilean municipal election =

Chilean election

A municipal election took place in Chile on 28 October 2012. The newly elected mayors and councilmen will begin their term on 6 December 2012.

This was the first election carried out under a new law in which all potential voters were automatically enrolled and in which voting was made voluntary.

== Results ==
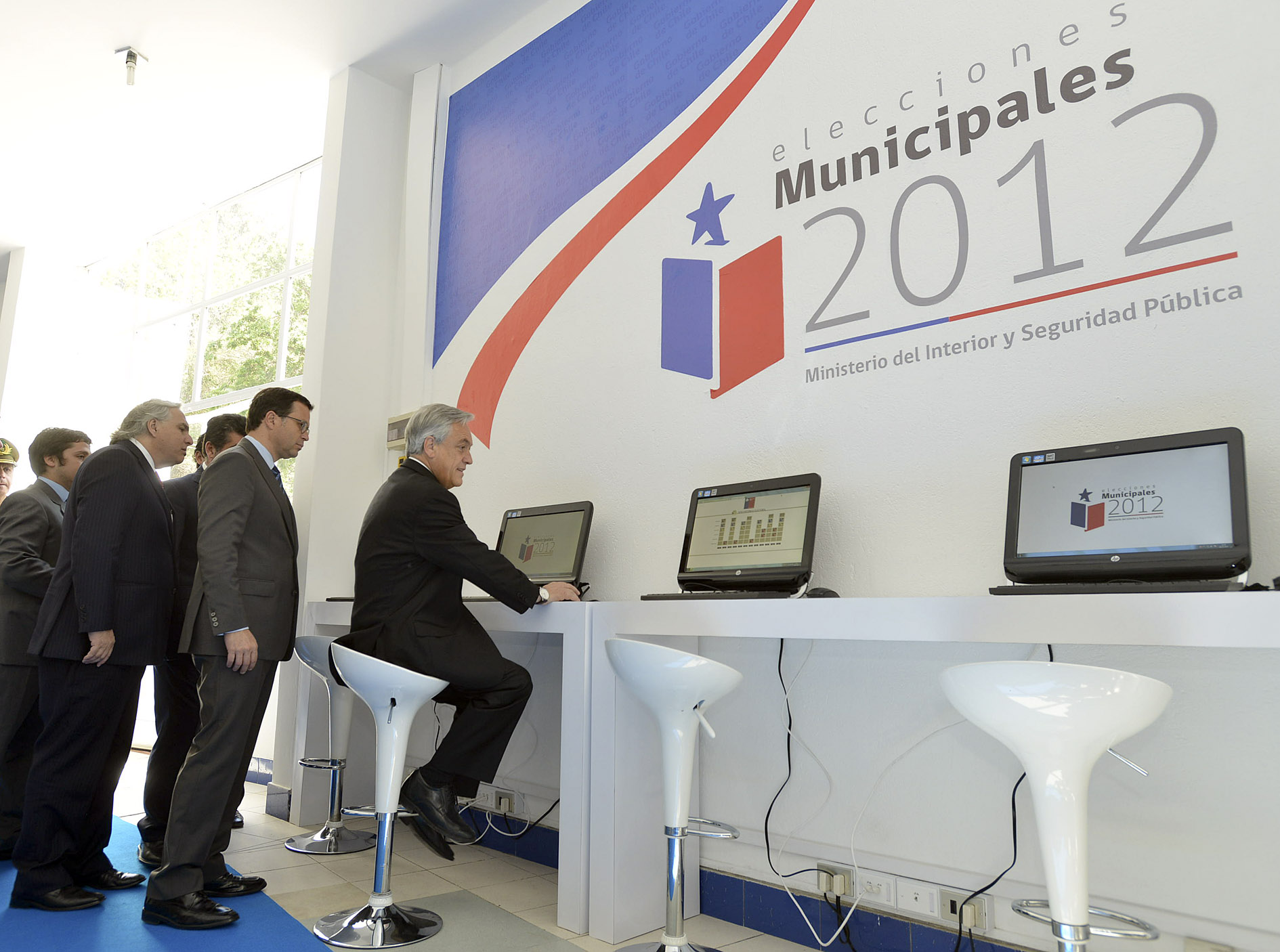
Election press headquarters at Teatro La Cúpula in O'Higgins Park, Santiago.

=== Mayoral election ===
Preliminary results with 95.24% of polling stations counted.

List/Party	Votes	%	Candidates	Elected
List A - Igualdad Para Chile	36,336	0.69	23	0
Partido Igualdad	19,034	0.36	12	0
Independents List A	17,302	0.32	11	0
List B - Regionalistas e Independientes	126,510	2.40	67	5
Partido Regionalista de los Independientes	39,958	0.75	28	2
Independents List B	86,552	1.64	39	3
List C - El Cambio Por Tí	155,964	2.96	77	7
Partido Progresista	83,558	1.58	44	3
Partido Ecologista Verde	142	0.00	1	0
Independents List C	72,264	1.37	32	4
List D - Chile Está en Otra	9,776	0.18	5	0
Chileprimero	123	0.00	1	0
Independents List D	9,653	0.18	4	0
List E - Por un Chile Justo	720,865	13.70	112	62
Partido Comunista de Chile	72,784	1.38	7	4
Partido por la Democracia	346,893	6.59	61	37
Partido Radical Socialdemócrata	174,340	3.31	27	13
Independents List E	126,848	2.41	17	8
List F - Concertación Democrática	1,546,773	29.40	225	106
Partido Demócrata Cristiano	865,278	16.44	120	55
Partido Socialista de Chile	519,373	9.87	70	31
Independents List F	162,122	3.08	35	20
List G - Más Humanos	82,666	1.57	54	3
Partido Humanista	33,144	0.62	25	1
Movimiento Amplio Social	30,449	0.57	8	1
Independents List G	19,073	0.36	21	1
List H - Coalición	1,971,651	37.47	333	121
Unión Demócrata Independiente	946,742	17.99	131	47
Renovación Nacional	621,915	11.82	118	40
Independents List H	402,994	7.65	84	34
List I - Por el Desarrollo del Norte	33,864	0.64	2	1
Independents List I	33,864	0.64	2	1
Independents (out of pact)	576,664	10.96	261	40
Valid votes	5,261,069	100.00		
Null votes	148,726			
Blank votes	86,134			
Total votes	5,495,929			
Total voters enrolled	13,404,084	43.05% turnout (est.)		
Voting age population	12,835,981	104.43% registered		

=== Councilmen election ===
Preliminary results with 76.95% of polling stations counted.

List/Party	Votes	%	Candidates	Elected
List A - Igualdad Para Chile	33,361	0.81	135	1
List B - Regionalistas e Independientes	312,651	7.63	1,514	136
List C - El Cambio Por Tí	184,830	4.51	960	46
List D - Chile Está en Otra	5,990	0.14	37	1
List E - Por un Chile Justo	905,092	22.10	2,085	499
PPD e Independientes	407,088	9.94	793	269
PRSD e Independientes	234,800	5.73	718	128
PCCH + IC e Independientes	263,204	6.42	574	102
List F - Concertación Democrática	1,120,472	27.36	2,126	663
PDC e Independientes	618,996	15.11	1,095	387
PS e Independientes	501,476	12.24	1,031	276
List G - Más Humanos	125,215	3.05	671	31
PH e Independientes	76,487	1.86	458	19
MAS e Independientes	48,728	1.19	213	12
List H - Coalición	1,349,211	32.94	2,209	833
RN e Independientes	643,269	15.70	1,101	407
UDI e Independientes	705,942	17.24	1,108	426
List I - Por el Desarrollo del Norte	18,476	0.45	27	6
Independents (out of pact)	39,434	0.96	134	6
Valid votes	4,094,732	100.00		
Null votes	187,759			
Blank votes	140,434			
Total votes	4,422,925			
Total voters enrolled	13,404,084	42.88% turnout (est.)		
Voting age population	12,835,981	104.43% registered		

== See also ==
- 2012 Concertación municipal primaries
