= Josefa Errázuriz =

Chilean politician

Josefa Errazuriz Guilisasti
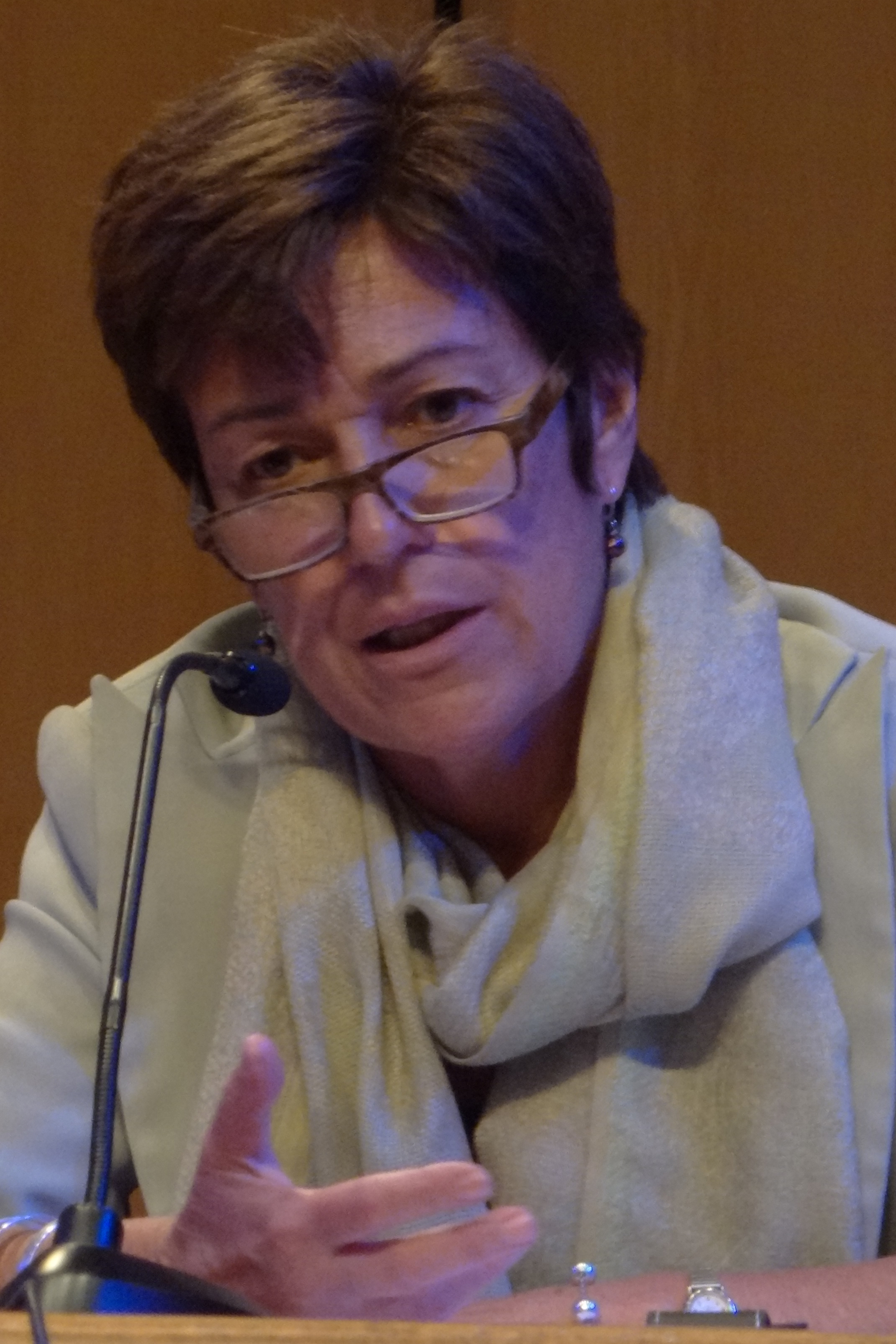
- Josefa Errázuriz in 2013.

Councilwoman of Providencia
- Incumbent
- Assumed office June 28, 2021

Mayor of Providencia
- In office December 6, 2012 – December 6, 2016
- Preceded by: Cristián Labbé Galilea
- Succeeded by: Evelyn Matthei Fornet

Personal details
- Born: Santiago, Chile
- Party: Independent
- Relatives: Octavio Errázuriz Guilisasti, Virginia Errázuriz Guilisasti
- Education: University of Chile
- Occupation: Political
- Website: josefaerrazuriz.cl

María Josefa Errázuriz Guilisasti, also known as "Pepa" Errázuriz, is a Chilean politician. She was mayor of Providencia between 2012 and 2016. She currently serves as councilor of the same commune since 2021.

== Early life and education ==
She studied at the Villa María Academy in Santiago, from where she graduated in 1969. Later, she studied sociology at the University of Chile. She is the daughter of the married couple made up of Octavio Errázuriz Letelier and Virginia Guilisasti Tagle. She is the sister of Octavio Errázuriz, ambassador to his country's the United States between 1989 and 1990, and Virginia Errázuriz, visual artist, and cousin of businessman and union leader Rafael Guilisasti.

== Career ==
Josefa has worked in towns organizing and managing youth centers, sports clubs, cultural centers, parish organizations, and territorial coordinators. In 1974, she began to work as a secretary at the UNDP. After retiring, as operations manager, she focused on citizen work through non-governmental organizations, such as the Union of Neighborhood Boards of Providencia (2006–2008), Ciudad Viva, the Chilean Association of Patrimonial Zones and Neighborhoods, the Association for a Santiago on a Human Scale and the Network of Citizen Territories.

Primary elections in Providencia were organized by the opposition to Mayor Cristián Labbé, a member of the Independent Democratic Union. There she was the winner with 39.7%, beating Cristóbal Bellolio of Red Liberal and Javier Insulza of the Socialist Party. In the elections of October 28, she was elected mayor of Providencia, defeating Labbé, who had served as mayor of the commune for sixteen years.

She took office on December 6, 2012. She unsuccessfully sought re-election in the 2016 municipal elections, as she was defeated by the Chilean candidate Vamos Evelyn Matthei.

== Controversies ==
In an interview conducted in September 2012, during her campaign for mayor of Providencia, Josefa Errázuriz stated that she was against same-sex marriage, which triggered criticism from LGBT. Subsequently, the then-candidate retracted her statement, specifying that she was in favor of same-sex marriage.

In June 2013, Josefa Errázuriz was involved in a controversy when she began the process of changing the name of Avenida 11 de Septiembre to Avenida Nueva Providencia, its original name. A group of councilors from the Alliance —a center-right coalition— boycotted the session where the eventual name change would be voted on, calling it a "media whim", and alleged a contradiction between the participatory vocation of the mayor and her refusal to submit the decision to a communal plebiscite was achieved quorum to meet and the change was approved after a 4–1 vote in councilors and the support of the mayor.

In July 2013, in the context of the student protests, a group of representatives of the Liceo Carmela Carvajal accused the mayor of "washing her hands" by endorsing the seizures, a situation that occurred after the mayor ignored their call to use the public force and evict the municipal schools and high schools.

In December 2014, an article in the newspaper El Mostrador reported that on June 28, 2013, the mayor used the municipal palace located in Providencia to celebrate her nephew's marriage, which again earned her the target of criticism. The mayor replied that "...any neighbor can occupy the Falabella Palace."

In 2017, the municipality of Providencia filed a complaint against three former employees Eliécer Martínez, Mariano Rosenzvaig, and Jaime Brito Jara, later the complaint was extended to the already former mayor Josefa Errazuriz, for her role as president of the Board of Directors of the Corporation of Social development. This complaint is due to the possible embezzlement of funds in addition to the misuse of school grants. This allegation is based on an external audit by KPMG which found a total shortfall of $6.925 million between state grants and CDS monies, much of it unsupported. The greatest losses were concentrated in the Administration areas, with 2,968 million pesos; Education, with 2,792 million pesos; and Health, with 1,164 million pesos. These crimes were committed in her period between 2014 and 2016. The involvement of Josefa Errázuriz in the complaint is due to two reasons: 1) the alternate secretary of the corporation, Eliécer Martínez, who also happened to be the municipal finance director in her term was selected by the mayor 2) legally the chairman of the board of directors is responsible for overseeing the use of the entity's money, for which complicity or negligence on the part of her administration as chairman of the board is assumed.
