= Terremoto (drink) =

Chilean cocktail

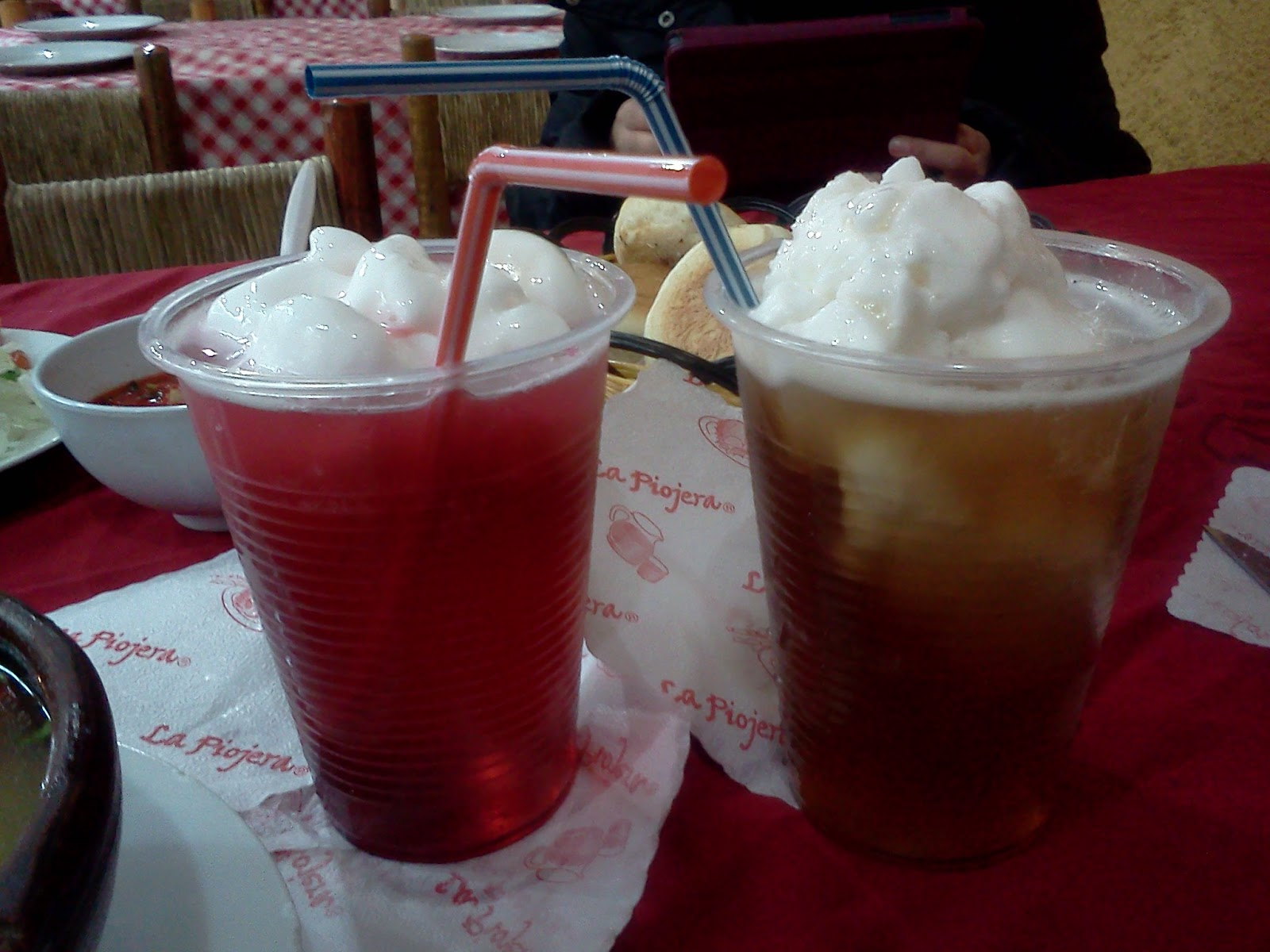
- Two varieties of terremoto as served in La Piojera in Santiago, Chile
- Type: Wine cocktail
- Ingredients: Pipeño wine; pineapple ice cream; grenadine; Sprite or 7up (kids/no alcohol version)

Terremoto is a traditional Chilean cocktail created at the end of the 20th century. It can be seen as a derivative of Ponche a la Romana. Its name literally means earthquake, due to the fact that it was invented after the 1985 earthquake in Chile. Although its origin is not confirmed and many claim its creation, several bars such as La Piojera, Rincón de los canallas, and El Hoyo have contributed to popularizing the drink in Chilean culture.

The drink's main ingredients are white Pipeño wine or non-denominated white wine (generic wine of any strain), pineapple ice cream and grenadine. It is tradition to serve the drink in a 400 ml glass. A half-size Terremoto served directly after the first one is referred to as a Réplica (aftershock). If served in a larger jug, it is popularly known as Cataclismo (cataclysm); while if a single small drink is served, it is referred to as a Temblor (small-scale earthquake). If made with red wine instead of Pipeño, the cocktail is then known as Africano or Terremoto Africano (African earthquake).

== History ==
Wines with a sweet additive go through a long historical tradition, originating in colonial Chile, from which the Asoleados of Cauquenes and the Pajaretes from Huasco and Elqui are still present to this day. Meringue or egg frosting used to be added to sweet wines. The American documentary Travel Talks (1930) shows members of the Chilean upper class consuming wine together with sweet foods, such as champagne containing fresh seasonal fruits. A similar punch containing fruits or pineapple ice cream became popular in the mid-sixties and seventies, particularly in some bars on Paseo Ahumada and Calle Santo Domingo. By the 1970s, the practice of adding pineapple ice cream to carbonated wine became a seasonal custom, specially during end-of-year celebrations. Red wine with condensed milk became popular during the 1980s in some bars outside the historic center of Santiago.

The bar La Piojera in downtown Santiago was, according to its tenant, known for serving this drink since before 1985, In said restaurant, the Replica is also served, as well as the Tsunami, which contains beer, wine, pisco and ice.

The best-known anecdote regarding the origin of the cocktail's name refers to the restaurant El Hoyo, located in the Estación Central. According to its tenant, German reporters had come to cover the 1985 earthquake in Chile, as they quickly drank the cocktail and one of them, feeling dizzy when standing up, exclaimed: "Now this one really is an earthquake!".
