= Virginia Errázuriz =

Chilean artist (b. 1941)

Maria Virginia Errázuriz Guilisasti, also known as Virginia Errázuriz, (born 1941 in Santiago, Chile) is a Chilean painter, professor, printmaker and draftsperson.

== Biography ==
Errázuriz studied at University of Chile (1961–1965) and University of York (1979). By 1964 Errázuriz began to get involved in art. She discovered new materials. By the end of the 1960s she began to work professionally and to have exhibitions. Her exhibitions were organized by her husband Francisco Brugnoli (born 1935). He took her experimental works to the Museo de Arte Latinoamericano. In the late 1960s Errázuriz began to educate students at universities across Santiago. Her art was exhibited in Chile and across the world, including Barcelona, Buenos Aires and Venezuela. In 1979 she finished her studies at the University of York in Toronto, Canada. Her work is described as an economy of means, meaning she selects materials to emphasize the objects frailty. Through her work, we can see clearly an antiestablishment side that responds to the social and political issues endured by her country of Chile, during the years of 1970-1980. Her unique approach to art looked to make the viewer perplexed, as her work demonstrated puzzling objects and installations.

== Selected works ==
Errázuriz creates her artwork using materials that are either unwanted or found, which typically relate to the economy. Her collection was put away and unclassified for a long period. When her collection was eventually put out it gained recognition. Her artwork can be viewed in the Chilean National Collections, which is located in the Museo de Arte Contemporaneo and Museo de la Solidaridad Salvador Allende in Santiago.

Her art is meant to represent social and political issues in Chile. She creates puzzles that the audience must piece together via "knick-knacks, postcards, and other mundane objects, to which the spectator must ascribe meaning and use as a basis for interpretation."

=== I'll Be Right Back, 1965 ===
This piece was inspired by multiple found items near her, to help describe the daily life of an individual.

=== Tapestry (The Debutant), 1966 ===
This piece is an installation exhibited in the Space to Dream.

=== Diary of a Day, 1979 ===
This self-portrait was created using known objects that she used daily to create her art. She used a small spiral notebook to represent her diary that contains drawings and objects that help demonstrates her daily life.
