= O'Higgins Park =

Public park in Santiago, Chile

- Parque O'Higgins
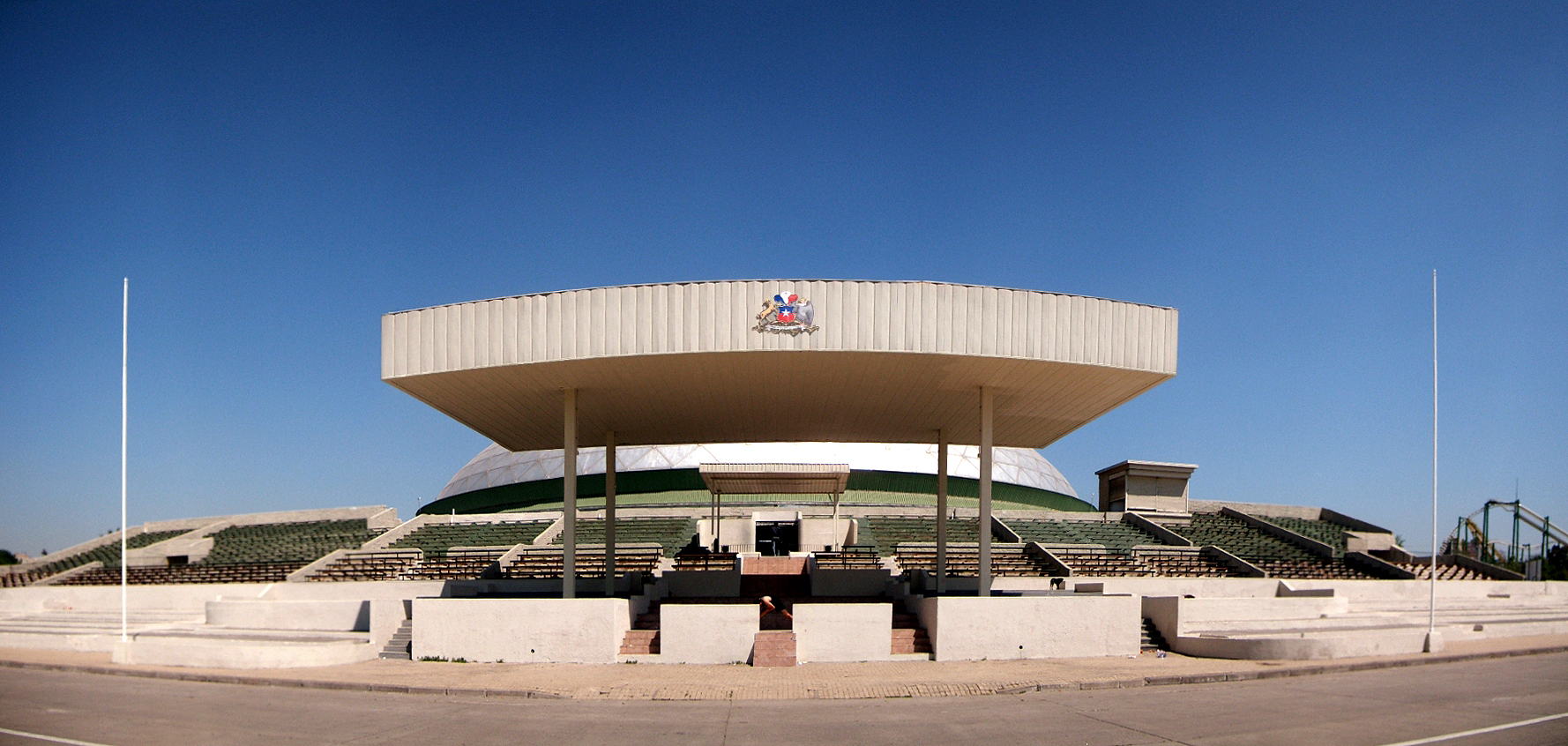
- Interactive map of O'Higgins Park
- Type: Urban Park
- Location: Santiago, Chile
- Coordinates: 33°27′59″S 70°39′40″W
- Area: 75 hectares (190 acres)
- Created: 1873
- Operator: Municipality of Santiago
- Status: Open

O'Higgins Park (Spanish: Parque O'Higgins, previously known as Parque Cousiño), covering approximately 75 hectares (190 acres), is Santiago, Chile's second largest public park after Metropolitan Park. It is situated in the center of the capital city, within the Santiago Commune.

Named after Bernardo O'Higgins, one of Chile's founding fathers, the park is a popular destination for families on weekends and holidays, particularly during the national holiday on September 18, when traditional gathering places for dancing, eating, and drinking, called fondas and ramadas, are open to the public for a few days.

From 2011 and 2019, O'Higgins Park served as the location of the annual Lollapalooza Chile music festival.

== History ==
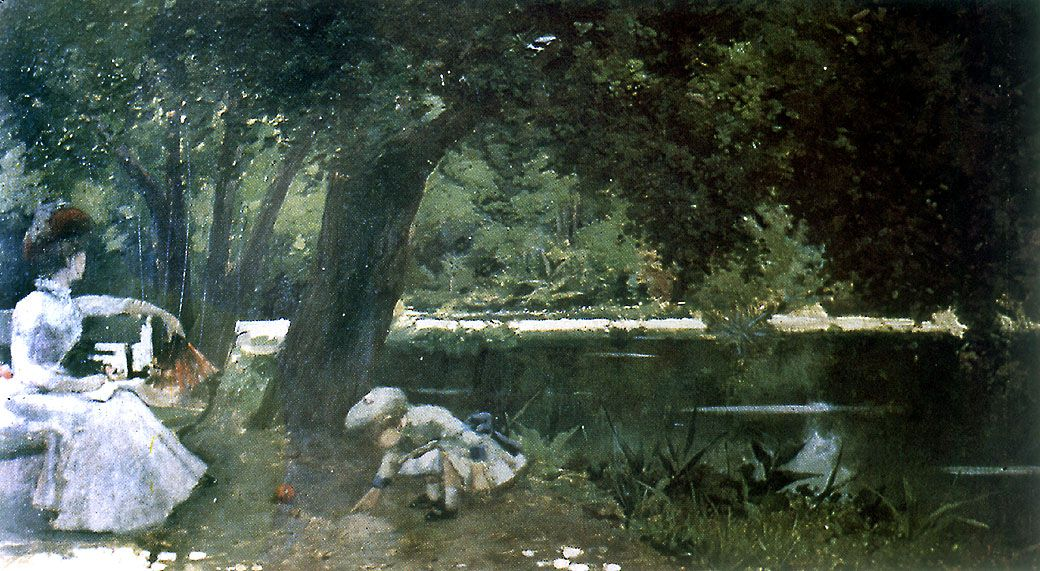
Old pond in O'Higgins Park; nineteenth century oil painting by Alberto Orrego Luco

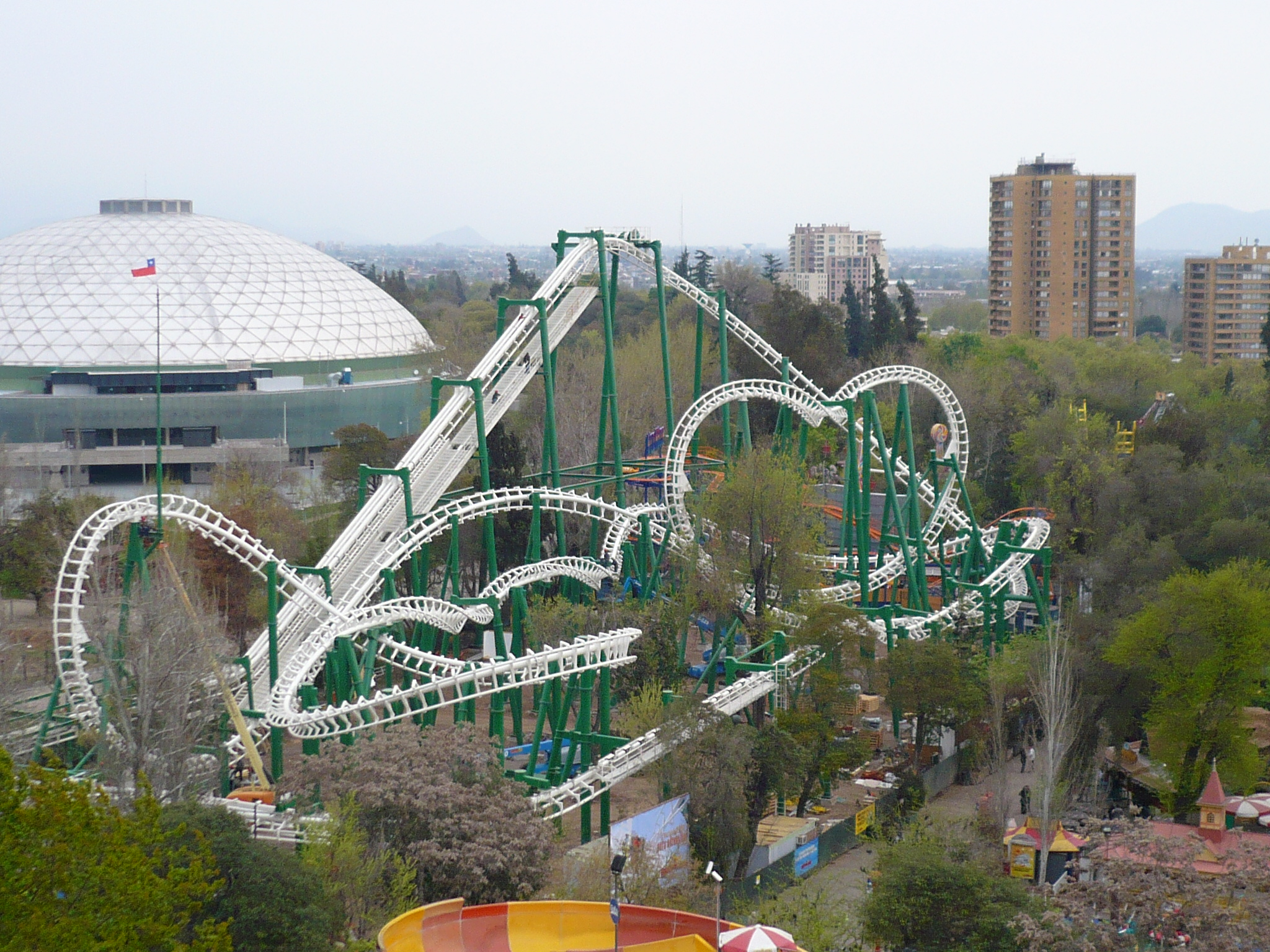
Amusement park Fantasilandia, located in one of the corners of O'Higgins Park

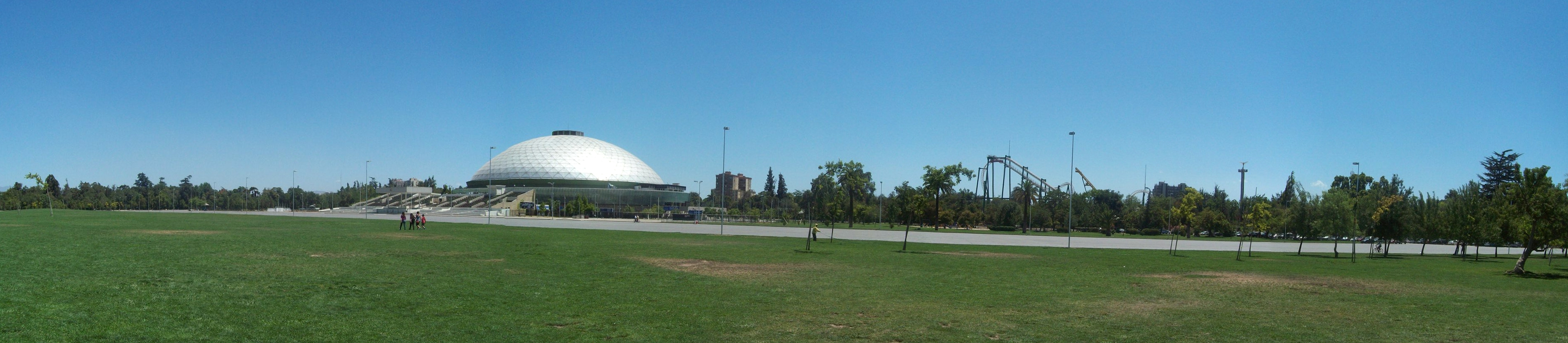
O'Higgins Park esplanade

The present-day O'Higgins Park is the result of gradual evolution over its history. The site, originally called Pampilla or El Llano, was a flat open space between the modern-day Santa Rosa and San Ignacio streets, where people gathered to celebrate Fiestas Patrias, Chile's national day.

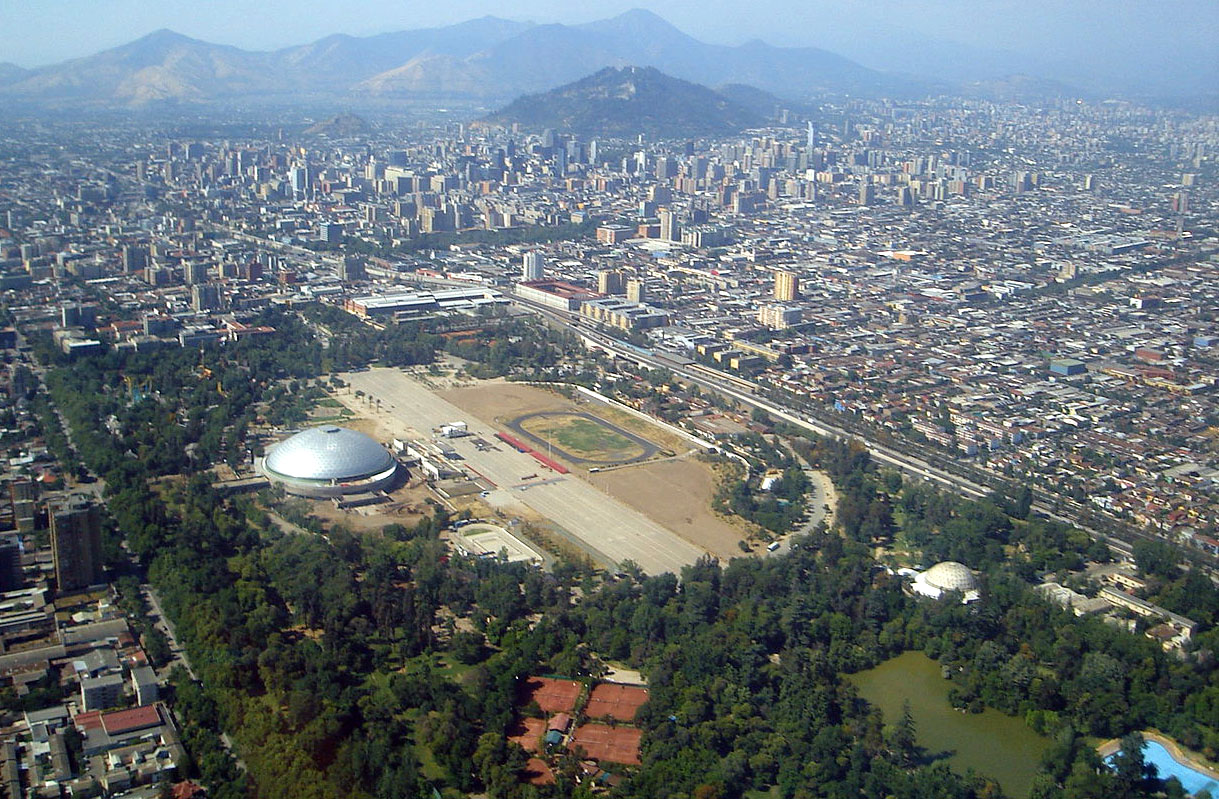
Aerial view of O'Higgins Park, looking northeast (c. 2004)

The government bought the land in 1845 and used the southern portion for state buildings, including a jail. In 1870, it gave the northern portion of the terrain to Chilean politician, entrepreneur and philanthropist Luis Cousiño. Inspired by the parks he saw in Europe, he decided to create one in his own city and contracted French landscaper Guillermo Renner to shape it into parkland. The park was inaugurated by his widow Isidora Goyenechea in 1873 and was named Parque Cousiño in his honor.

=== Movistar Arena ===
In 1956, work began on an indoor stadium inside O'Higgins Park which would eventually become the largest covered arena in Chile. Construction started but then stalled, leaving only the bare structure of the stadium complete until 1999, when the roof was finally completed. After further delays, the stadium at last opened to the public in 2006 as the Arena Santiago. In 2008, Telefonica's cellphone division Movistar bought the naming rights and the stadium became the Movistar Arena.

=== Religious events ===
On 19 December 1926, the Church in Chile used Cousiño Park for a ceremony to crown an image of Our Lady of Mount Carmel, Chile's patron saint, led by Benedetto Aloisi Masella, the papal nuncio to the country. The painting used in the ceremony is preserved in Santiago Metropolitan Cathedral and is carried through the streets of Santiago on the last Sunday of September each year.

In 1987, Pope John Paul II visited Chile and led a beatification ceremony in O'Higgins Park for Saint Teresa of Los Andes. The ceremony had to be suspended when violence broke out between the Carabineros de Chile (Chilean police force and gendarmerie) and crowds protesting Augusto Pinochet's military dictatorship. The situation calmed and the pope, believed to be a supporter of Chile's return to democracy, concluded his address with the words "love is stronger".

=== Davis Cup controversy ===
In 2000, the Arena Santiago in O'Higgins Park played host to a tie tennis match between Chile and Argentina as part of the Davis Cup. During the second singles match between Nicolás Massú and Mariano Zabaleta, the crowd reacted violently, throwing objects on the court and forcing Argentina to withdraw.

=== Lollapalooza Chile ===
In November 2010, musician and Lollapalooza founder Perry Farrell announced that the first overseas version of the rock festival would take place in O'Higgins Park, Santiago. The inaugural Lollapalooza Chile took place on 2–3 April 2011 and drew a crowd of about 100,000, with venues including the park's Movistar Arena, La Elipse, and La Cupula Theater. Lollapalooza Chile has returned annually since then, most recently on 13–15 March 2026.

== Infrastructure ==
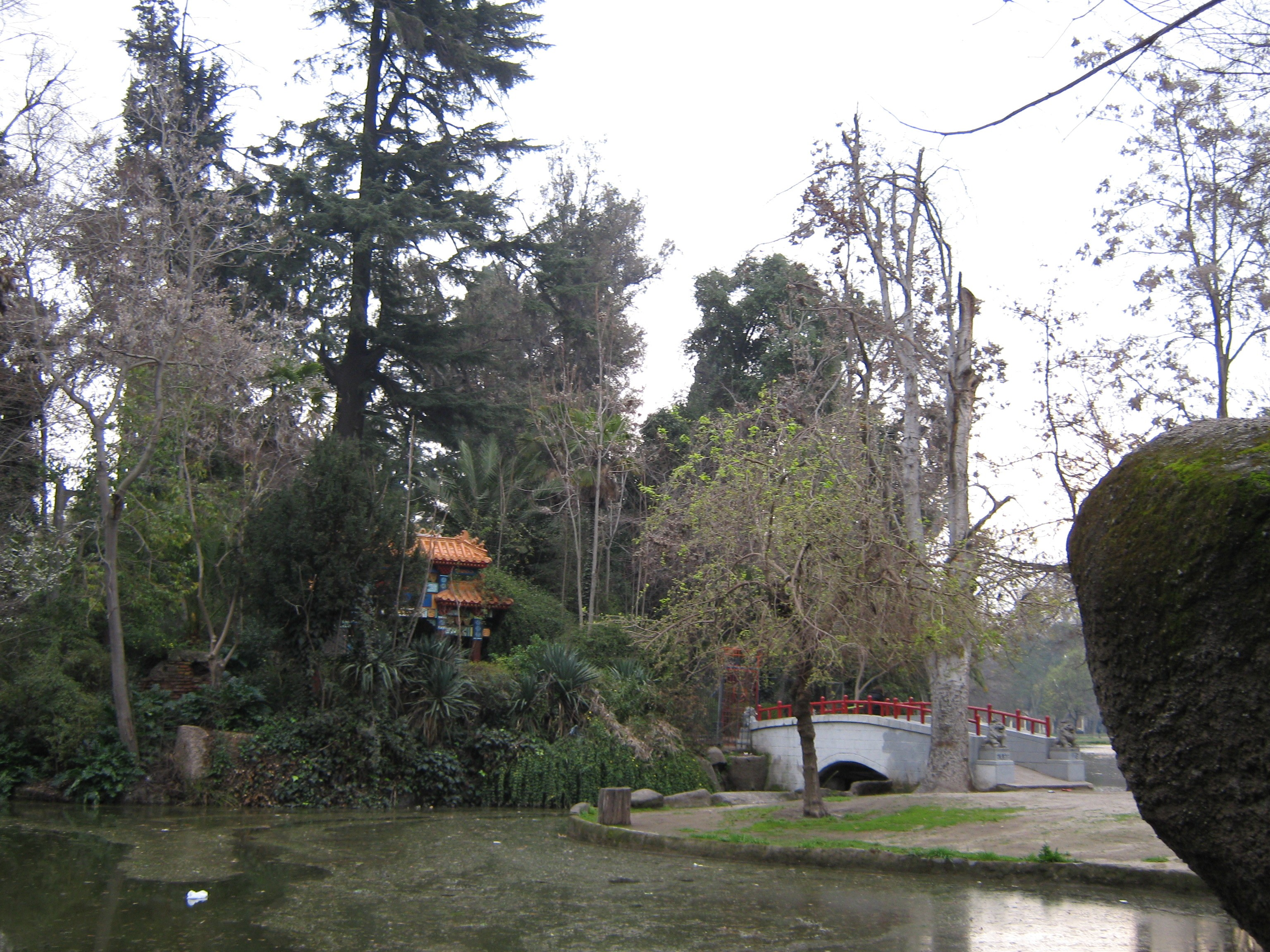
Chinese park

The park is located next to Parque O'Higgins metro station and near Santiago's Autopista Central highway.

Key structures and facilities include:

The Movistar Arena, one of the largest multi-use stadia in South America. Campo de Marte, also known as La Elipse (Spanish: the ellipse), where a military parade takes place every September 19 for the Day of the Glories of the Army. El Pueblito (Spanish: little village), where visitors can find shops, craft stalls and museums, including the Museum of the Huaso and the Insect and Snail Museum. Fantasilandia, the biggest amusement park in Chile, located in the Olympic pool park's northwestern corner.

There is also a public pool, a roller-skating field, a skate park, tennis courts, a soccer field, a theater and an artificial lake, with walking trails crossing the length of the park.
