= Vino pipeño =

Wine from Chile

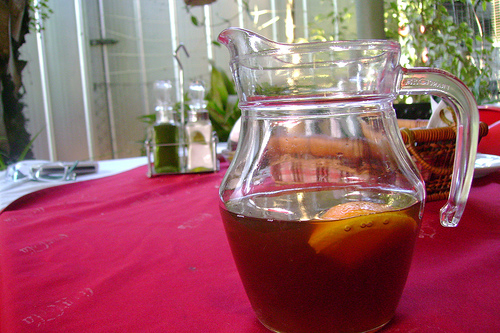
Vino pipeño

Vino Pipeño is a wine from Chile that is made from ordinary grape stock, different from other wines known by their distinctive names.

Vino Pipeño is similar in flavor and sweetness to grapes from parish wines, as both come from young grapes. The drink is usually served with meats and typical dishes of the traditional Chilean home.

Its short fermentation and aging processes give Vino Pipeño an opaque and very intense brown hue.
