= List of national drinks =

Distinct beverages associated with a particular country

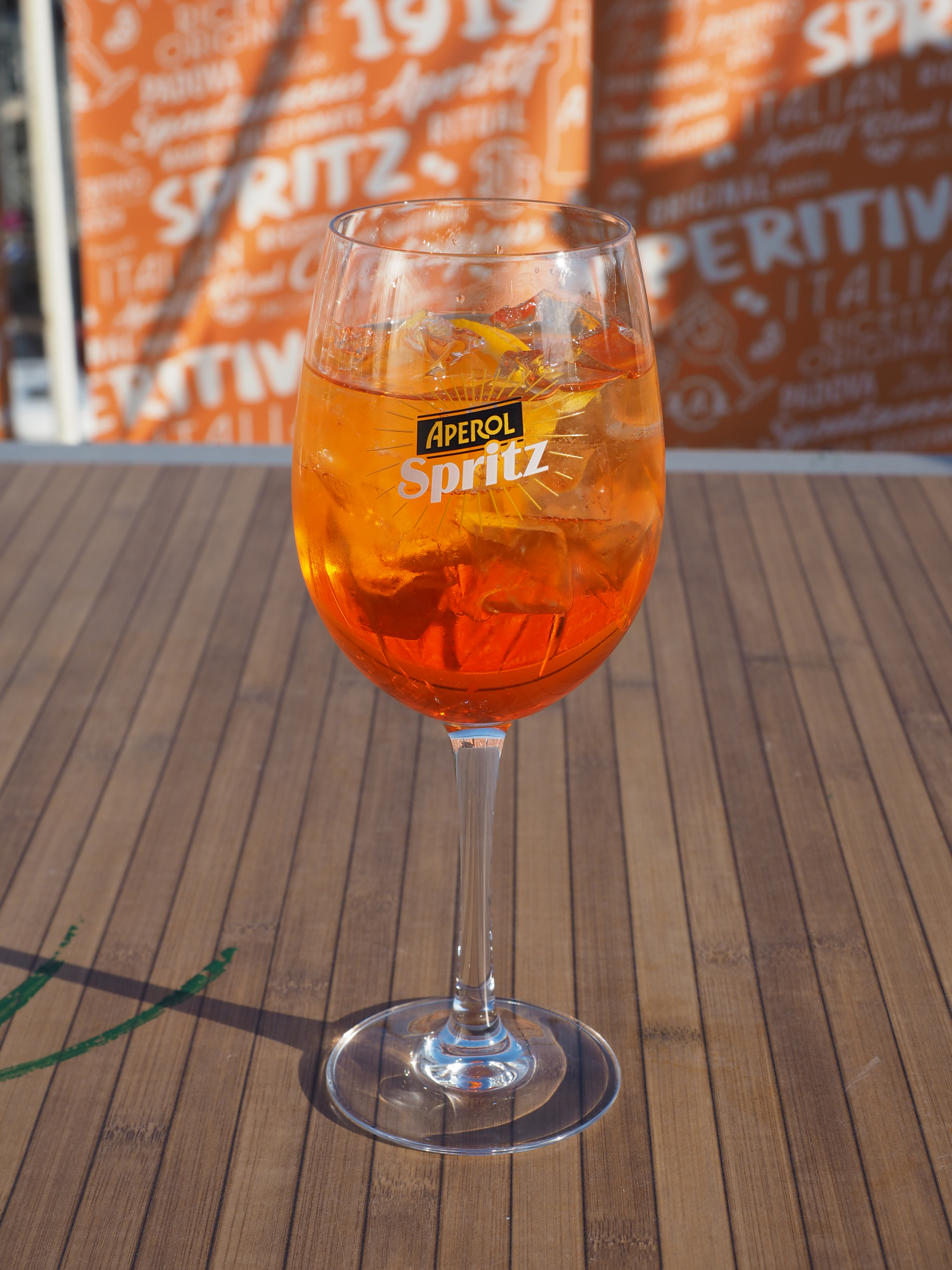
The spritz is an Italian wine-based cocktail, commonly served as an apéritif across Italy. It consists of Prosecco, digestive bitters, and soda water. The original spritz veneziano uses Select as bitters and was created in Venice in 1920.

A national drink is a distinct beverage that is strongly associated with a particular country, and can be part of their national identity and self-image. These drinks can be either alcoholic or non-alcoholic. Alcoholic national drinks might be spirits consumed straight (like vodka in Russia), but more often, they are mixed drinks (such as caipirinhas in Brazil and Singapore Slings in Singapore), beer, or wine. Non-alcoholic national drinks include Coca-Cola in the United States, boba tea in Taiwan, and Thai iced tea in Thailand.

Several factors can qualify a beverage as a national drink:

- Regional Ingredients and Popularity: The drink is made from locally sourced ingredients and is commonly consumed, such as mango lassi in India, which uses dahi, a traditional yogurt.
- Unique Local Ingredients: The beverage contains an exotic ingredient that is unique to the region.
- Cultural Tradition: The drink plays a significant role in festive traditions and cultural heritage.
- Official Promotion: The country actively promotes the drink as a national symbol.

Choosing a single national drink can be challenging for some countries due to their diverse cultures and populations, such as Mexico or India. Conversely, some beverages, like pisco sour, are claimed by more than one country—both Peru and Chile, in this case.

Below is a list of national drinks categorized within geo-political regions modified from the United Nations' five "regional groups". This list generally excludes moonshines or illicitly produced alcoholic beverages.

== America ==
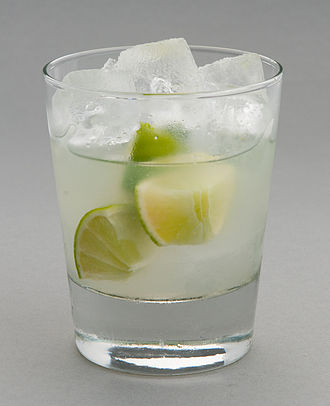
Caipirinha is the national drink of Brazil and is made from cachaça, lime, and sugar.

=== North ===
- Canada: A Caesar is a cocktail that originated in Calgary, and is widely drunk in all parts of Canada. Similar to a Bloody Mary, it contains vodka, a blend of Clamato juice (a type of garden cocktail and clam broth), hot sauce, and Worcestershire sauce, and is served with ice in a celery salt-rimmed glass, typically garnished with a stalk of celery or pickle and wedge of lime. Calgary officially celebrated an anniversary of its creation and launched a national petition for it to be recognized as the official cocktail of Canada.
- United States: Coffee was defiantly adopted as an alternative to British tea in the period leading up to the American Revolution. Coca-Cola is America's iconic soft drink, with the name of the drink referring to two of its original ingredients: coca leaves and kola nuts (a source of caffeine). Bourbon (whiskey), named for Bourbon County, Kentucky, is a corn whiskey aged in charred oak barrels - and was proclaimed the U.S. National Spirit by an act of Congress in 1964.
- Mexico: Tequila is a liquor distilled from the blue agave plant, primarily in the area surrounding the city of Tequila, of the central western Mexican state of Jalisco. In 2018, the Mexican government approved a proposal to celebrate every third Saturday of March as National Tequila Day. A Margarita is a famous cocktail that is made from tequila, as well as triple sec and lime juice. In Mexico, Aguas Frescas are also quite popular, two notable ones being Jamaica and Horchata. Hot chocolate is also a very popular drink , having been consumed by Mayans since around 3,000 years ago.

=== Central and South ===
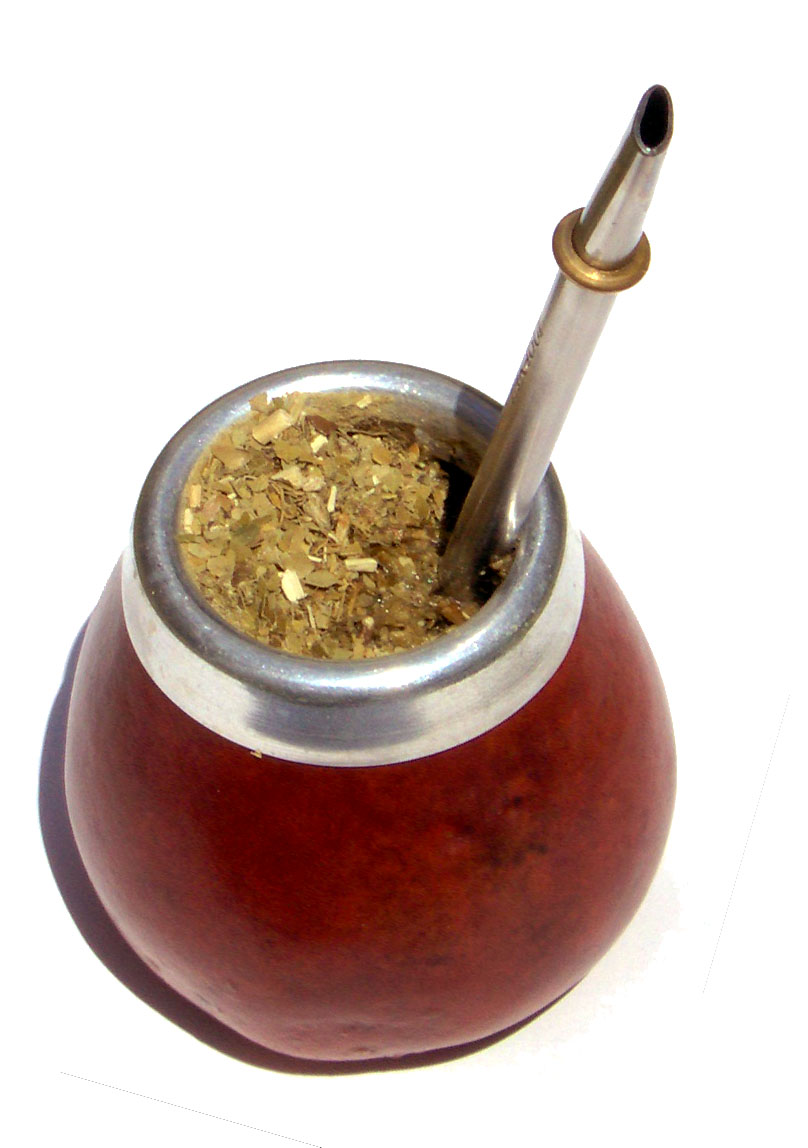
Mate, a traditional beverage in southern South America, especially in Argentina, Paraguay, Uruguay, and the south of Brazil.

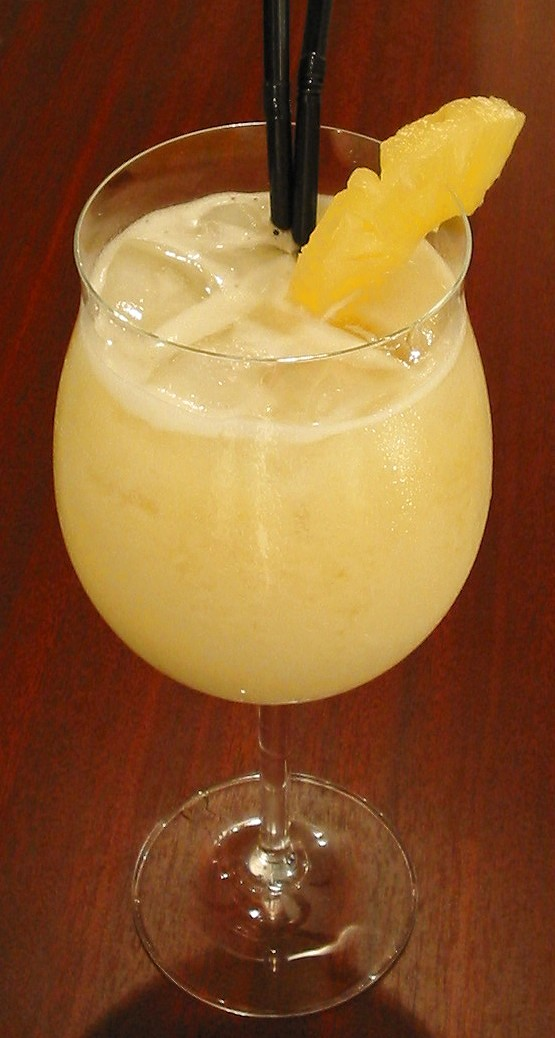
Piña colada, a cocktail made with rum, cream of coconut, and pineapple juice, usually served either blended or shaken with ice. It may be garnished with either a pineapple wedge, maraschino cherry, or both. The drink originated in Puerto Rico.

- Antigua and Barbuda: Rum
- Argentina: Mate, Wine, Fernet con coca, Hesperidina.
- Bahamas: Switcha
- Barbados: Mauby
- Belize: Rum Punch
- Bermuda: Rum swizzle, Dark N' Stormy (Only classified as such if made with Gosling's Dark Rum only made in Bermuda)
- Bolivia (Plurinational State of): Chuflay, Singani
- Brazil: Caipirinha is a well-known cocktail made of cachaça, lime, and sugar, while guaraná is a fruit native to Brazil, common in several drinks, specially soft drinks.
- Curaçao: Curaçao liqueur is traditionally made with the dried peels of the laraha, a bitter orange native to Curaçao. The liqueur is distilled along with sweet fragrant oils, derived from the dried laraha peels. Following distillation blue or orange colors are added for an exotic appearance.
- Chile: Pisco sour, Piscola
- Colombia: Aguardiente, coffee
- Costa Rica: Imperial, Cacique Guaro
- Cuba: Cuba Libre, Mojito, Daiquiri
- Dominica: Kubuli, Coconut rum punch
- Dominican Republic: Mama Juana, Presidente (beer), coffee, rum, Brugal, Barceló (rum), Morir soñando
- Ecuador: Chicha
- El Salvador: Pilsener, Champagne cola
- Grenada: Rum Punch
- Guatemala: Gallo
- Guyana: Mauby
- Haiti: Barbancourt is a rum produced and bottled in Haiti by Société du Rhum Barbancourt, one Haiti's oldest companies. It is made by distillation of sugar cane juice rather than the sugar cane by-product molasses. Fermentation of fresh sugar cane juice is considered to provide a more flavorful product.
- Honduras: Pinol
- Jamaica: Rum Punch
- Nicaragua: Macuá
- Panama: Seco Herrerano
- Paraguay: Mate is an infusion that is prepared by soaking dried yerba mate leaves in hot water and served with a metal straw and a hollow calabash. This is served and shared in the round, making it an integral part of society. Its origin is shared with Argentina and Uruguay. Carrulim is an alcoholic beverage made from caña blanca paraguaya, rue, sugar and lemon juice.
- Peru: Pisco sour's name comes from pisco, which is its base liquor, and the cocktail term sour, in reference to sour citrus juice and sweetener components. The drink originated in the city of Pisco. Inca Kola, a lemon verbena based soda, is also popular.
- Puerto Rico (US): Piña colada
- Saint Kitts and Nevis: Rum
- Saint Lucia: Bounty brand Rum
- Saint Vincent and the Grenadines: Golden Apple Juice
- Suriname: Kasiri
- Trinidad and Tobago: Queen's Park Swizzle
- Uruguay: Mate, medio y medio, uvita (a type of fortified wine), grappamiel, amarga (a kind of bitter or amaro made of local herbs), schnaps made from local caña or grappa.
- Venezuela (Bolivarian Republic of): Rum, tizana

== Europe ==
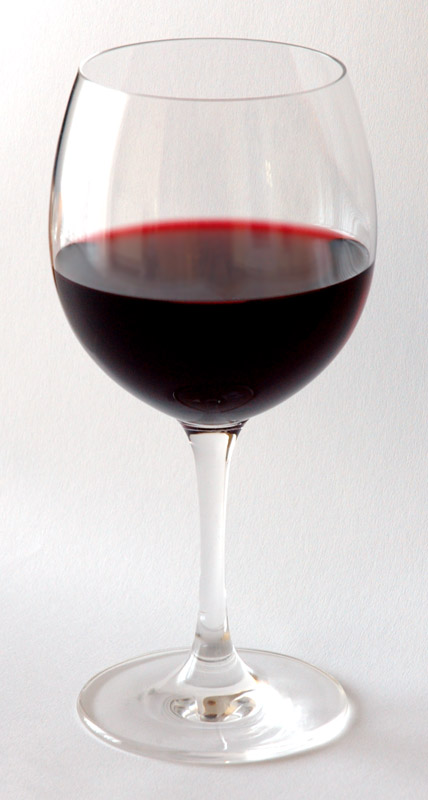
Red wine is popular in many European countries, notably France and Italy.

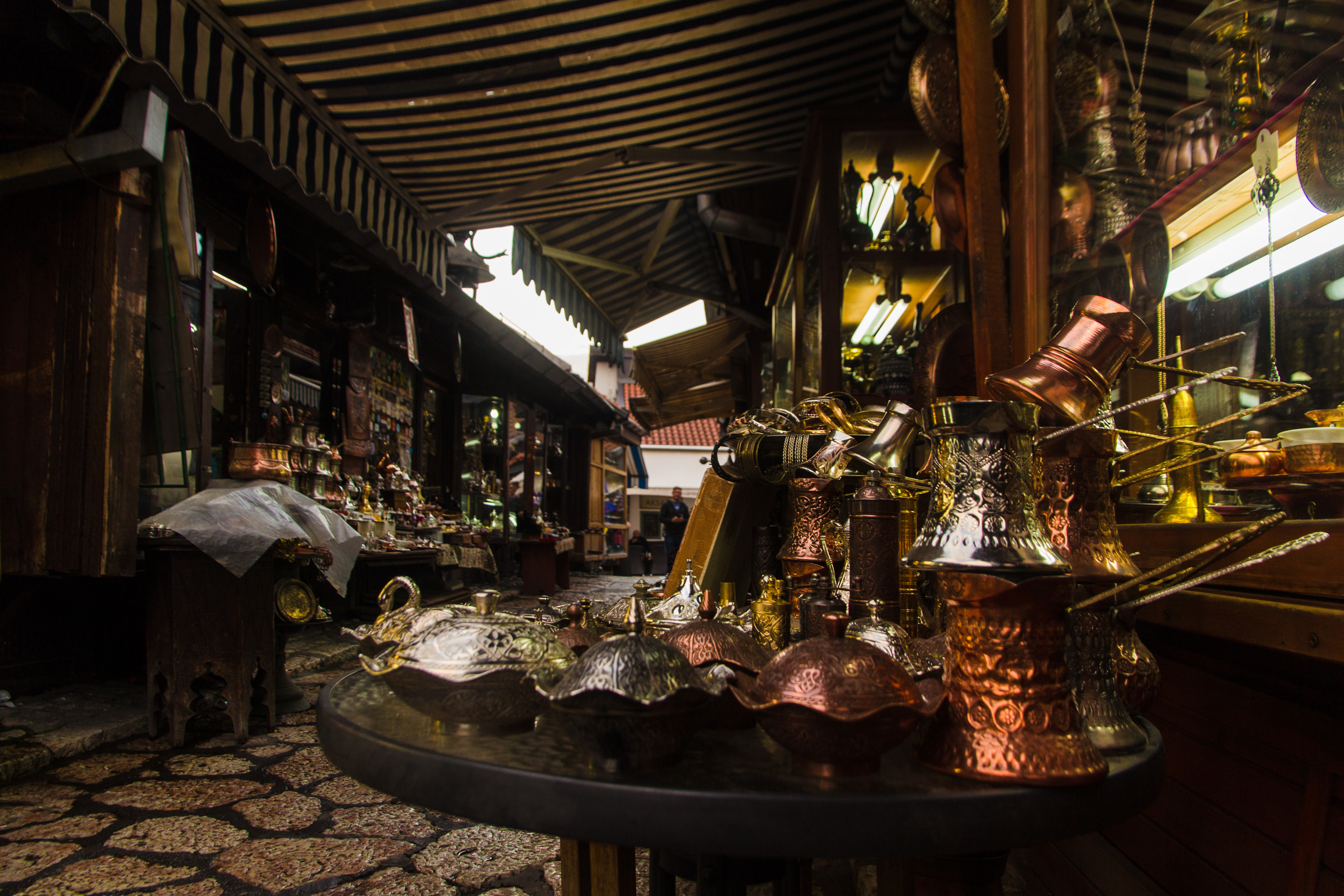
Coffee accessories in small shops in Baščaršija, Bosnia and Herzegovina.

The "beer belt" in Europe includes Belgium, Germany, the UK, and Ireland, whereas the "wine belt" includes France and the Mediterranean countries like Spain, Italy, and Greece. Several drinks are common and particular to Slavic countries. Vodka is a clear alcoholic beverage made most often by distilling the liquid from fermented cereal grains and potatoes. Countries where vodka is identified as a national beverage have been referred to as the "vodka belt". Kvass is a traditional fermented non-alcoholic beverage commonly made from rye bread and is drunk in many Slavic countries, as well as Latvia and Lithuania. Kompot is another drink that is traditionally popular throughout this region and made by boiling together different fruit including strawberries, apricots, peaches, apples, and raisins in large volume of water and served hot or cold, depending on tradition and season. Fruit brandies are popular in the Balkans, while Brännvin and Akvavit are popular in Scandinavia.

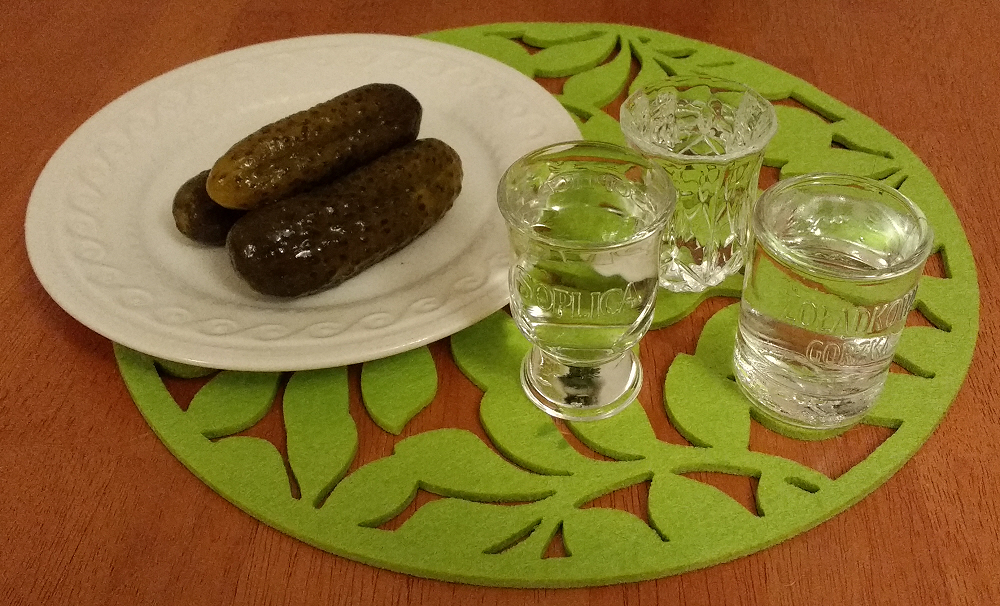
Clear vodka served with pickled cucumber – the usual way of consuming vodka in Slavic countries of the so-called "vodka belt".

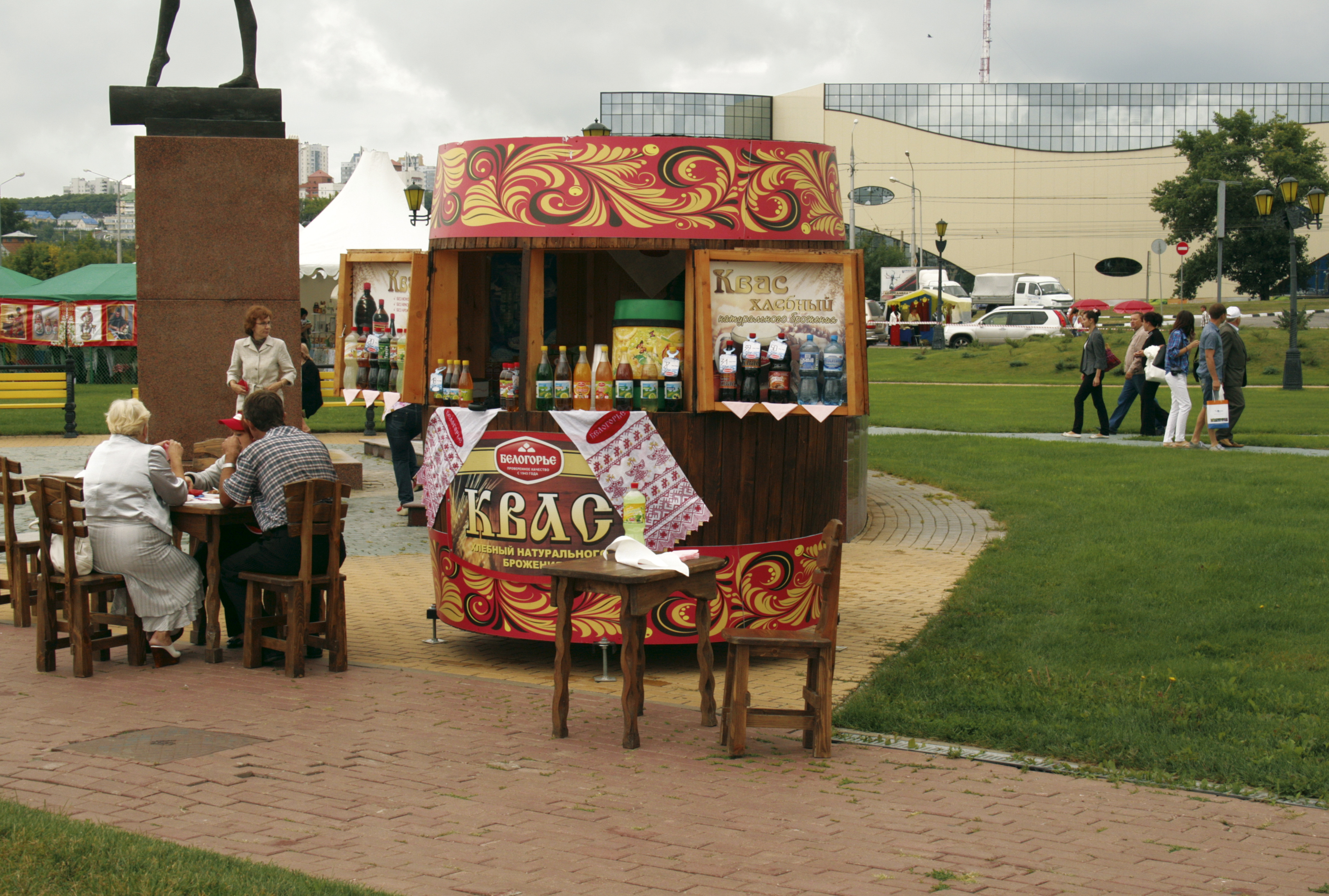
A kvass street vendor in Belgorod, Russia, 2013.

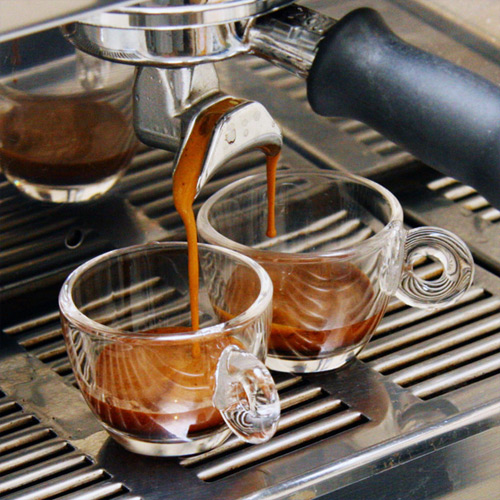
The espresso comes from the Italian esprimere, which means "to express," and refers to the process by which hot water is forced under pressure through ground coffee.

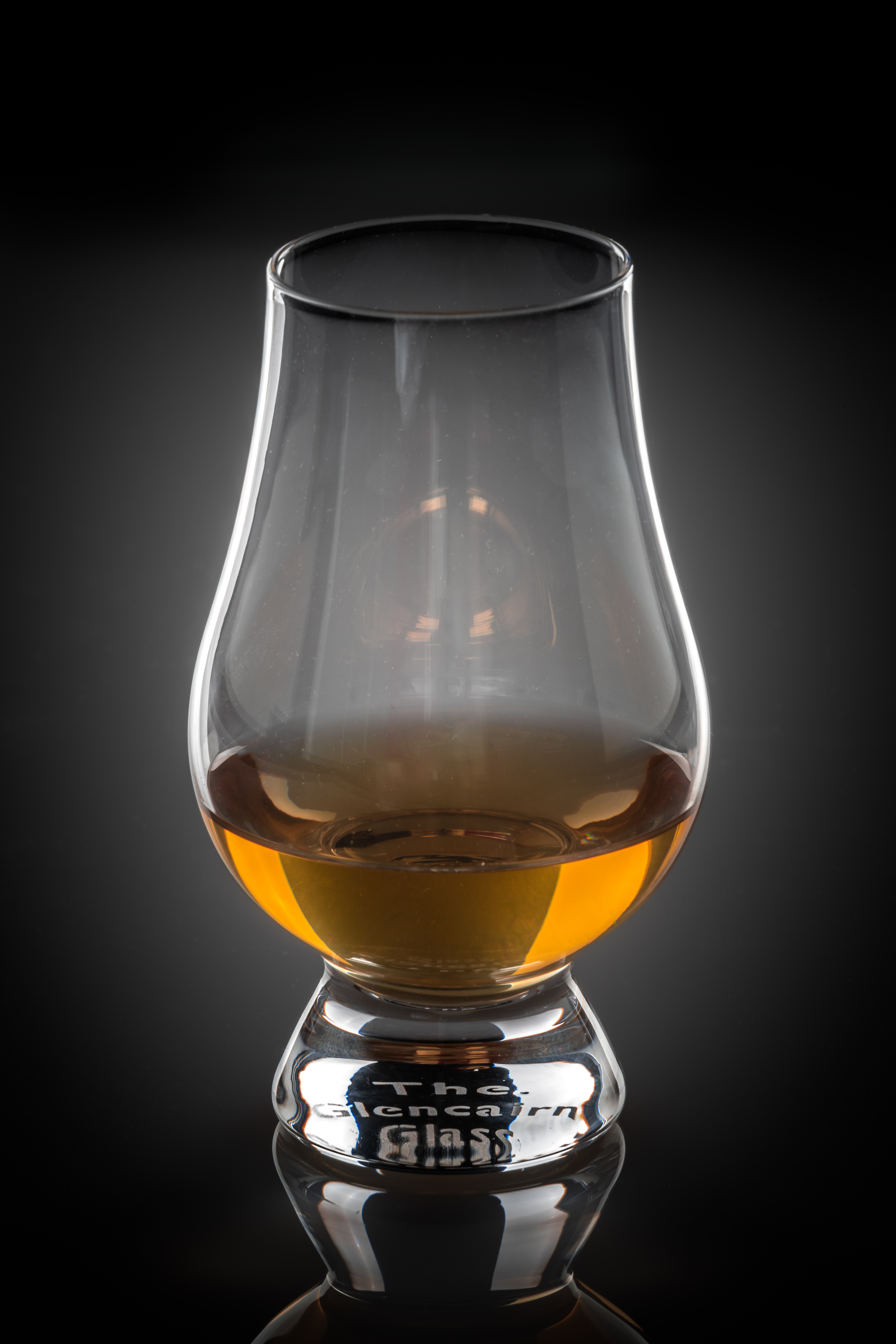
A Glencairn whisky glass.

- Albania: Raki
- Andorra: Brandy, Wine
- Austria: Almdudler
- Belarus: Byarozavik is a traditional Belarusian drink made from birch sap, achieving widespread popularity in the Soviet Union before undergoing a modern resurgence.
- Belgium: Belgium is situated in the "Beer belt" and is known for its beers and breweries. There are over 1,400 kinds of beer and this alcoholic drink is important in Belgian social life. See Belgian beer culture and Beer in Belgium.
- Bosnia and Herzegovina: Rakija, coffee
- Bulgaria: Bulgaria considers Rakia to be its national beverage, as well as the place of origin of this distilled beverage that can be made from fruits like plums and apricots.
- Croatia: Rakija, Pelinkovac, Cedevita
- Cyprus: Zivania, Brandy sour (unofficial)
- Czech Republic: Kofola, Pilsner is a pale lager originating in Plzeň. Becherovka is a traditional Czech bitter.
- Denmark: Akvavit, Brännvin, Snaps, Gammel Dansk
- Estonia: Vana Tallinn, Viru Valge, koduõlu (homebrew beer), kama
- Finland: Coffee, Finlandia (vodka), Koskenkorva, Lonkero, Sahti
- France: Red wine is a type of wine made from dark-colored (black) grape varieties. Champagne is a well known white wine from France. Cognac is a popular brandy from southwest France. Orangina is a popular soft drink in France.
- Germany: Lager, Fanta, Spezi
- Georgia: Chacha and Red wine
- Greece: Ouzo is a dry anise-flavoured aperitif that is widely consumed in Greece and Cyprus.
- Hungary: Pálinka
- Iceland: Brennivín, Appelsín
- Ireland: Irish whiskey is national alcohol. Guinness is the most popular Irish Stout. Club is a popular soft drink.
- Italy: Chinotto is a type of carbonated soft drink produced from the juice of the fruit of the myrtle-leaved orange tree (Citrus myrtifolia); Wine; Spritz; Grappa; Espresso; Cappuccino
- Kosovo: Rakia and Semoj, fermented cabbage juice
- Latvia: Riga Black Balsam
- Liechtenstein: Blauburgunder
- Lithuania: Midus, Gira
- Luxembourg: Crémant de Luxembourg
- Malta: Kinnie, Bajtra liqueur (unofficial), cactus pear liquor, Maltese falcon
- Moldova: Divin (Distilled Wine, portmanteau of Distilat de Vin)
- Monaco: Champagne
- Montenegro: Rakija
- Netherlands: Jenever, Heineken
- North Macedonia: Rakija, Boza
- Norway: Akvavit, Solo
- Poland: Vodka is regarded a national beverage as some sources consider it to have originated in Poland, dating back to 15th century. Other distinctive alcoholic drinks feature bison grass vodka, krupnik, variety of traditional tinctures (nalewka) like piołunówka, along with traditional Polish meads.
- Portugal: Port wine is a sweet Portuguese fortified wine produced with distilled grape spirits in the Douro Valley in the northern provinces of Portugal and is commonly served as a dessert wine. There are also distinct sorts of non port portuguese wines produced in particular regions.
- Romania: Țuică, sometimes referred to as "white lightning" due to its clarity and potency, is a plum fruit brandy, that is distilled in a brass still, using traditional fire sources such as wood and charcoal. Țuică is traditionally drunk prior to meals and at celebrations.
- Russia: Kvass is a traditional fermented non-alcoholic beverage commonly made from rye bread, and while kvass is seen as the national non-alcoholic drink, it is vodka that most Russians identify as their national alcoholic beverage. Other national beverages include tea and kompot.
- San Marino: Biancale
- Serbia: Rakija, Šljivovica in particular.
- Slovakia: Borovička is a juniper alcoholic spirit. Kofola is a traditional soft drink.
- Slovenia: Schnapps, Cockta
- Spain: Sangria, a punch traditionally consists of red wine and chopped fruit, often with other ingredients such as orange juice or brandy, Mirinda
  - Andalusia: Rebujito, Gazpacho
  - Catalonia: Cava, Wine, Ratafia, Cremat
  - Galicia: Queimada
  - Valencia: Horchata tiger nut variety, orxata de xufa.
- Sweden: Brännvin, Punsch, Akvavit, Julmust, Pommac, Champis, Vodka
- Switzerland: Rivella, Schweppes
- Ukraine: Horilka, Kvass, kompot
- United Kingdom: Tea
  - England: Gin, bitter, Pimms, Stout, Cider, blackcurrant cordial, Buck Fizz, Shandy, Dandelion and burdock
  - Scotland Scotch is a whisky that is by law required to be both produced in Scotland and aged people in oak barrels for at least three years. Irn-Bru (pronounced "Iron Brew") is a sweet, fruity flavoured, soda with a rusty orange color that has been referred to as the country's "other national drink."
  - Wales: Perry Welsh Whisky
- Vatican City: Wine

== Africa ==
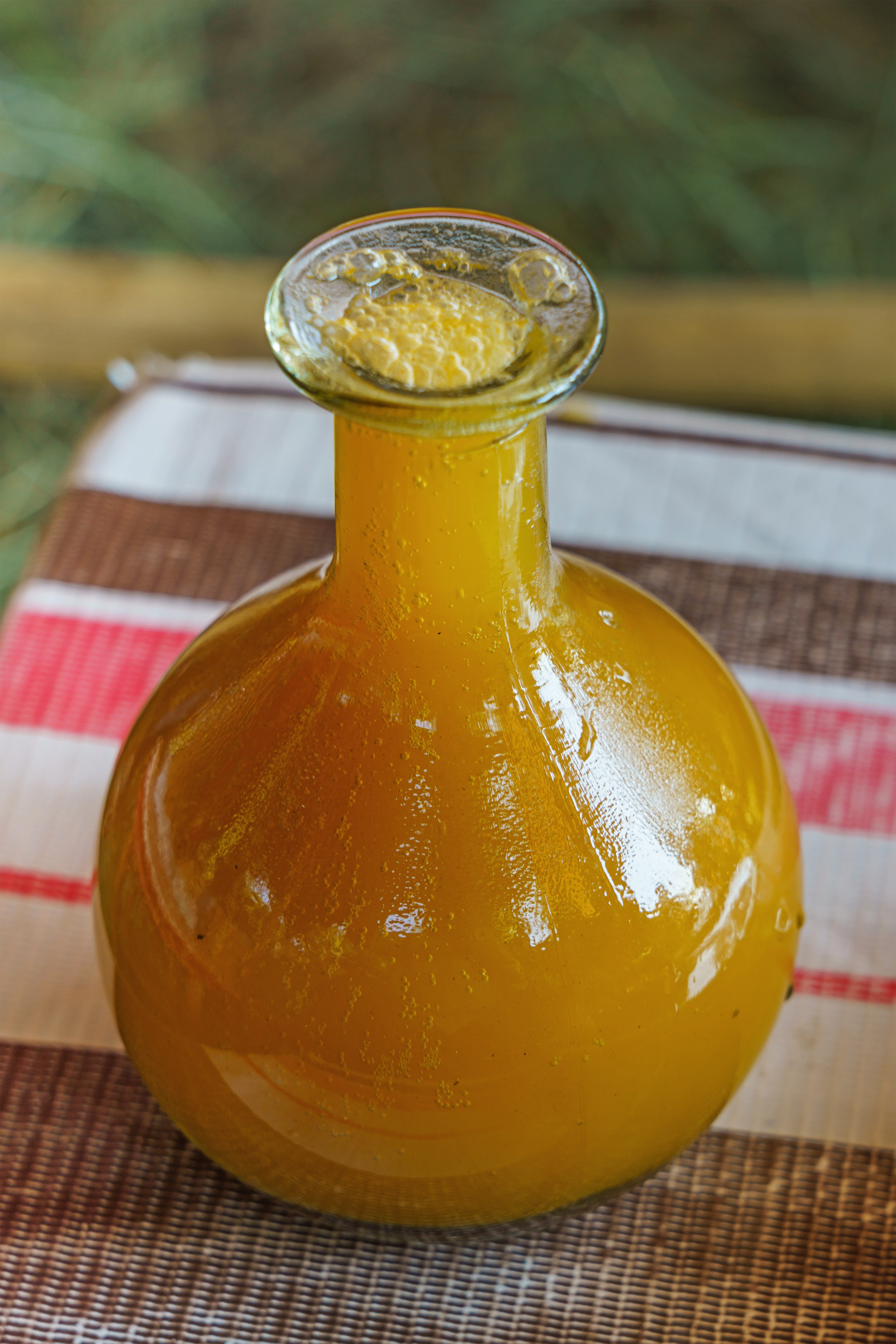
A berele glass containing tej, a honey wine brewed and consumed in Ethiopia.

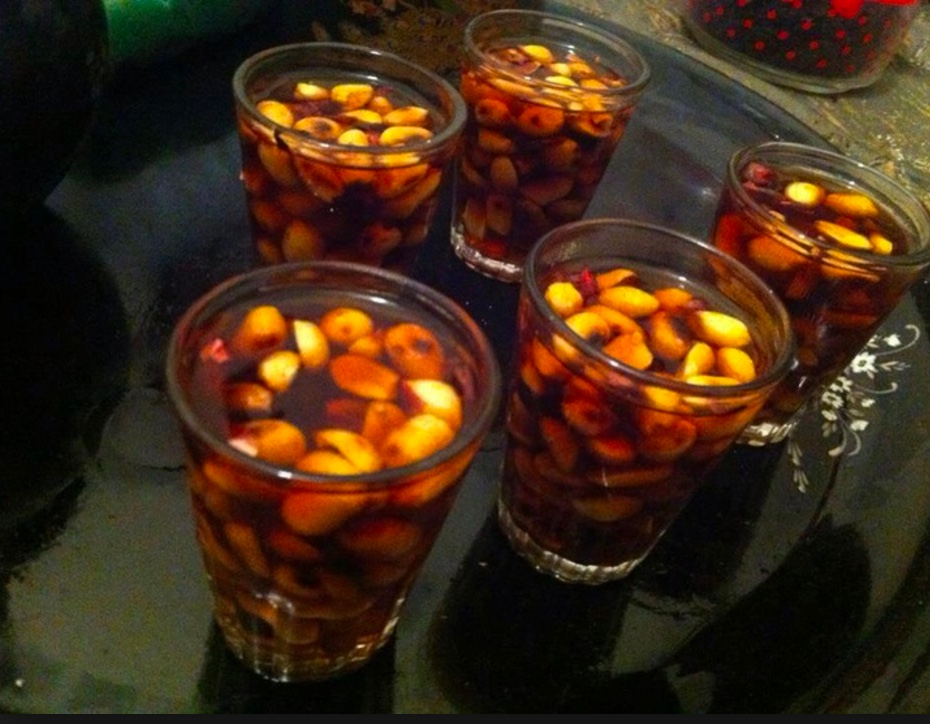
Libyan tea with peanuts

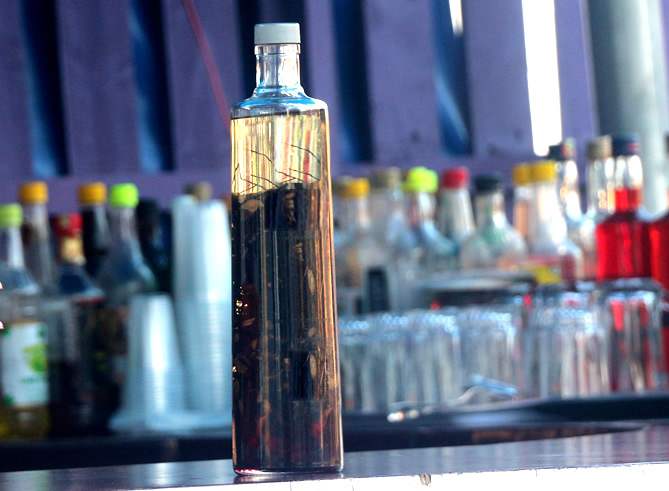
Akpeteshie is a liquor produced by distilling palm wine or sugar cane, primarily in the region of Western Africa.

- Algeria: Coffee, Tea
- Angola: Cuca Beer
- Benin: Sodabi
- Botswana: Chibuku Shake Shake is a traditional beer that originated in Botswana, and now other African countries manufacture it. Keone Mooka Mageu is a traditional fermented porridge, but it is drunk. Ginger beer is a favorite non-alcoholic homemade drink which is served at special occasions, like weddings and parties.
- Burkina Faso: Zoomkoom
- Burundi: Sorghum beer
- Cabo Verde: Grogue
- Cameroon: Odontol
- Central African Republic: Karkanji, Coffee
- Chad: Jus de Fruit, Tea
- Comoros: Singani
- Congo: Lotoko
- Côte d'Ivoire: Akpeteshie
- Democratic Republic of the Congo: Lotoko
- Djibouti: Kabisa (Djiboutian energy drink, there is no national or popular drink in Djibouti due to strict laws from the government.)
- Egypt: Black tea, Sugarcane juice
- Equatorial Guinea: Malamba Juice
- Eritrea: Siwa, coffee, araki, tea
- Ethiopia: Coffee, Tej
- Eswatini: Sibebe
- Gabon: Regab
- Gambia (Republic of The): Ginger Beer
- Ghana: Akpeteshie (National spirit)
- Guinea: Malamba Juice
- Guinea-Bissau: Cana de Cajeu
- Kenya: Tea, Dawa cocktail
- Lesotho: Tholoana
- Liberia: Ginger beer
- Libya: Libyan tea, Arabic coffee
- Madagascar: Rum
- Malawi: Thobwa
- Mali: Green tea
- Mauritania: Tea, Zrig
- Mauritius: Alouda
- Morocco: Moroccan mint tea (atai) is a green tea prepared with spearmint leaves and sugar.
- Mozambique: Tipo Tinto
- Namibia: Oshikundu, Beer (Either brewed domestically or from Germany.)
- Niger: Biere Niger
- Nigeria: Akpeteshie
- Rwanda: Ikigage, sorghum beer
- São Tomé and Príncipe: Palm Wine
- Senegal: Bissap
- Seychelles: Buka
- Sierra Leone: Poyo
- Somalia: No official drink, however Shah hawaash (Cardamom tea), coffee, and camel milk are popular
- South Africa: No official drink but Beer, Springbokkie and Boeber are common. Umqombothi a traditional Nguni sorghum beer is a popular drink to celebrate special ceremonies, and more recently rooibos or "redbush" tea is referred to as the unofficial national drink.
- South Sudan: Araqi
- Sudan: No official drink, however Roselle tea, Araqi, Gongolez (baobab drink), Hulu-Murr (spiced sorghum beverage) and Aradaib (tamarind) are popular
- Togo: Tchakpallo
- Tunisia: Tea
- Uganda: Waragi
- United Republic of Tanzania: Konyagi, tea, coffee
- Zambia: Munkoyo
- Zimbabwe: Chibuku

== Asia ==
=== East ===
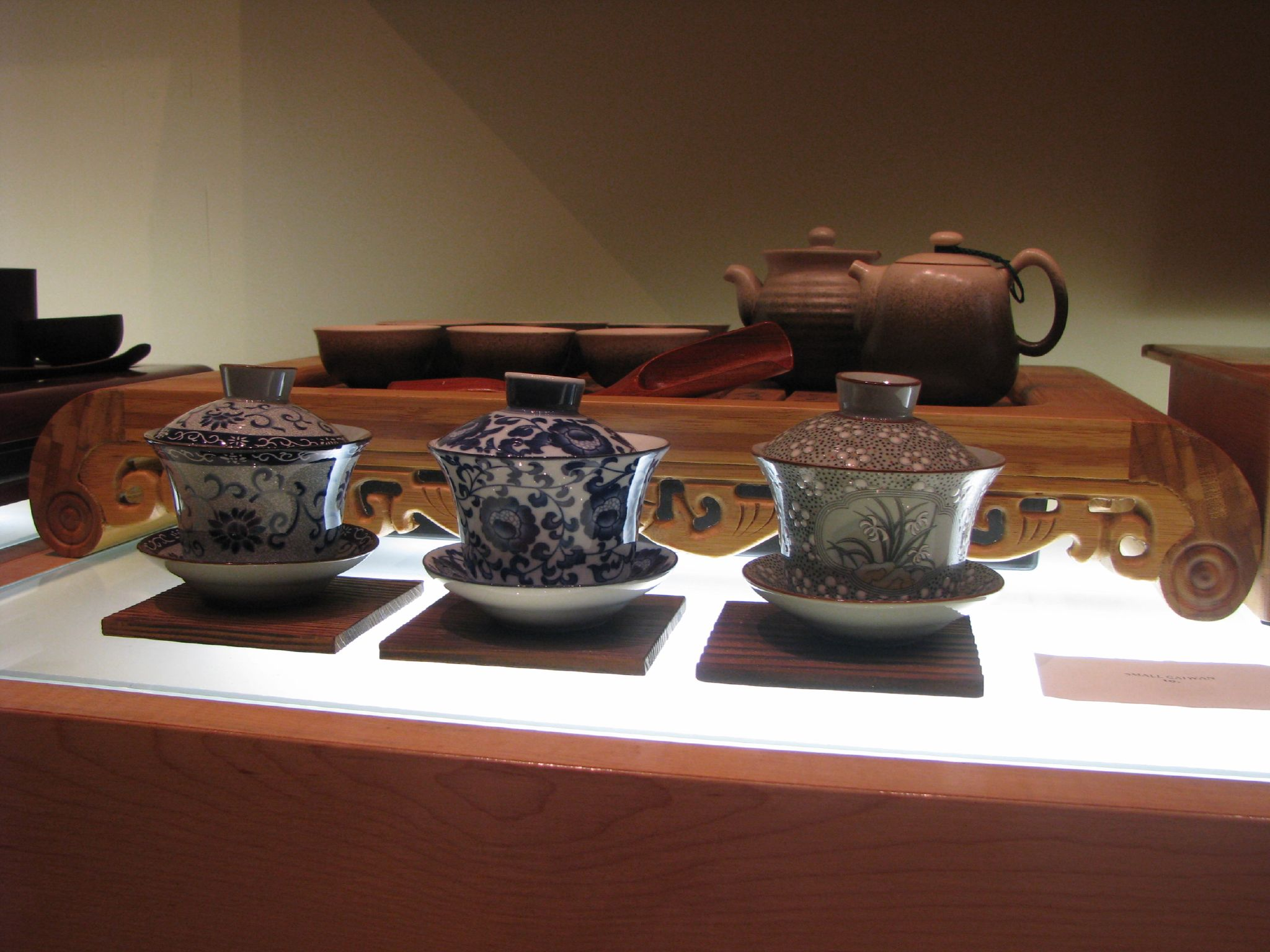
A classical Chinese tea set and three gaiwan.

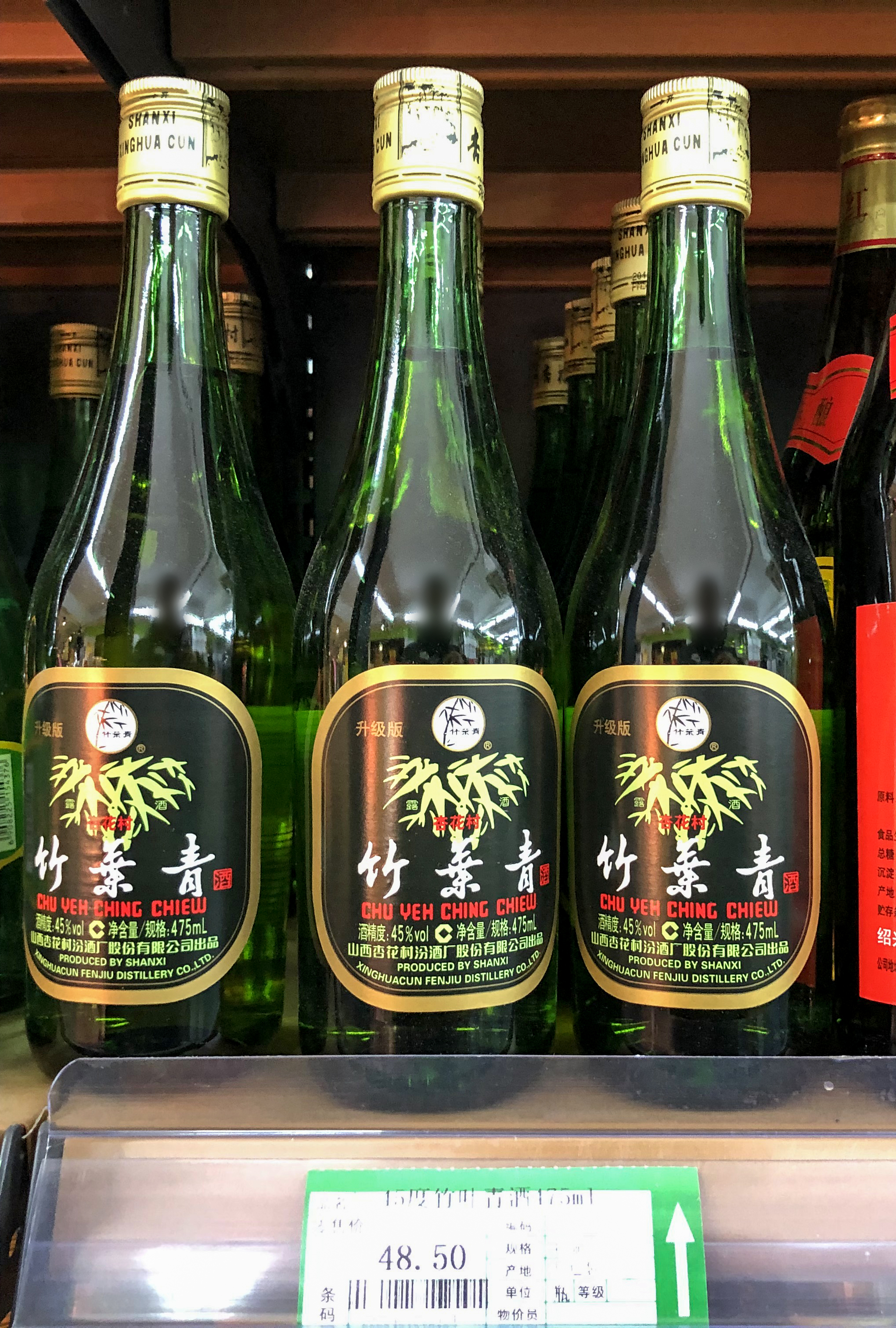
Bottles of Zhuyeqing (Chu Yeh Ching) baijiu produced in Shanxi, China.

- China: Tea has been a vital part of the Chinese culture for thousands of years, and the country is considered to have the earliest records of tea consumption, with possible records dating back to the 10th century BC. Depending on different traditional methods in processing the tea leaves, Chinese tea can be classified into at least six distinct categories: white tea, yellow tea, green tea, oolong tea, black tea and post-fermented tea (dark tea).

The Chinese national liquor, Baijiu (Chinese: 白酒; pinyin: báijiǔ; lit. 'white (clear) liquor'), is a distilled alcoholic beverage made from various types of grains - including rice, glutinous rice, wheat, barley, and millet. - and was first made 5,000 years ago. Baijiu can be broken down into five main aroma categories: strong, light, sauce (soy, specifically), rice, and mixed.
- Hong Kong: Hong Kong-style milk tea, whose unique tea making technique is listed as an "Intangible Cultural Heritage" by the United Nations
- Macau: Coffee (typically served with condensed milk) and tea

- Japan: Green Tea. Tea consumption became popular among the gentry during the 12th century, after the publication of Eisai's Kissa Yōjōki. Uji, with its strategic location near the capital at Kyoto, became Japan's first major tea-producing region during this period. Beginning in the 13th and 14th centuries, Japanese tea culture developed the distinctive features for which it is known today, and the Japanese tea ceremony emerged as a key component of that culture.

Sake, also referred to as Japanese rice wine, is an alcoholic beverage made by fermenting rice that has been polished to remove the bran.

- Ryukyu Islands: Awamori, a traditional Okinawan distilled liquor made from long-grain indica rice
- Mongolia: Airag (Mongolian: айраг [ˈai̯rəɡ]), or in some areas tsegee, is a fermented dairy product traditionally made from mare's milk. The drink remains important to the peoples of the Central Asian steppes, of Huno-Bulgar, Turkic and Mongol origin: Kazakhs, Bashkirs, Kalmyks, Kyrgyz, Mongols, and Yakuts. A 1982 source reported 230,000 horses were kept in the Soviet Union specifically for producing milk to make into kumis (otherwise known as airag).
- North Korea: On June 18, 2019, Kim Jong-un designated Pyongyang Soju, an alcoholic beverage that embodies the "innocent and tender hearts" of the North Korean people, as the national beverage of North Korea, according to a state propaganda service. Soju is a clear, colorless distilled beverage of Korean origin.
- South Korea: Soju (/ˈsoʊdʒuː/; from Korean: 소주; 燒酒 [so.dʑu]) is a clear, colorless distilled beverage of Korean origin. It is usually consumed neat, and its alcohol content varies from about 16.8% to 53% alcohol by volume (ABV). Most brands of soju are made in South Korea. While soju is traditionally made from rice, wheat, or barley, modern producers often replace rice with other starches such as potatoes, sweet potatoes, or tapioca.. The iced americano is also considered an unofficial national beverage of South Korea.
- Taiwan: Bubble tea (also known as Bubble Milk Tea, Pearl Milk Tea, or Boba) is a Taiwanese tea-based drink invented in the 1980s.

=== Southeast ===
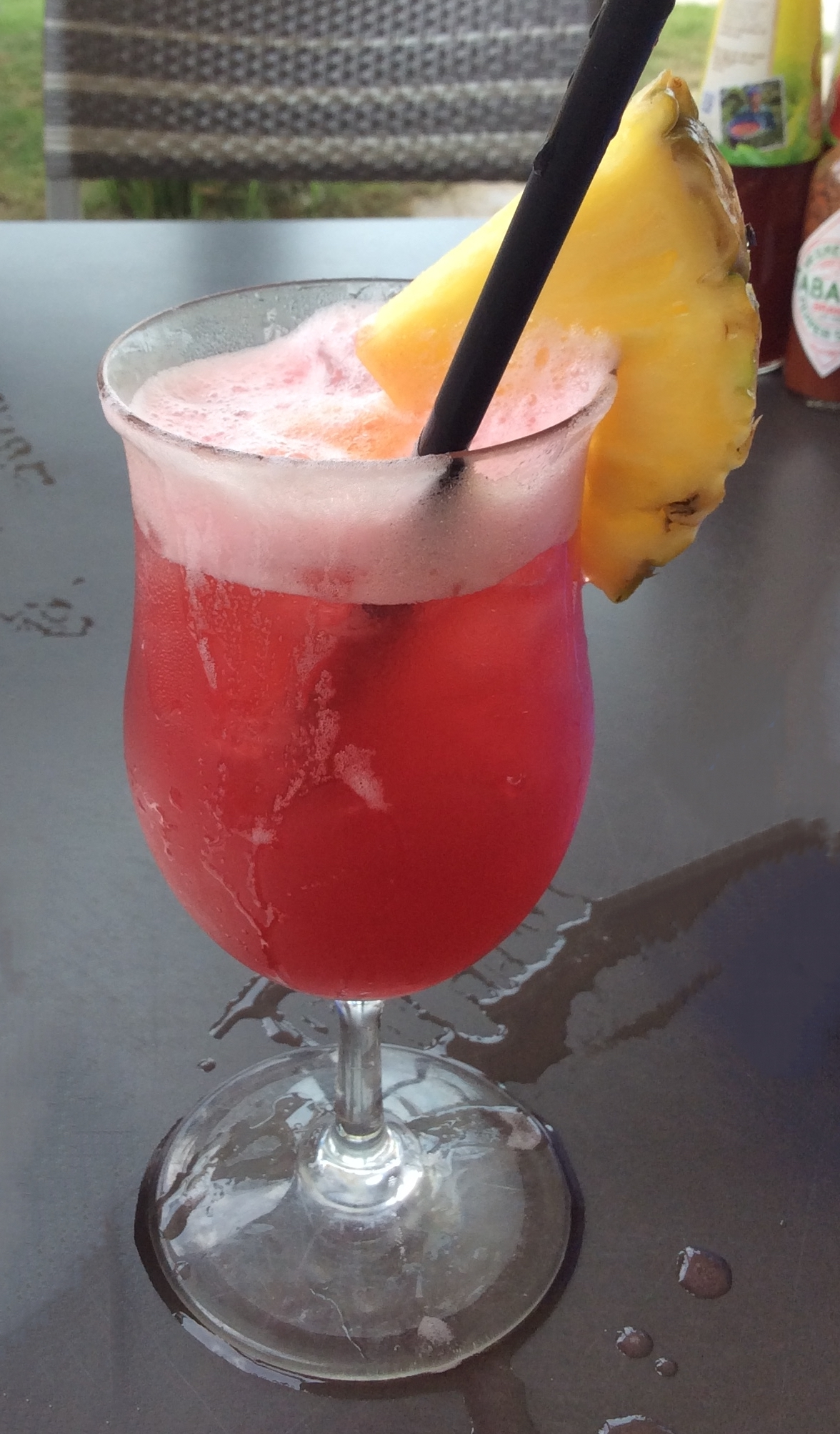
Singapore Sling, a gin-based sling cocktail from the city-state Singapore.

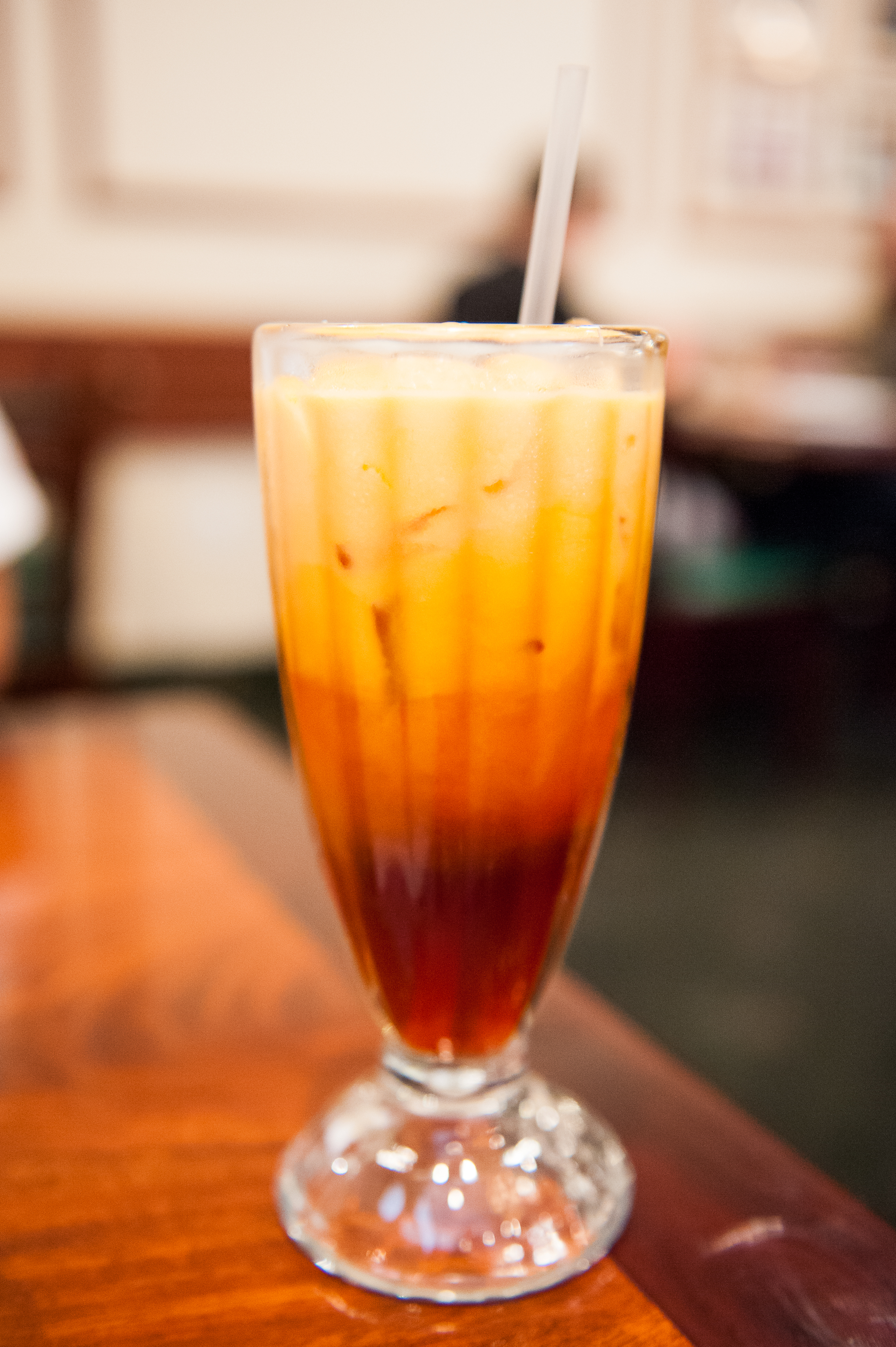
Thai iced tea is a popular drink in Thailand and in many parts of the world.

- Brunei: There is no national drink, but Air Batu Campur (ABC) is popular among citizens.
- Cambodia: Teuk tnaot chhouk, a palm wine
- Indonesia: Es teler, a sweet iced concoction created by Murniati Widjaja, who won a competition to come up with a national drink for Indonesia in 1982.
- Laos: Lao-Lao (Lao: ເຫລົ້າລາວ) is a Laotian rice whisky produced in Laos. Along with Beerlao, lao-Lao is a staple drink in Laos. The name lao-Lao is not the same word repeated twice, but two different words pronounced with different tones: the first, ເຫລົ້າ, means "alcohol" and is pronounced with a low-falling tone in the standard dialect, while the second, ລາວ, means Laotian ("Lao") and is pronounced with a high(-rising) tone.
- Malaysia: Teh tarik (literally "pulled tea") is a hot milk tea beverage which can be commonly found in restaurants, outdoor stalls, and kopi tiams. Teh tarik's name is derived from the pouring process of "pulling" the drink during preparation, and is made from a strong brew of black tea blended with condensed milk. Teh tarik is considered Malaysia's national drink.
- Myanmar: Lahpet yay is brewed from a mix of fermented or pickled tea, sweetened condensed milk, and evaporated milk. It is traditionally served hot in Burmese tea houses - open air, bustling, street corner places.
- Philippines: Beer (San Miguel Beer).
- Singapore: Kopi is a type of traditional highly caffeinated black coffee, sometimes served with milk and/or sugar. This drink has Hainanese roots, many of whom migrated south to Singapore during the 19th to 20th centuries. Kopi is also otherwise known as Nanyang coffee., with Nanyang meaning ‘South Sea’ in Mandarin, and usually is a reference to Southeast Asia. Kopi is recognized to be culturally significant and part of the everyday diet and lifestyle of many Singaporeans.
- The Singapore Sling is a gin-based sling cocktail from Singapore, and was created around 1915 by Ngiam Tong Boon (Chinese: 严崇文; pinyin: Yán Chóng-Wén), also of Hainanese descent, at the Long Bar in Raffles Hotel, Singapore, and is considered the national cocktail.
- Tiger Beer is considered the national beer of Singapore.
- The Milo dinosaur is a Singaporean chocolate malt–based beverage composed of a cup of iced Milo with undissolved Milo powder added on top of it. It is usually served cold to prevent the powder from immediately dissolving in the drink. The drink originated from Indian Singaporean eateries in Singapore during the 1990s, and it is now most commonly found in mamak stalls, kopitiams, and hawker centres from all ethnic groups in Singapore.
- Thailand: Thai tea is a Thai drink made from tea, milk, and sugar, and served hot or cold. It is popular in Southeast Asia and is served in many restaurants that serve Thai food. When served cold it is known as Thai iced tea. Another highly popular drink is Krating Daeng, an energy drink which was first introduced in 1976. In Thai, daeng means red, and a krating is a large species of wild bovine native to South Asia. Krating Daeng inspired the creation of the Western drink Red Bull.
- Timor-Leste: arrak, a local alcoholic drink made from fermented palm sap or rice, the beer Bierra Leste, and the coffee Timor.
- Vietnam: Primarily Vietnamese iced coffee (cà phê đá), and to a lesser extent Rượu nếp, Vietnamese rice wine, made from glutinous rice that has been fermented with the aid of yeast and steamed in a banana leaf.

=== South ===
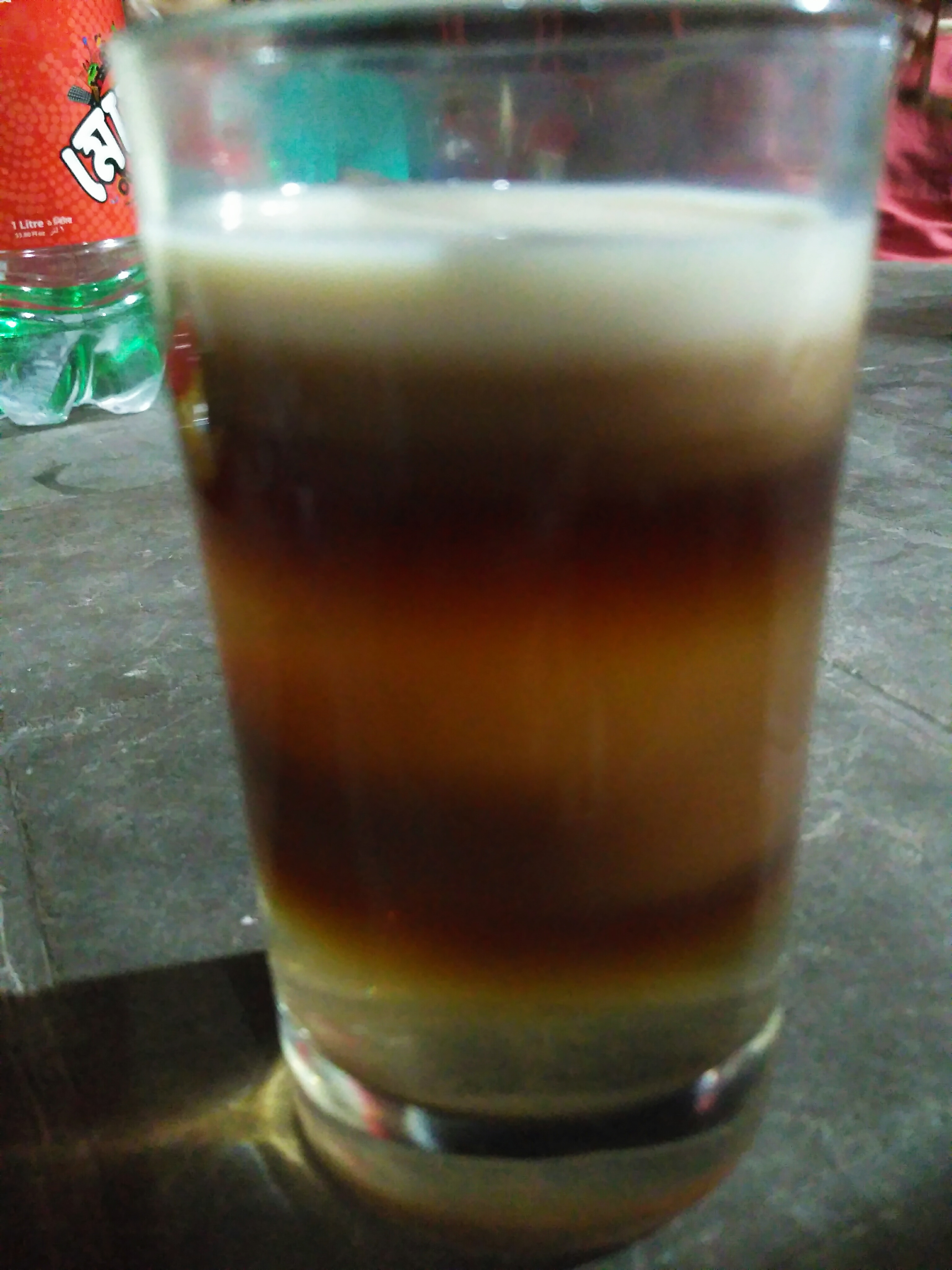
The 7-layered tea of Bangladesh.

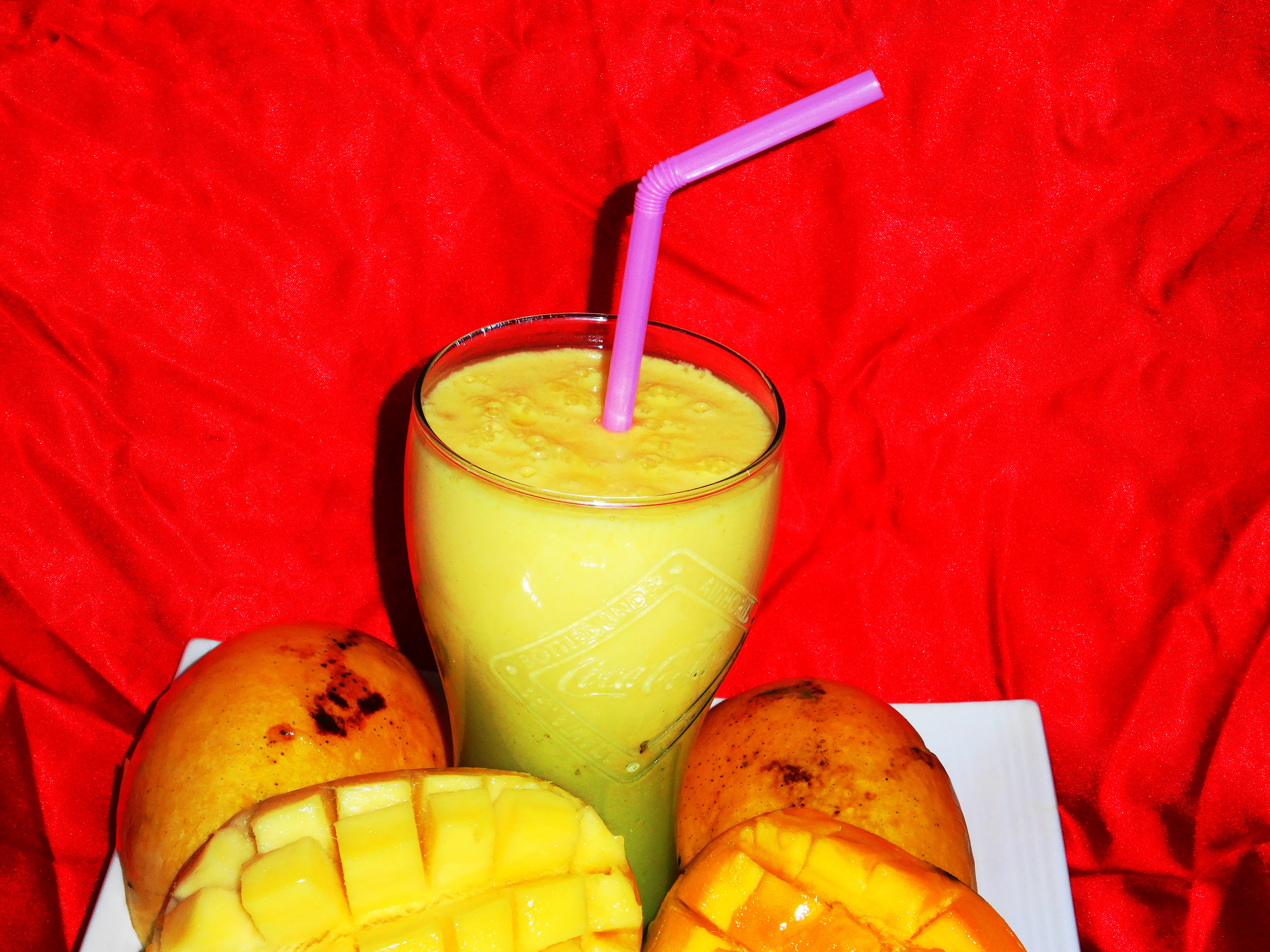
The popular Indian drink mango lassi.

- Bangladesh: Tea (Bengali: চা, romanized: Cha) is considered to be the national drink of Bangladesh, with government bodies such as the Bangladesh Tea Board and the Bangladesh Tea Research Institute supporting the production, certification, and exportation of the tea trade in the country. Recently, new types of tea, such as the seven color tea or seven-layer tea, (Bengali: সাত রং চা, romanized: Shat Rong Cha) has popped up as a well-known beverage of the country's Sylhet Division. Romesh Ram Gour invented the seven-layer tea after discovering that different tea leaves have different densities. Each layer contrasts in color and taste, ranging from syrupy sweet to spicy clove. The result is an alternating dark/light band pattern throughout the drink, giving the tea its name.
- Bhutan: Ara, or Arag, (Tibetan and Dzongkha: ཨ་རག་; Wylie: a-rag; "alcohol, liquor") is a traditional alcoholic beverage consumed in Bhutan. Ara is made from native and high-altitude tolerant barley, rice, maize, millet, or wheat, and may be either fermented or distilled. The beverage is usually a clear, creamy, or white color.
- India: Tea is the most widely consumed beverage in India but can not be considered the national drink. Lassi or Chaas is another yogurt-based drink and can be sweet or salty. Lassi or Chaas is a blend of yogurt, water, spices and sometimes fruit like mango. While the Masala chai is a hot, sweet tea popular throughout the subcontinent and is a combination of brewed black tea, aromatic spices, and herbs, milk and sugar. In southern India, the iconic beverage is Kaapi, also known as Indian filter coffee, which is made by mixing frothed and boiled milk with coffee brewed through a metal filter. Traditional alcoholic drinks like toddy and feni remain popular in various parts of the country, along with western-style beers, liquors and wines, with Kingfisher beer being the most widely-recognized Indian beer brand.
- Maldives: It can be said that the Maldives have two national drinks. Firstly, due to their history and location near the Indian Subcontinent, sai (tea) is a Maldivian favorite. Secondly, as the Maldives are truly an island nation, raa (toddy tapped from palm trees) is also has its place in the national identity of the Maldives. Sometimes raa is left to ferment and is thus slightly alcoholic – the closest any Maldivian gets to alcohol.
- Nepal: Raksi is a strong drink, clear like vodka or gin, tasting somewhat like Japanese sake. It is usually made from kodo millet (kodo) or rice; different grains produce different flavors. The Limbus, for whom it is a traditional beverage, drink an enormous amount of Tongba and raksi served with pieces of pork, water buffalo or goat meat sekuwa. For the Newars, aylaa is indispensable during festivals and various religious rituals as libation, prasad or sagan.
- Pakistan: Sugarcane juice
- Sri Lanka: Tea

=== Central ===
- Afghanistan: Technically there isn't an official beverage
- Kazakhstan: Kumis, fermented horse milk
- Kyrgyzstan: maksym or jarma, both of which are made out of barley
- Tajikistan: Green tea
- Turkmenistan: Chal
- Uzbekistan: Green tea

=== West ===
- Armenia: Oghi, Armenian wine, Ararat
- Azerbaijan: Black tea
- Bahrain: Coffee
- Georgia: Chacha and red wine
- Iraq: Coffee, arak, and mint tea
- Iran: Doogh, Persian yogurt drink and black tea, Aragh Sagi (underground)
- Israel: Arak, mint lemonade (limonana), wine

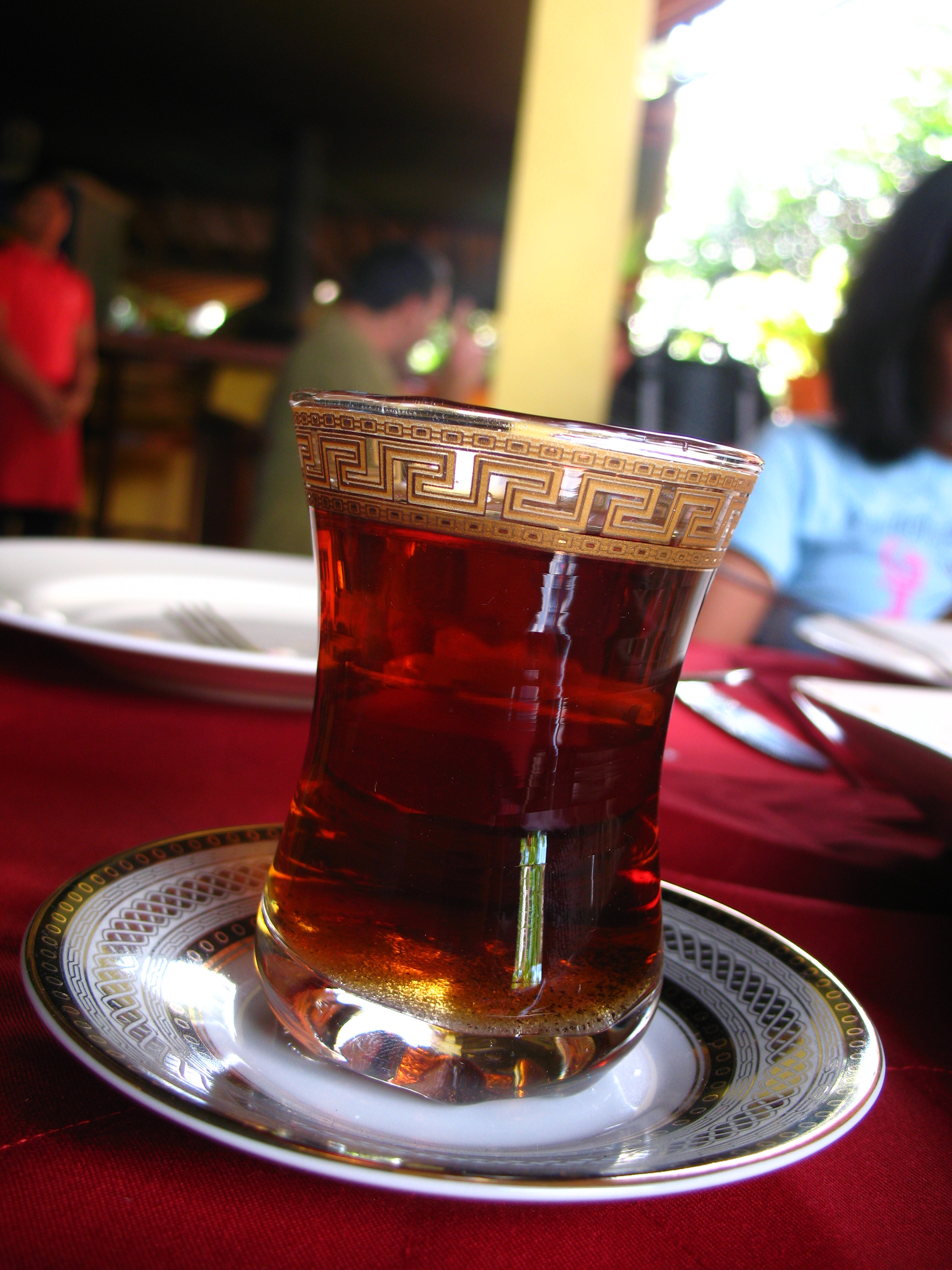
Per capita, people in Turkey drink more tea than in any other nation.

- Jordan: Arabic coffee, non-sweetened and in small shots, mint lemonade, and arak
- Kuwait: Arabic coffee (kahwah)
- Lebanon: Arak
- Oman: Arabic coffee
- Palestine: Coffee, arak, mint lemonade
- Qatar: Arabic coffee
- Saudi Arabia: Arabic coffee
- Syria: Coffee and arak
- Turkey: Raki; Türk Kahvesi; tea; ayran (as proclaimed by Prime Minister Tayyip Erdogan in 2013) is a non-alcoholic yogurt drink
- United Arab Emirates: Arabic coffee
- Yemen: Arabic coffee, being one of the oldest known places to grow coffee, Qishr, and Naqe'e Al Zabib

== Oceania ==
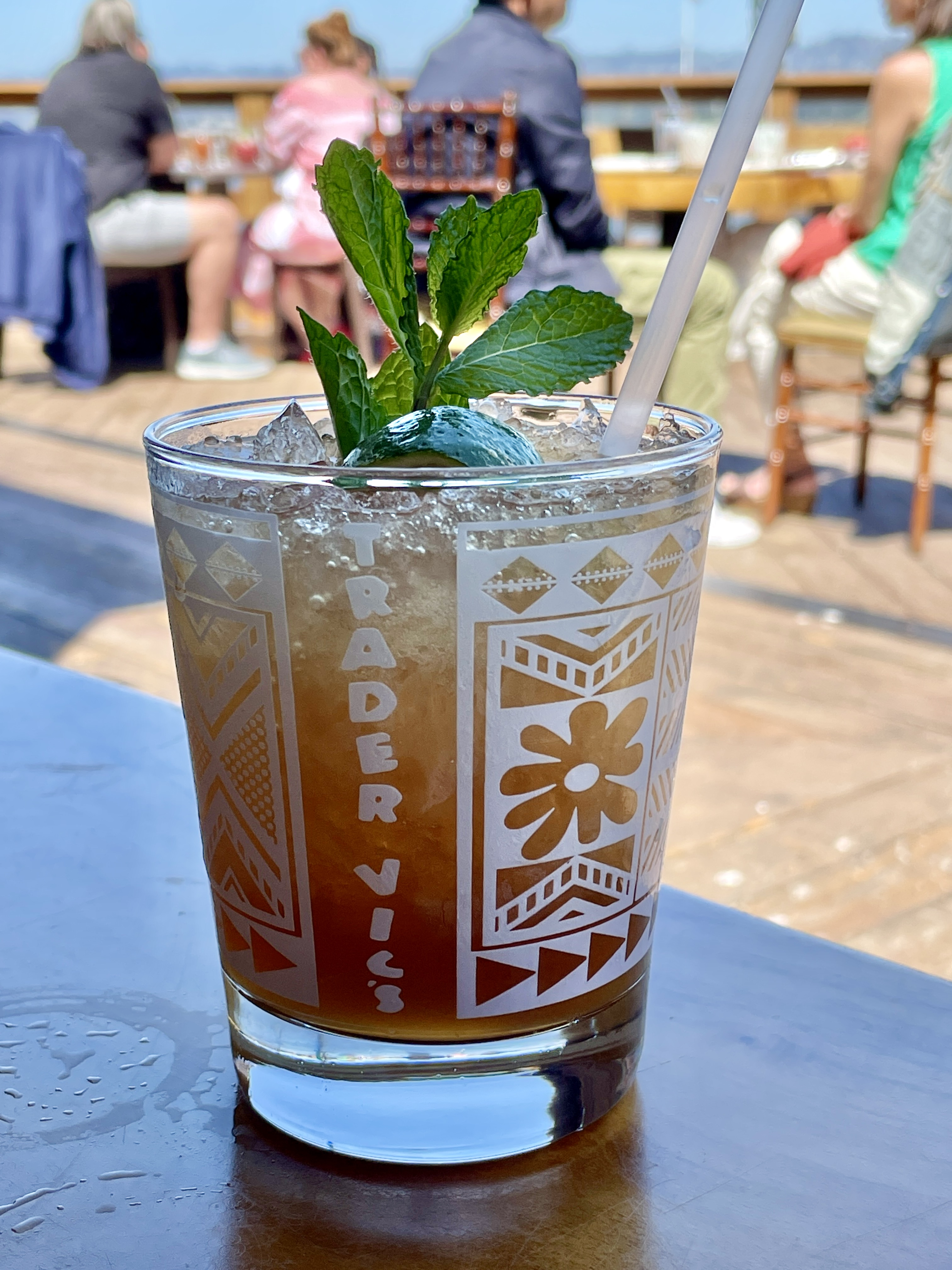
Mai Tai is a cocktail made of rum, Curaçao liqueur, orgeat syrup, and lime juice. It is one of the characteristic cocktails in Tiki culture.

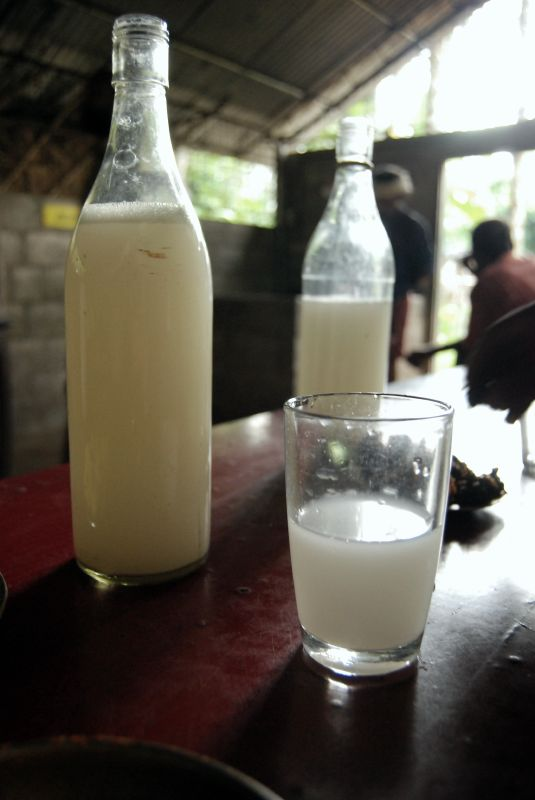
Palm wine is an alcoholic beverage created from the sap of various species of palm trees such as the palmyra, date palms, and coconut palms. It is known by various names in different regions and is common in various parts of Africa, the Caribbean, South America, South Asia, Southeast Asia, and Micronesia.

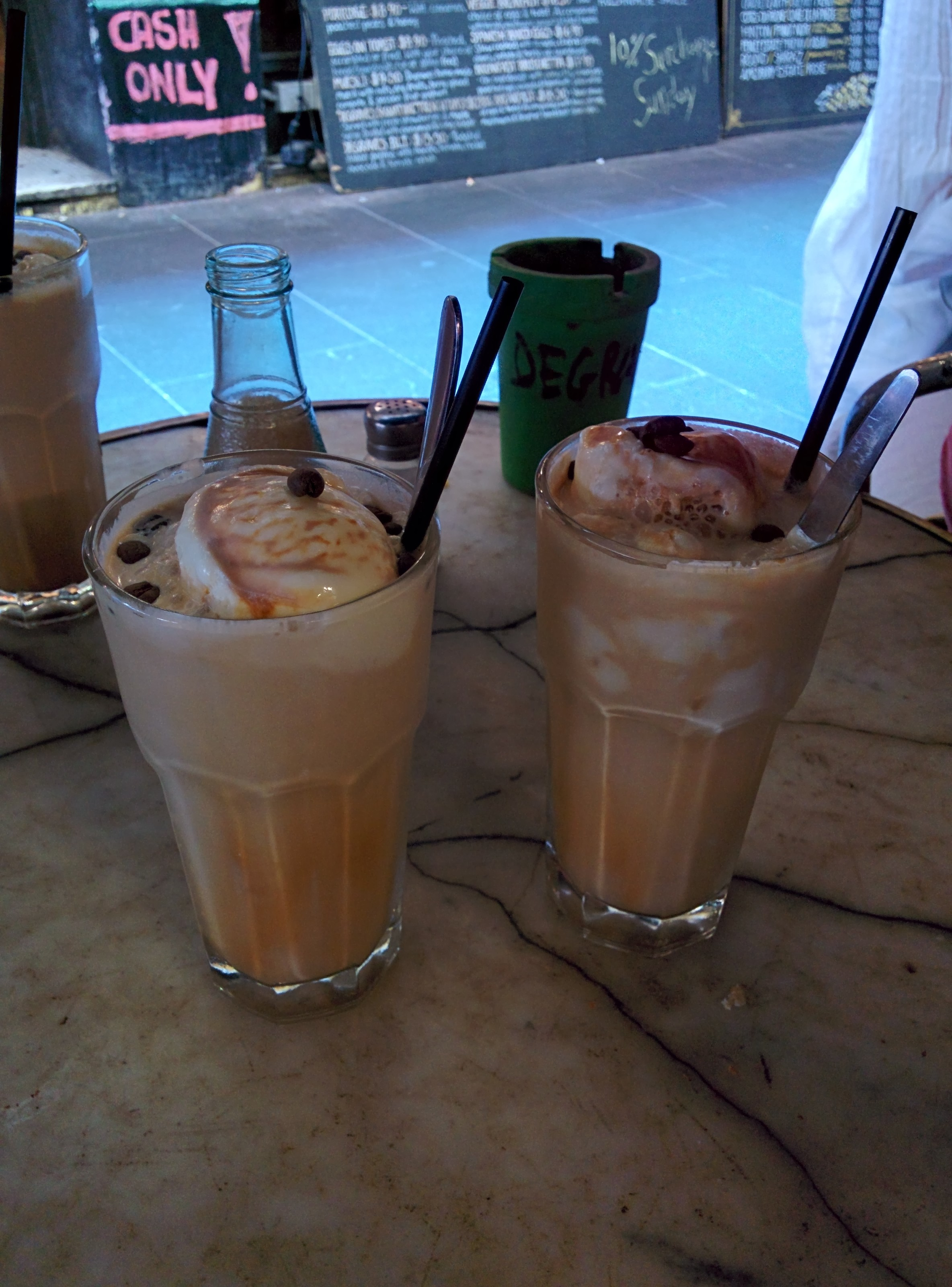
Australian iced coffee served with ice-cream and coffee beans

- American Samoa (US): Kava
- Australia: Australia has quickly become the premier country in the world for coffee, thanks to the immigration of Italian and Greek migrants after World War II. Coffee has become a dominating factor in Australian culture. In Australia, iced coffee is common. An ABC News article published in 2018 described lemon, lime, and bitters (LLB) as "Australia's national drink". Lemon, lime, and bitters is a mixed drink made with (clear) lemonade, lime cordial, and Angostura bitters. The lemonade is sometimes substituted with soda water or lemon squash. It was served as a non-alcoholic alternative to "Pink Gin" (gin mixed with Angostura bitters). It is often considered to be a non-alcoholic cocktail (or mocktail) due to its exceedingly low alcohol content, though some establishments consider it to be alcoholic and will not serve it without identification or proof of age. Beer and wine have also been referred to as the unofficial national drinks of Australia.
- Christmas Island (AU): Coffee
- Cocos (Keeling) Islands (AU): Tea
- Cook Islands: Tumunu
- Easter Island: Easter Island Cocktail
- Fiji: Most Fijians would say that Kava is the unofficial national drink of Fiji. Kava (also called "grog" or "yaqona") is drunk at all times of day in both public and private settings. The consumption of the drink is a form of welcome and figures in important socio-political events. Both genders drink kava. Kava is consumed for its sedating effects throughout the Pacific Ocean cultures of Polynesia, including Hawaii, Vanuatu, Melanesia, and some parts of Micronesia. To a lesser extent, it is consumed in nations where it is exported as an herbal medicine.
- French Polynesia: Hinano Lager
- Guam (US): Calamansi Basil Lemonade
- Hawaii (US): Mai tai
- Kiribati: Karewe is a palm wine beverage made from "Toddy" (sap of certain coconut palms) in Kiribati. It is said that "Every male child in Kiribati is expected to learn climbing and toddy cutting from very early age just as a female child is expected to learn cooking and weaving from very early age". It is known by various names in different regions and is common in various parts of Asia, Africa, the Caribbean, South America, and Micronesia. Karewe production by small landholders and individual farmers may promote conservation as palm trees become a source of regular household income that may economically be worth more than the value of timber sold.
- Marshall Islands: Coconut Water
- Micronesia: Sakau
- Nauru: Iced Coffee
- New Caledonia: Wine
- New Zealand: L&P, Instant Coffee
- Niue: Coconut Water
- Norfolk Island (AU): Beer and Wine
- Northern Mariana Islands: Michelob Ultra
- Palau: Coconut Water
- Papua New Guinea: Kava
- Pitcairn Islands: Ti' punch
- Samoa: Kava
- Solomon Islands: Kava
- Tokelau: Kava
- Tonga: Kava is a very important drink in Tonga, and some would also argue that it is their unofficial national drink. In Tonga, kava is like alcohol and drunk nightly at kalapu (Tongan for "club"), which is also called a faikava ("to do kava"). Only men are allowed to drink kava, although women who serve it may be present. The female server is usually an unmarried, young woman called "touʻa." In the past, this was a position reserved for women being courted by an unmarried male, and much respect was shown. These days, it is imperative that the touʻa not be related to anyone in the kalapu, and if someone is found to be a relative of the touʻa, he (not the touʻa) will leave the club for that night; otherwise the brother-sister taboo would make it impossible to talk openly, especially about courtship. Foreign girls, especially volunteer workers from overseas are often invited to be a touʻa for a night. If no female touʻa can be found, or it is such a small, very informal gathering, one of the men will do the job of serving the kava root; this is called fakatangata ("all-man"). See Tongan Kava Ceremony for more information.
- Tuvalu: Kava
- Vanuatu: Kava drink
- Wallis and Futuna: Kava

== Gallery ==
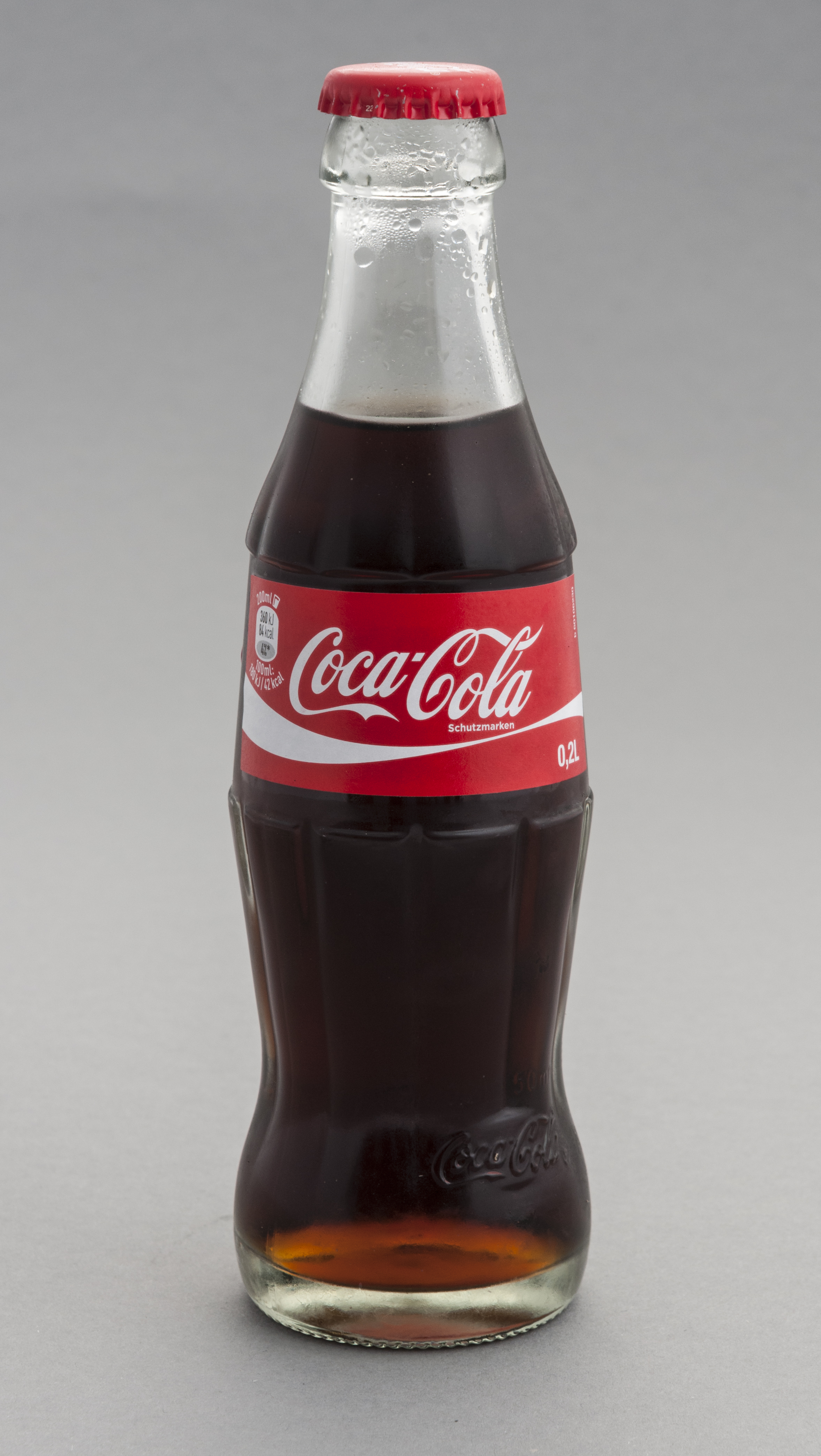
Coca-Cola is thought by many to be a symbol of the US.

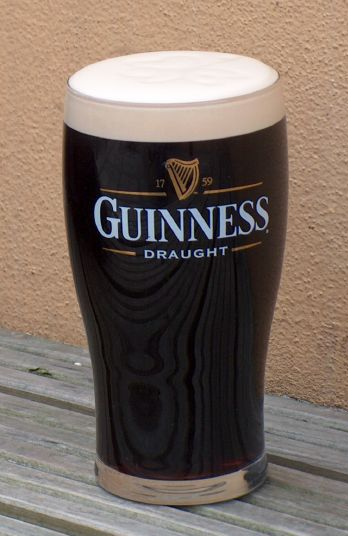
Guinness, a dry stout beer, is strongly associated with Ireland.

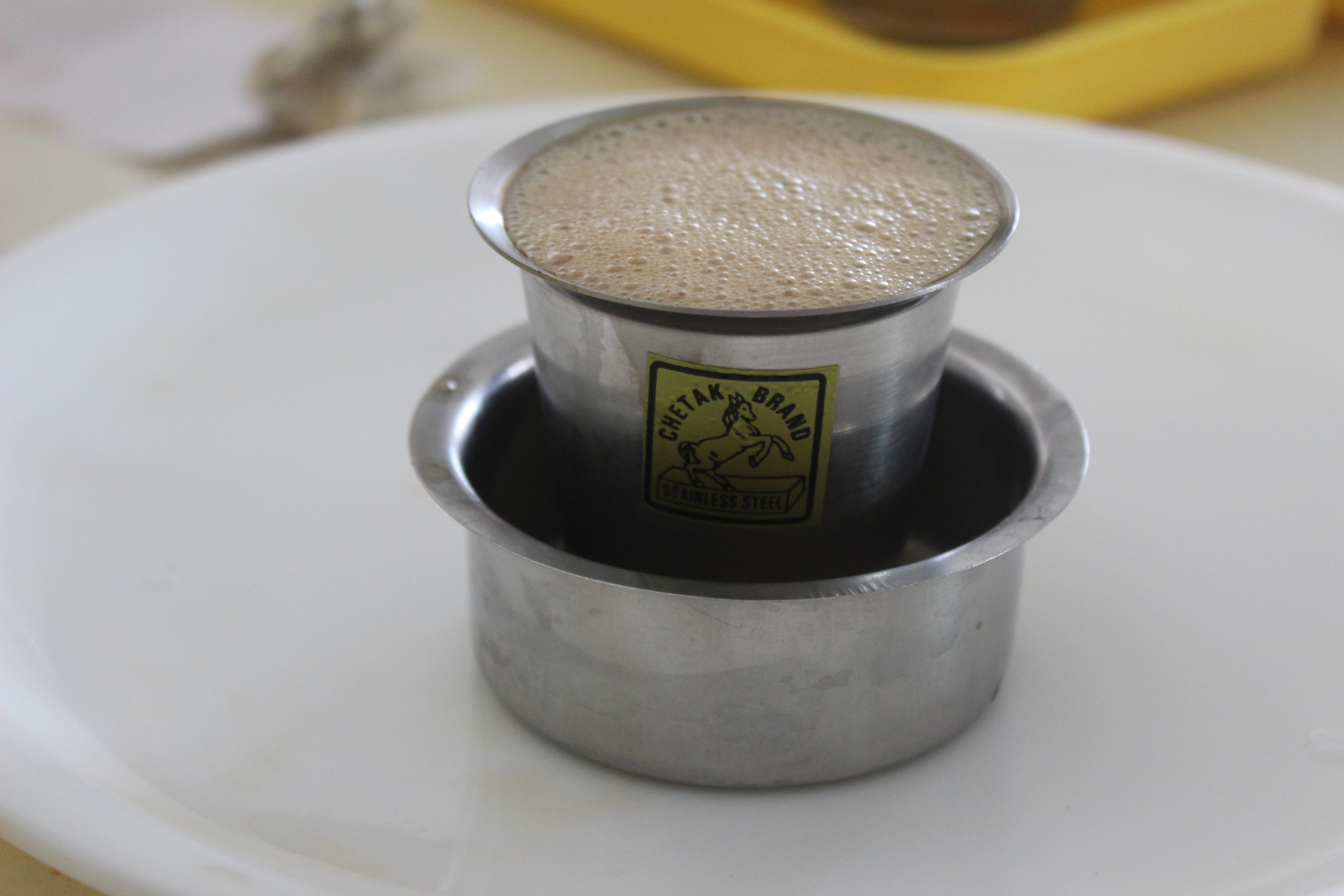
Kaapi, Indian filter coffee.

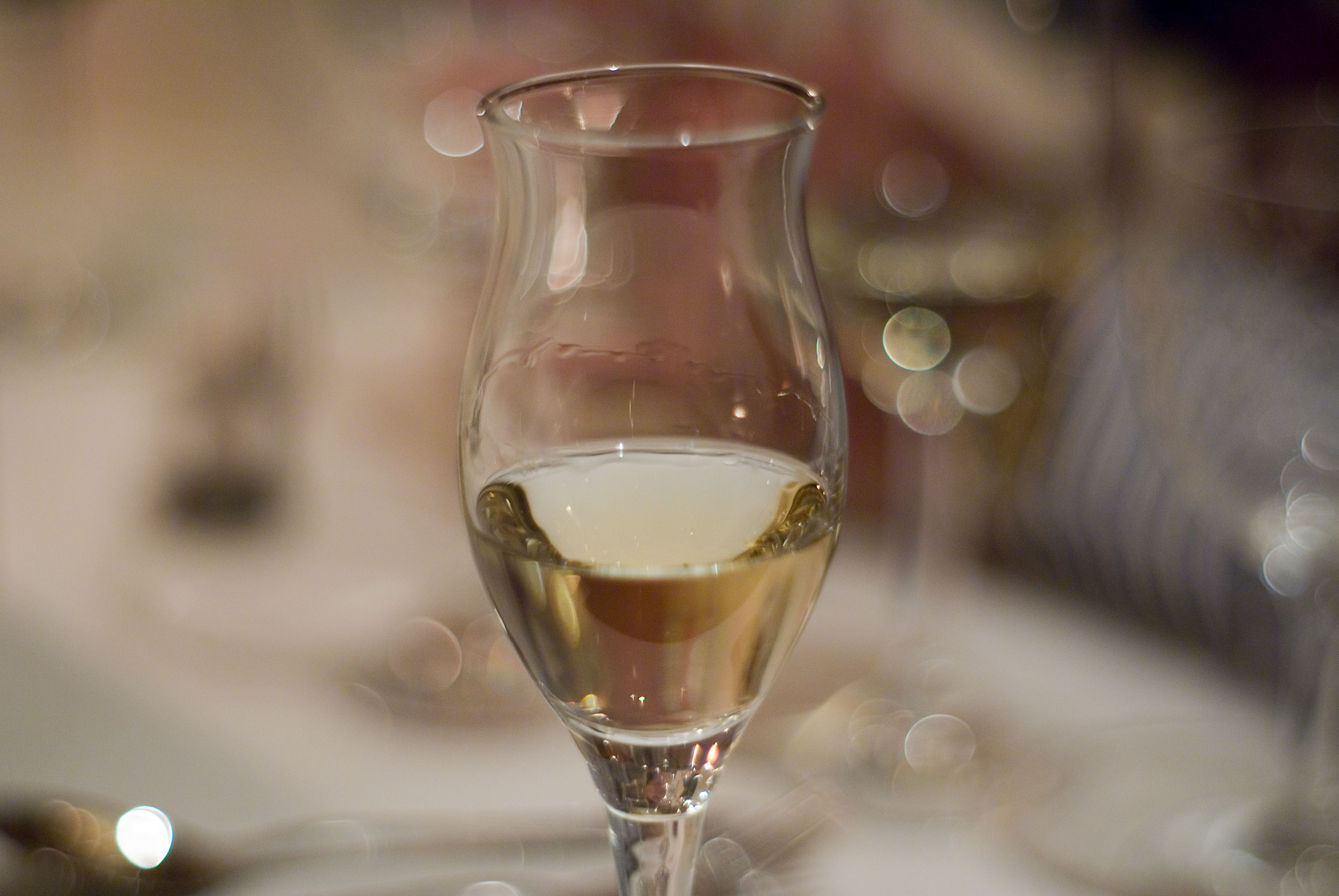
A glass of grappa, a grape-based pomace brandy of Italian origin. Grappa is a protected name in the European Union.

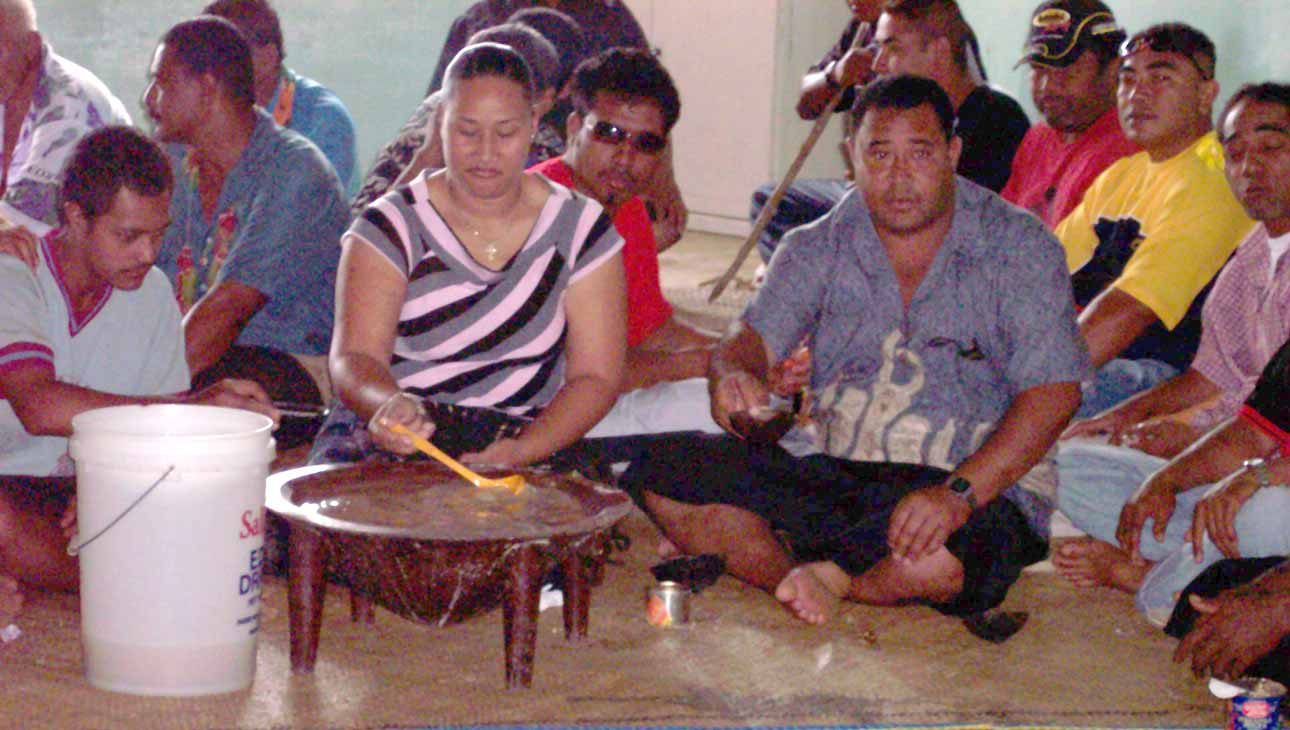
A typical informal faikava in Tonga with the touʻa serving the men.

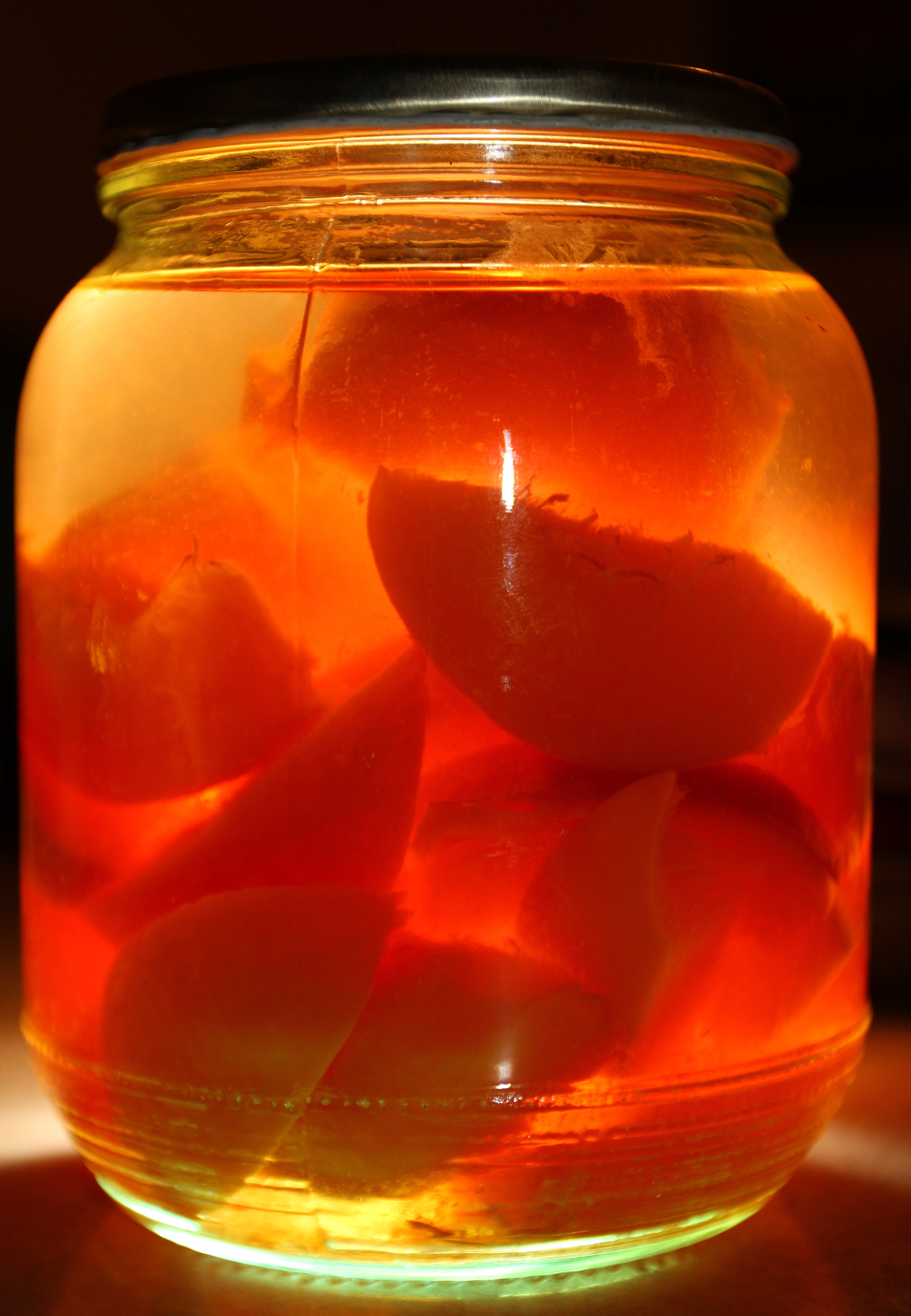
Peach kompot, traditional to several countries in Eastern and Southeastern Europe.

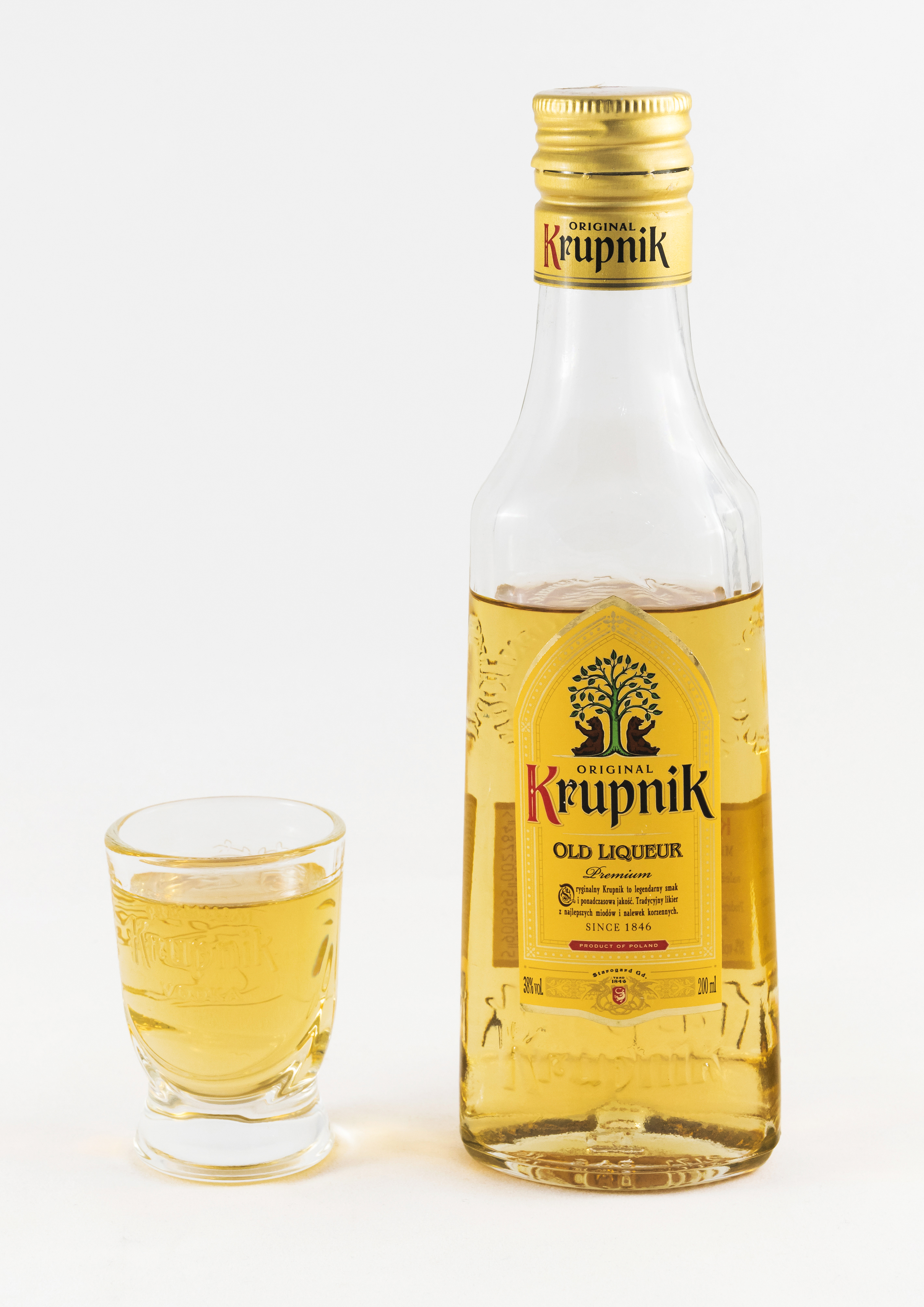
Krupnik, the national drink of Poland.

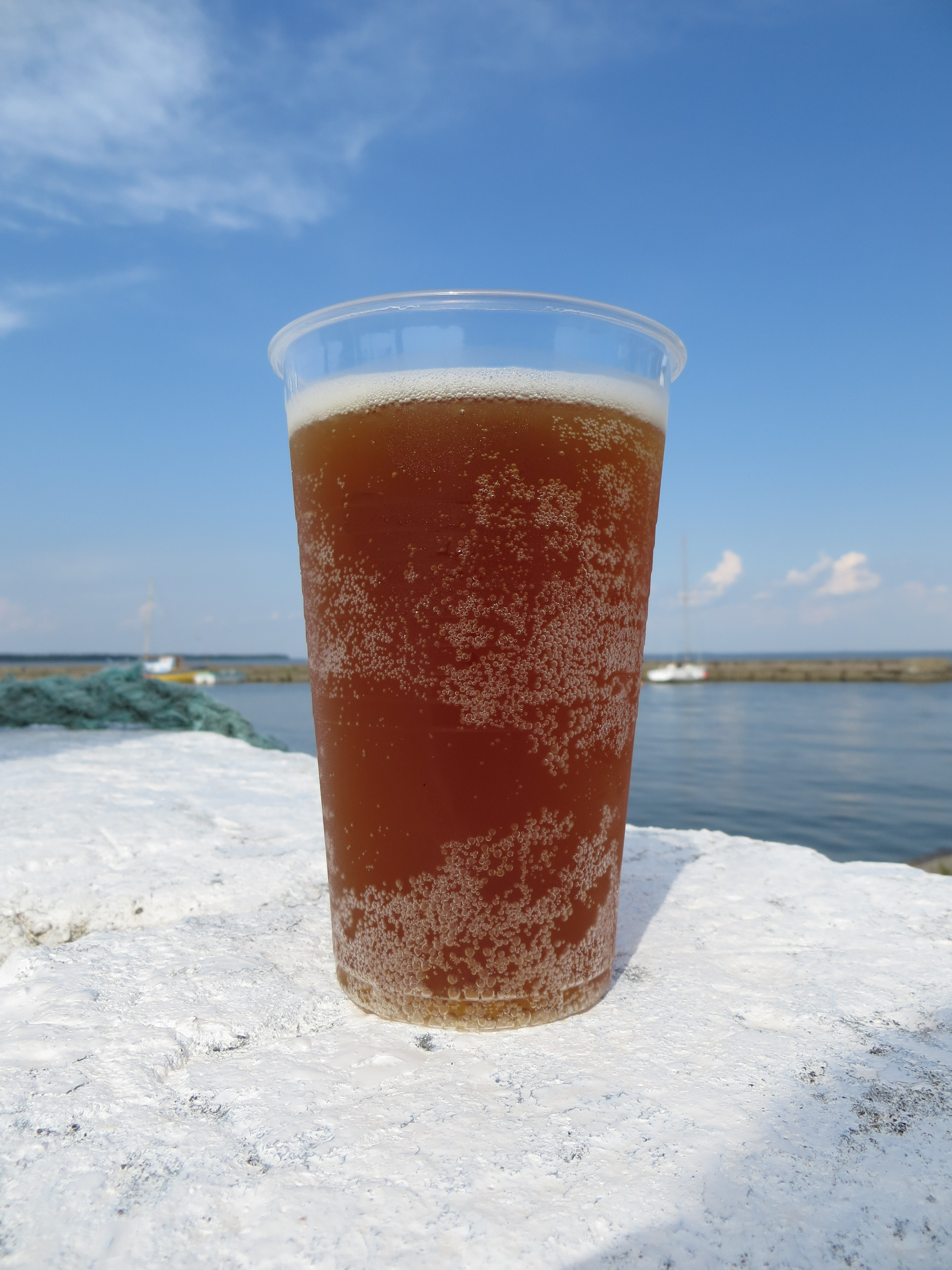
Kvass, popular in the Baltic and Slavic countries.

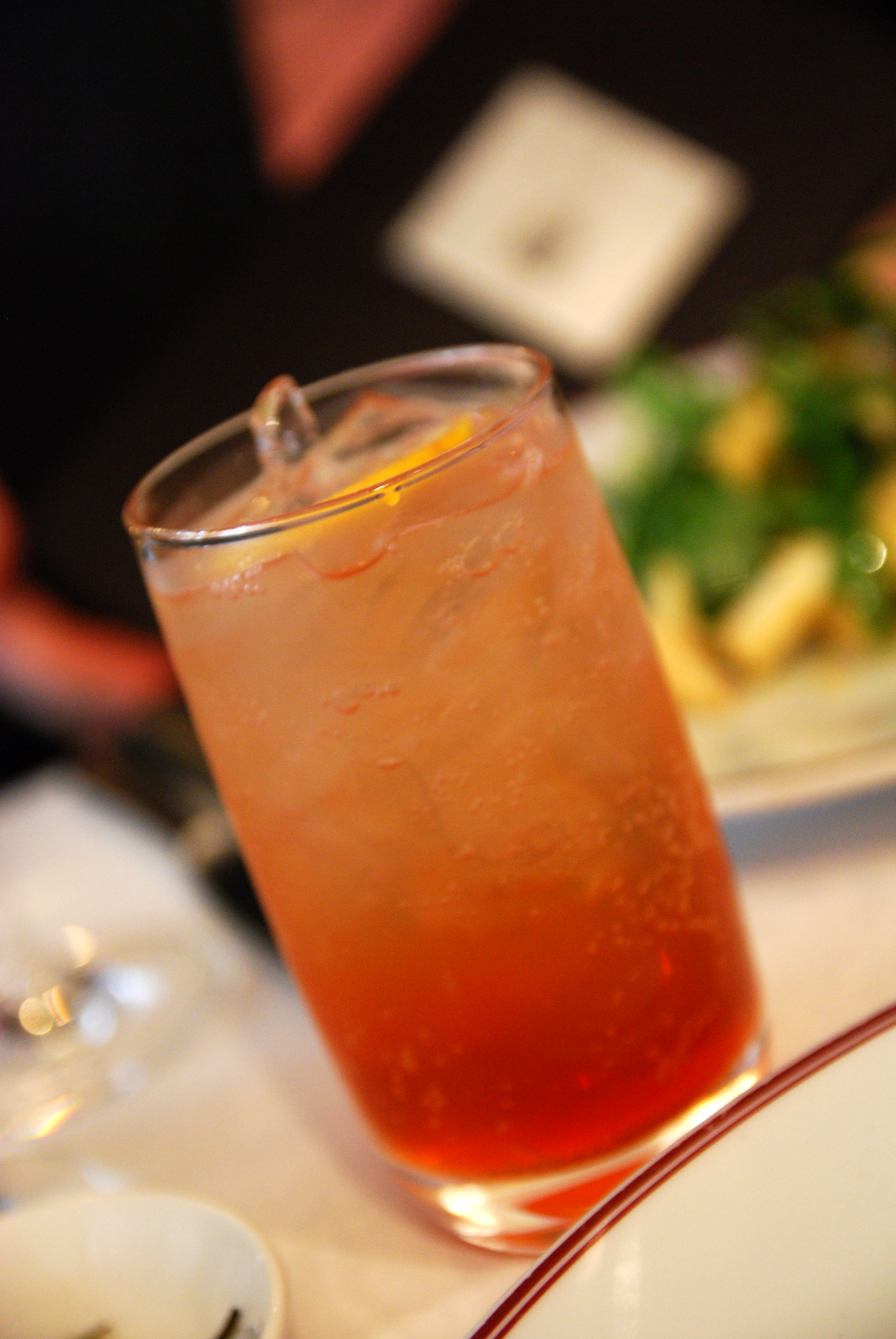
Lemon, lime and bitters is commonly consumed in Australia and New Zealand.

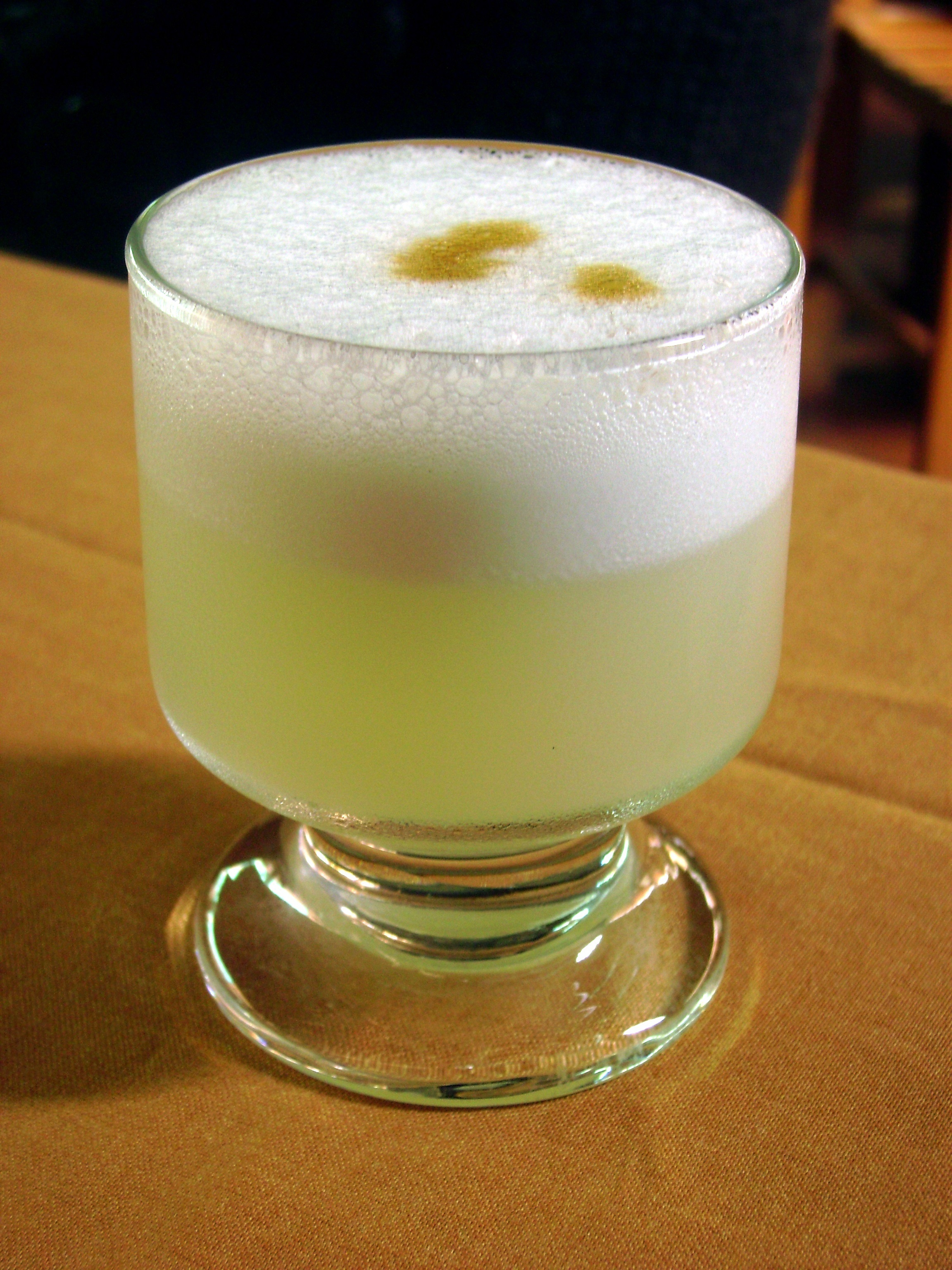
Many in both Peru and Chile consider pisco sour their national drink.

== See also ==
- List of national liquors
- National dish
