= Malamba (drink) =

African alcoholic drink

- Type: Fermented beverage
- Region or state: Central Africa
- Main ingredients: Sugarcane juice

Malamba is a traditional alcoholic beverage in Cameroon, Equatorial Guinea, and Gabon made by fermenting sugarcane juice. The canes are crushed in a mortar, and the juice is left to ferment for approximately two weeks. The flavor and texture is similar to the Latin American drink guarapo. To accelerate the process of fermentation, bark from the Garcinia kola (bitter kola in English, known as essoc or onaé in Cameroon) can be added to the juice. Corn is also sometimes added during the fermentation process to increase the alcohol content. In Gabon, the drink is also known as musungu or vin de canne (cane wine) in French.

== See also ==
- Palm wine
