= Thobwa =

Malawian and Zambian fermented drink

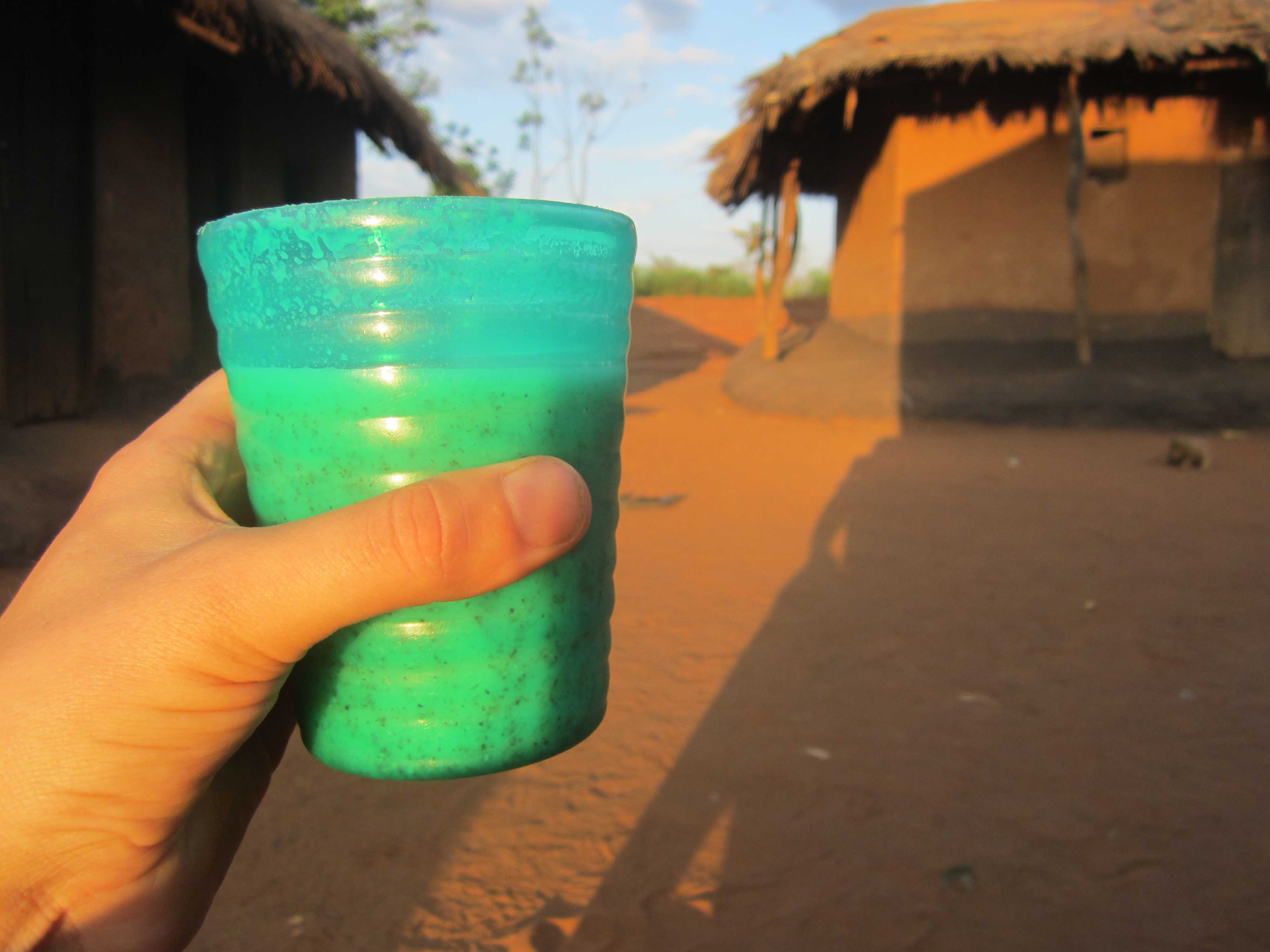
- A cup of thobwa in Malawi
- Type: Fermented drink
- Origin: Southeast Africa
- Color: Milky
- Ingredients: White maize, millet, or sorghum

Thobwa is a Malawian and Zambian fermented drink that has a milky appearance, a cereal taste and a grainy texture. It is made from white maize and millet or sorghum and is popular in all parts of the country. The name thobwa means "sweet beer", and although it is non-alcoholic it can be left for five days and it will turn to mowa or beer.

== Preparation ==
Thobwa is made by boiling water with m'gaiwa (whole grain white maize flour) until it makes phala (porridge). More water is then added and brought to a rolling boil for about 15 minutes. After this the mixture is left to cool until warm and at this point a handful of maŵele (millet flour) is added. This mixture is now left in a mbiya (big clay pot) in a cool place for two days before being served as thobwa.

== Drinking and etiquette ==
Because thobwa is made using maize flour it has a cereal taste and is filling. Many Malawians use this drink as energy for the day and it is sold everywhere out of recycled plastic bottles in the towns/cities, and from clay pots in the villages. Thobwa can be found all year round, however it is mainly served in the hot months (September-November), and is particularly served to welcome guests visiting a compound. Huge quantities of thobwa are consumed at weddings as a celebratory drink.

== Gallery ==
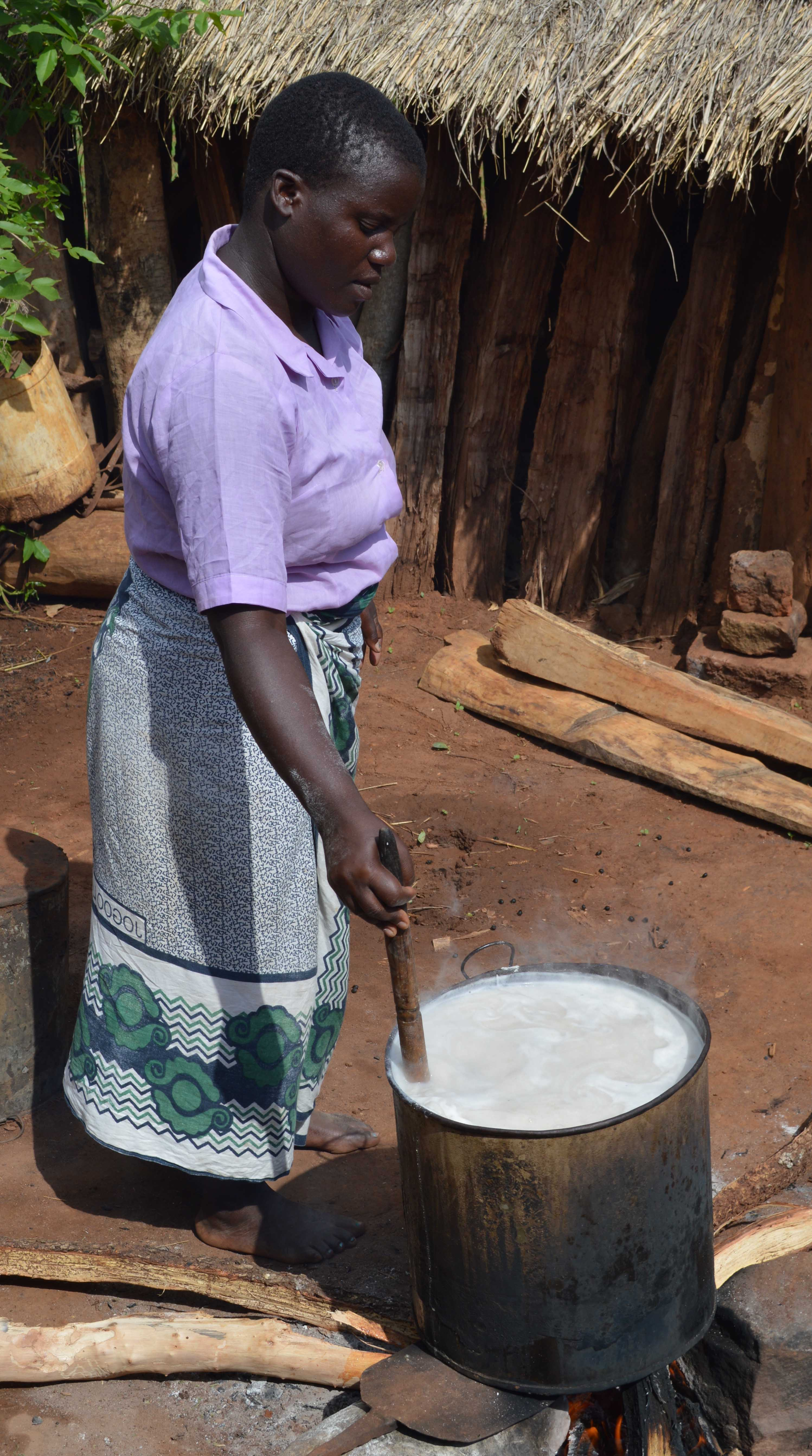
A woman making thobwa in Champiti village, Malawi

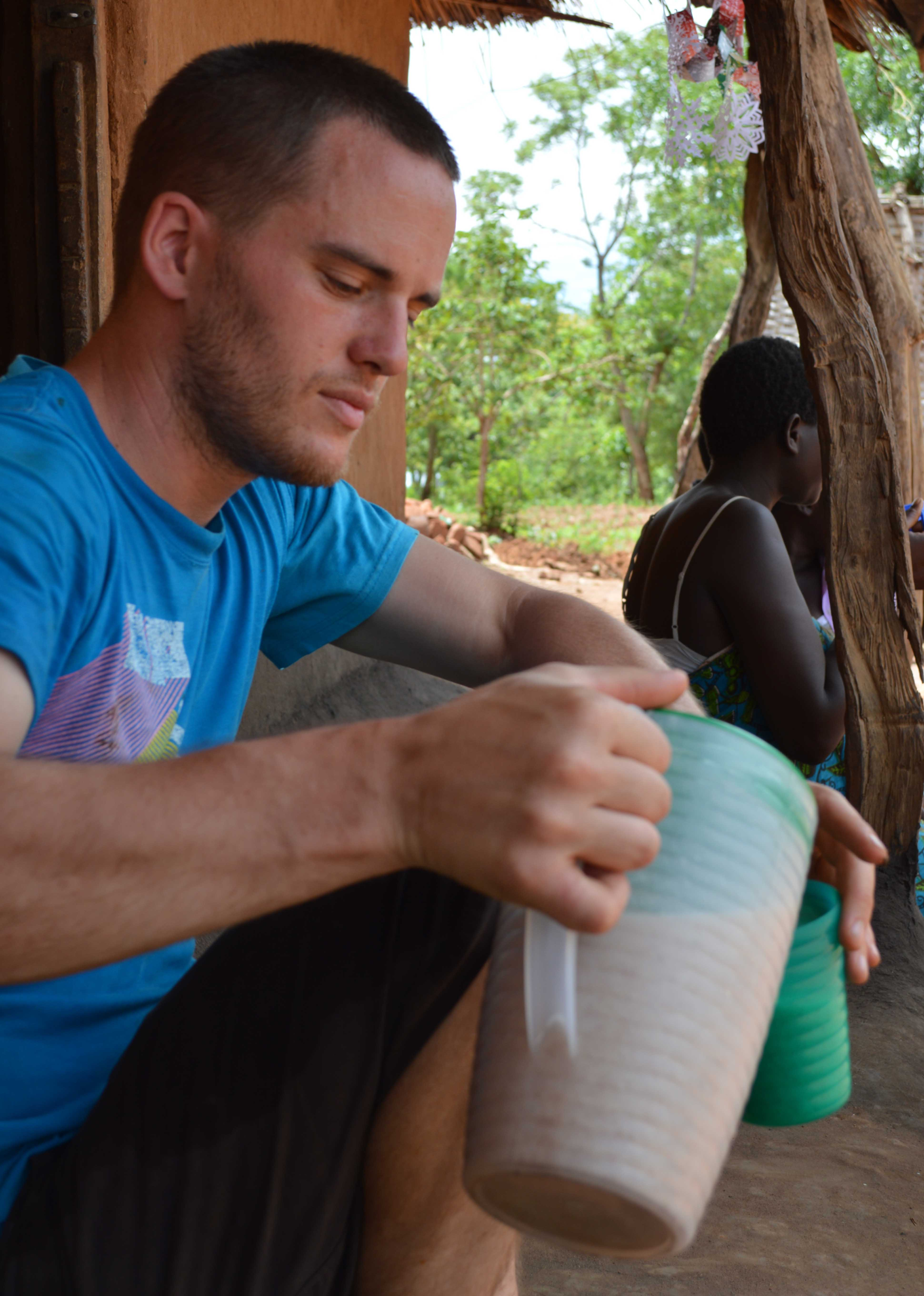
A guest drinking thobwa in Malawi
