= Cremat =

Alcoholic cocktail of Catalan origin

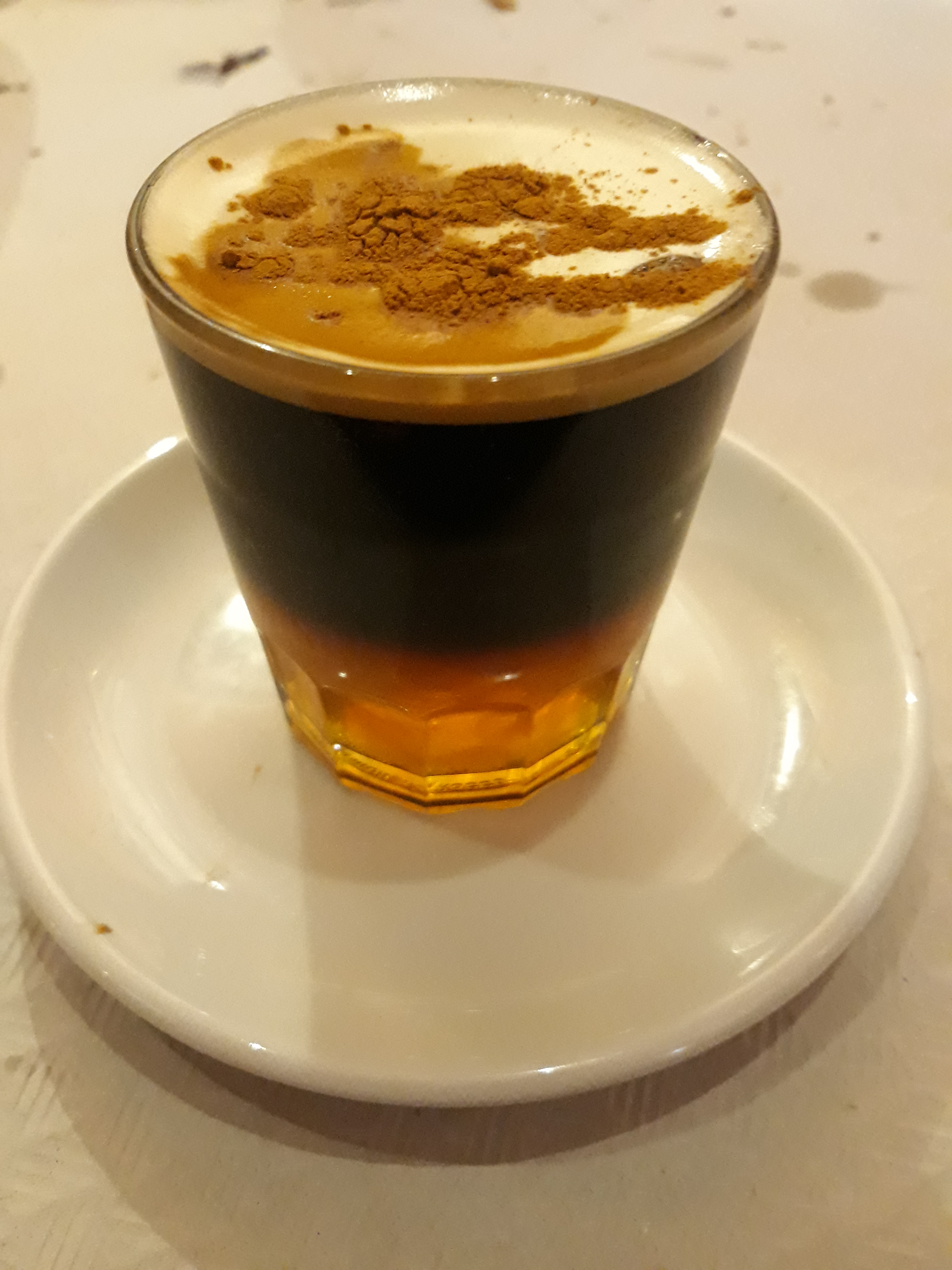
- Cremaet in Borbotó, València.
- Ingredients: dark rum; sugar; lemon peel; cinnamon; coffee beans
- Served: hot
- Preparation: Mix all ingredients in a pot, heat, then set aflame. Put out when about 1/3 of the drink has burned away. Serve hot in coffee mugs or glasses.

Cremat or rom cremat (Catalan pronunciation: [ˈrom kɾəˈmat], Catalan for 'burnt (rum)'), also known as cremaet in Valencia, is an alcoholic cocktail of Catalan origin. Although many different recipes exist, the common elements to most of them are rum, sugar, spices (particularly cinnamon), lemon peel, and some form of coffee (usually roasted beans, but soluble instant coffee or brewed coffee are also used).

== History ==
The origin of the cremat is closely related to historic seatrade between Catalonia and the Americas (particularly Cuba) in the 19th century, at a time when Catalan tradesmen and entrepreneurs set sail for the West Indies in search of fortune (an archetype known in Catalonia as indià or indiano upon their return). The drink is associated with fishermen and believed to have originated on the Costa Brava, the coastal area of Girona.

In the area of Castelló, north of Valencia, a cremat (typically called "cremaet") is a frequent drink to culminate a substantial meal, especially an esmorzaret (heavy breakfast). This custom is similar to that of the carajillo in other regions.

== Popularity and significance ==
Preparation and consumption of cremat constitutes an important part in the ritual of singing havaneres, a musical genre based on Cuban contradanza. This type of sea shanty, and by extension the drink, is a staple of Catalan identity. Since the late 1960s, a concert or cantada of havaneres has become a main event in village festivals (festes majors) around Catalonia, especially but not exclusively on the Costa Brava, and cremat is served to both singers and audiences.

== Preparation ==
Cremat is traditionally brewed in a large terracotta bowl or pot. Dark rum is preferred, although since most of the alcohol is burned away, it is not necessary to use a top shelf brand. The original recipe used sweet cane aguardiente instead of rum.

The rum is mixed with sugar, cinnamon, a lemon peel, and roasted coffee beans, and heated over a stove so that the sugar melts. At this point it can be tasted for sweetness and add sugar if necessary. The following part must be done outdoors: The mixture is set on fire (usually by lighting a spoonful first, and then the whole bowl), and it is left burning until the liquid is reduced to around 2/3 (around 10 minutes). Then it is put out by covering the bowl with a lid, blowing, or throwing brewed coffee on it.

It is then served hot in glasses or coffee mugs.

== See also ==
- List of cocktails
