= Moonshine by country =

This is the list of moonshine by country

== By contaminated moonshine ==
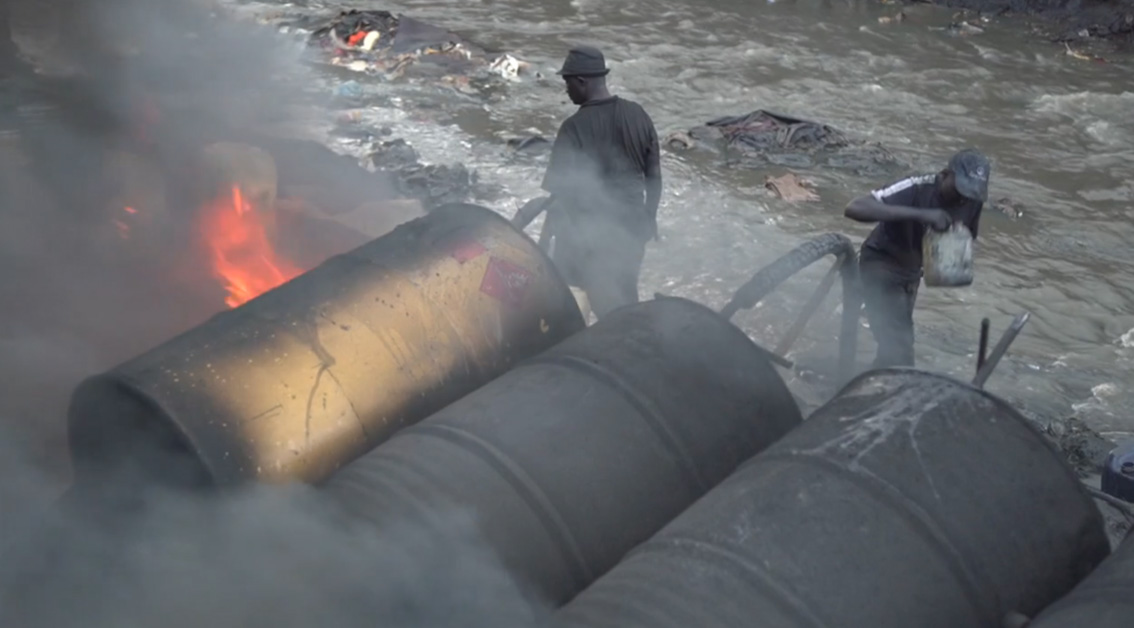
Changaa being made

Moonshine from various countries that have been known to be contaminated:

- Africa
  - Changaa (Kenya)
  - Kumi Kumi (Kenya)
  - Lotoko (Democratic Republic of the Congo)
  - Waragi (Uganda)
- America
  - Guaro (Latin America)
  - Jamaica ginger (United States)
- Asia
  - Desi daru (Indian subcontinent)
    - Desi daru variant: Tharra (Indian subcontinent)
  - Lambanog (Philippines)

== By type ==
This is an alphabetic list of moonshine produced in various countries. Some moonshine types are produced in more than one country. The term bathtub gin refers to any style of homemade spirit made in amateur conditions. Some distilled drinks on the list below are flavored, and some also national liquors.

- Aguardente
- Aguardiente
- Akpeteshie
- Aragh sagi
- Arak
- Araqi
- Arrack
- Bacanora
- Borovička
- Boukha
- Cachaça
- Chacha
- Changaa
- Charanda
- Chicha
- Clairin
- Corn whiskey
- Desi daru
- Tharra
- Génépi
- Grappa
- Guaro
- Hokonui moonshine
- Aragh Sagi
- Jamaica ginger
- Kumi Kumi
- Lambanog
- Lao-Lao
- Lotoko
- Mezcal
- Nocino
- Oghi
- Ogogoro
- Okolehao
- Orujo
- Pálinka
- Palm wine
- Patxaran
- Pisco
- Pitorro
- Poitín
- Pontikka
- Rakia
- Rakı
- Raksi
- Rum
- Schnapps
- Shōchū
- Slivovitz
- Śliwowica łącka
- Soju
- Sotol
- Tequila
- Tsikoudia
- Tsipouro
- Țuică
- Waragi
- Witblits
- Zivania

== By country ==
=== Afghanistan ===
Zarbali is a distilled alcoholic beverage supposedly made from fermented raisins.

=== Albania ===
In Albania, moonshine (Raki) is the primary alcoholic beverage consumed on daily basis. It is made from different fruits, usually grapes, but also plums, apples, blackberries, cornelian cherry, strawberry tree, mulberry, persimmons, figs, juniperus and walnuts.

=== Armenia ===
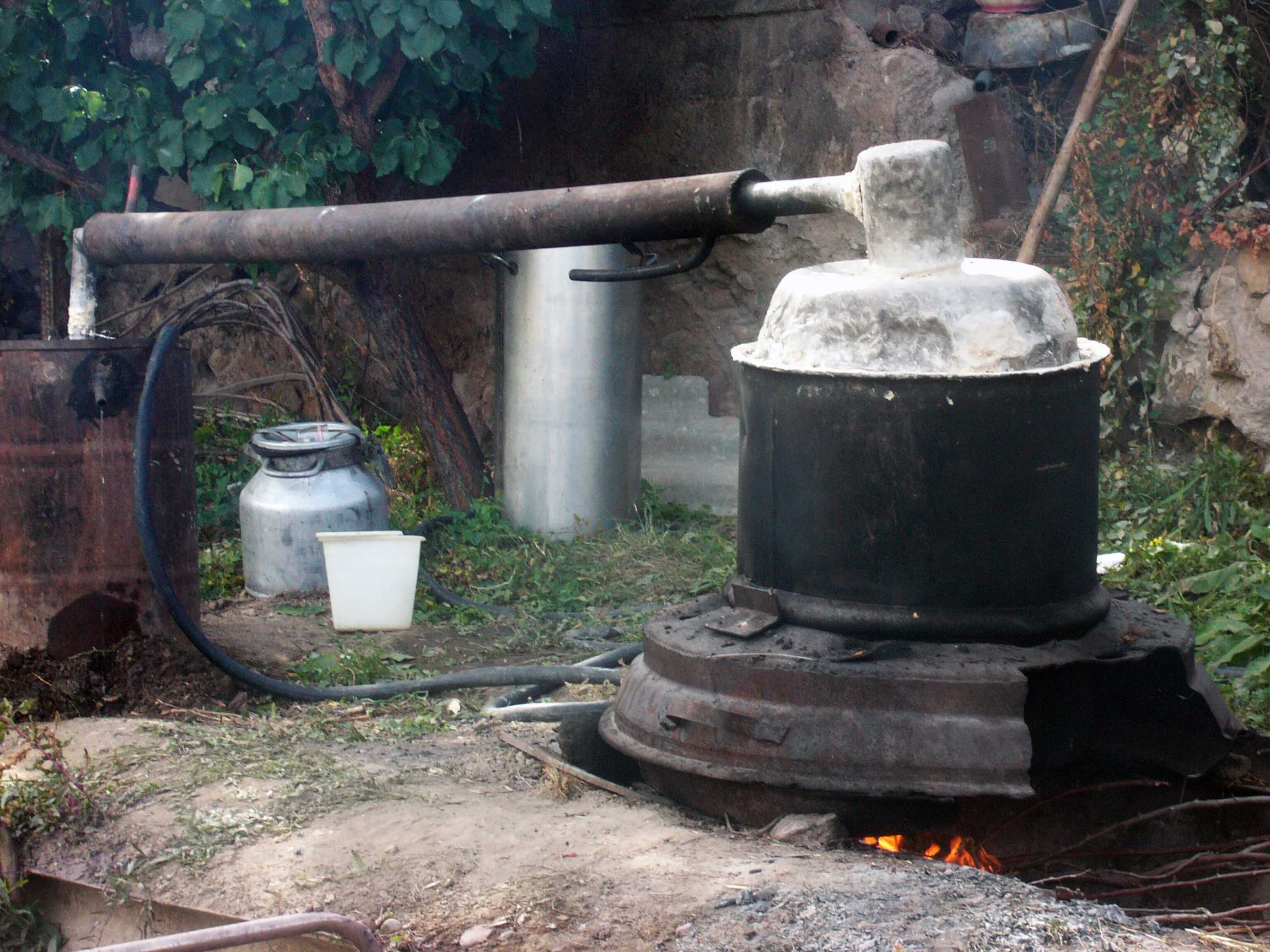
A crude moonshine (aragh) device in an Armenian village

The Armenian name for moonshine is Oghi. The production of oghi is widespread in Armenia. White mulberry, grape, cornelian cherry, plum, and apricot moonshine are especially popular, particularly in the countryside.

=== Australia ===
Distillation of alcohol requires an excise license in Australia. The sale of stills and other distilling equipment, including yeasts, flavourings, and other ingredients specific to distillation, is legal.

=== Benin ===
A typical West African spirit, sodabi is a palm liquor obtained from distilling palm wine. The word sodabi comes from the name of its Beninese inventor, who learned distillation techniques from Europeans in the early twentieth century.

=== Brazil ===
Brazil has a long tradition of home distilling, especially in rural areas. Artisanal liquors (especially cachaça made on small farms) tend to be of good quality and are prized by collectors.

One form that can be qualified as moonshine is known as "Maria Louca" ("Crazy Mary"). This is aguardente, made in jails by inmates. It can be made from many cereals, ranging from beans to rice or whatever can be converted into alcohol, be it fruit peels or candy, using improvised and illegal equipment.

=== Bulgaria ===
The national spirit in Bulgaria is called "rakia" (ракия). It is usually made from grapes, but other fruits are used as well, such as plum (сливова), apricot, apple, pear, raspberry, or peach. Rakia is the most popular drink in Bulgaria along with wine. Like wine, it is often produced by villagers, either in a community owned (public) still, or in simpler devices at home. Homemade rakia is considered of better quality and "safer" than rakia made in factories, since there were, especially during the 1990s, many counterfeit products on sale. By tradition, distilling a certain amount of rakia for home use has been free of taxes.

=== Canada ===
The common names in Canada for home-made alcohol are shine (bagosse in French) or screech (which usually refers to a rum rather than a whiskey) in Newfoundland; in Manitoba, the term home-brew is also common. Two legal products that are marketed as shine or screech are Myriad View Artisan Distillery Strait Shine and Newfoundland Screech.

=== Colombia ===
In Colombia moonshine is called "Tapetusa" or "Chirrinchi" and is illegal. However, it is quite popular in some regions and has been traditional for hundreds of years. The cost of tapetusa is a fraction of the heavily taxed legal alcoholic beverages. The Indigenous peoples used to make their own version of alcoholic drink called "Chicha" before the arrival of Europeans. Chicha is usually made of corn, which is chewed and spat in an earthen container that was then buried for some time (weeks). The latter is a special kind of alcoholic beverage, and similar to that made by Chilean Indians (Mapuches), but in Chile a legal version of Chicha, made of fermented apples, is sold in September. In the Caribbean coast there is a moonshine called "Cococho", an Aguardiente infamous for the number of blindness cases due to the addition of methanol.

On the Caribbean coast of Colombia, the Wayuu tribe produces chirrinche for local consumption and trade with tourists. Chirrinche is very strong, and often produces a severe hangover.

=== Croatia ===
The tradition in Croatia is similar to Bosnia, and it is also called "rakija" and it is made of various fruits. Each fruit has its own quality. Most common fruit for producing "rakija" is plum, because of its high percent of fruit sugar which should be better than industrial sugar, since the final product should contain no methanol. It can also be made from wine and grapes, when it is called "Lozovača". In some parts of Croatia herbs are put into "Lozovača", which they call "Travarica" and it is said that it could heal stomach pains and various diseases. This kind of brandy production is very common in the Croatian culture and was largely unregulated before Croatia's accession to the EU on 1 July 2013, when registration and certain taxes were imposed even on distilling for personal use. However, following the EU directive change (2020/1151 art 22 para 8), in 2021, small scale production for personal use from fruit one grows oneself was exempt from taxation, fully if annual production is up to 50L.

=== Cyprus ===
In Cyprus, a traditional drink is made from distilling grapes known as zivania.

=== Czechia ===
The staple Czech liquor is traditionally made from distilling plums and is known as 'slivovice' (pronounced "slivovitze"), or 'meruňkovice', made from apricots. Traditionally produced in garages and cellars, nowadays it is also produced by specialist distillers. It is found especially in the region of Moravia and is popular at celebrations, including weddings. Czech distillers also offer a service to distill your own fruit mash for you, but they charge heavily on top of taxes. The Czech term for this type of alcohol is "pálenka."

=== Democratic Republic of the Congo ===
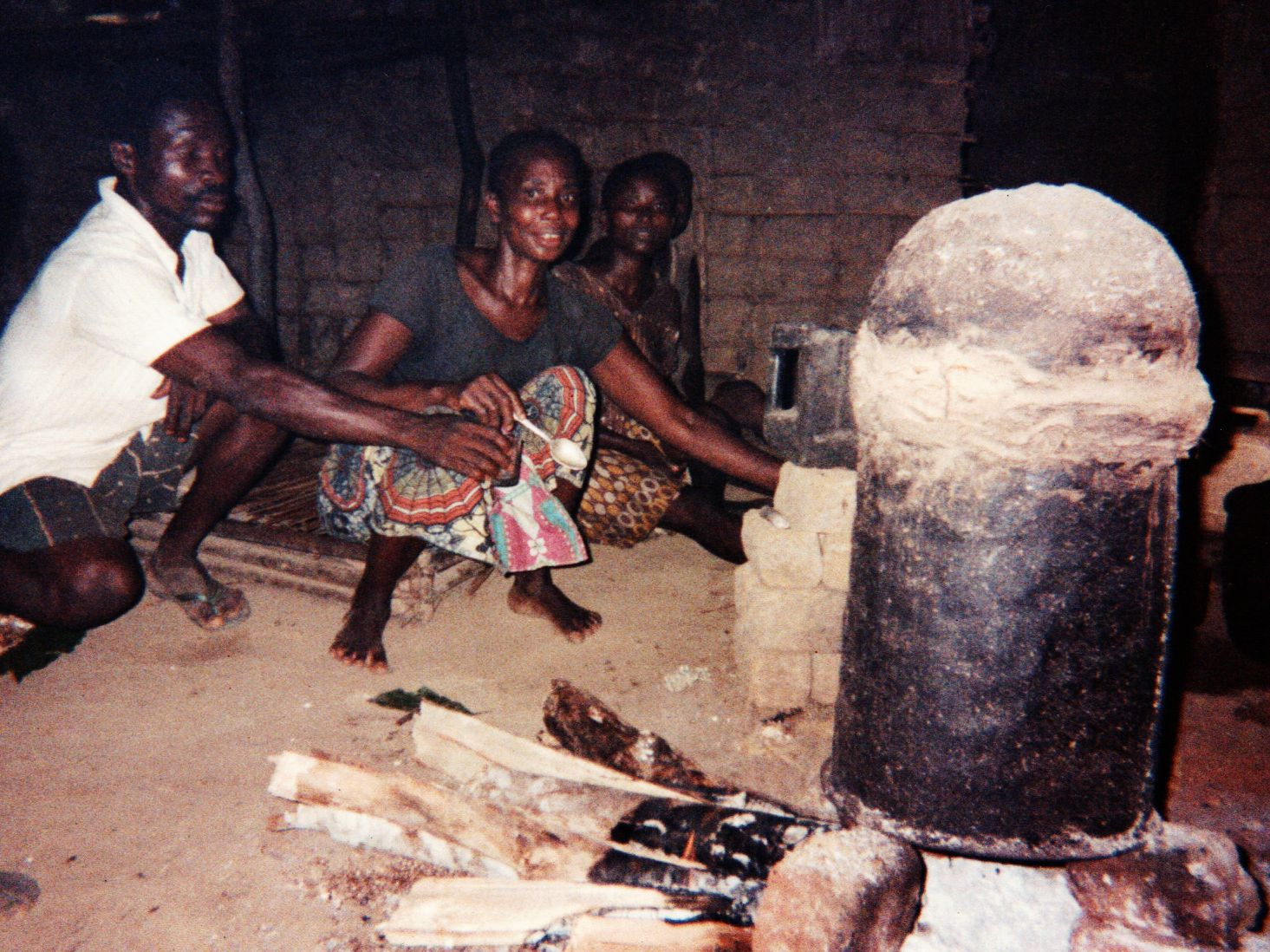
Lotoko being made from maize, in a still improvised from an oil drum. – Democratic Republic of Congo

Home-made corn or cassava-based whiskey is known as lotoko in the DRC.

Lotoko is usually made from maize, but sometimes made from cassava, or plantain. Heads of corn are cut up and boiled into a mash which is then fermented and distilled using improvised stills made from cut-down oil drums. Because of the woody core of the cobs of corn, the alcohol produced contains high levels of methanol which is toxic.

Although it is officially banned, because of its high alcohol content (over 50%), its production is widespread in the Democratic Republic of Congo.

Lotoko made from cassava or plantain lacks the same methanol risk.

=== Denmark ===
In Denmark, moonshine is referred to as hjemmebrændt (lit.: home burnt, that is home distilled). In Denmark an excise license is required to manufacture spirits above 14%. The penalty for illegal manufacture of spirits is a large fine or prison and confiscation of the spirit-making equipment. Even the possession or manufacturing of moonshine equipment is a criminal act. Importing any equipment that can be used for spirit distillation is supposed to be reported to the authorities.

=== Finland ===
Finnish moonshine, pontikka, is home-made vodka, usually made from any fermentable carbohydrates, most commonly grain, sugar or potato, made into kilju and distilled ideally three times (kolmasti kirkastettu). It is said that the name pontikka came about due to the poor quality French wine from Pontacq. Other names are ponu (an abbreviation of pontikka), ponantsa (a pun on Bonanza), kotipolttoinen (home-burnt), tuliliemi (fire sauce), korpiroju (wildwood junk), or korpikuusen kyyneleet (tears of a wildwood spruce) as stills often are located in remote locations. In Finland Swedish, the most common term is moscha, deriving from English "moonshine", as the term was first used by emigrants who had returned home from America. Home distillation was forbidden in 1866, but it was nevertheless widely practiced. Moonshining was boosted by prohibition in Finland in 1919–32, but even though alcohol was legalized, high excise taxes were still levied on it and various restrictions were in place. However, in recent years, the structural change of the rural Finland, the changes in Finnish alcohol politics due to EU membership, the rise of living standards and the availability of cheaper legal liquors, caused by lowering the excise taxes and abolishment of specific import restrictions from Estonia, have made making pontikka a rarity, and it is no longer considered a serious policy issue.

Unlicensed moonshining is technically illegal in Finland, but it is often considered a challenge or hobby. In practice prosecution follows only if the authorities become aware that the product is being sold. Most Finnish moonshiners use simple pot stills and flash distillation. Some have constructed sophisticated reflux or rock stills for fractional distillation, containing plate columns or packed columns, with reflux filling components of Raschig rings, crushed glass, nuts, glass pellets or steel wool. The city of Kitee is the most famous Finnish "moonshine-city". Although by definition illegal, drinks produced by the same process are legally available: a brand of vodka called "Kiteen kirkas" ("Kitee's Clear") is available commercially and Helsinki Distilling Company also produces "sea-buckthorn pontikka".

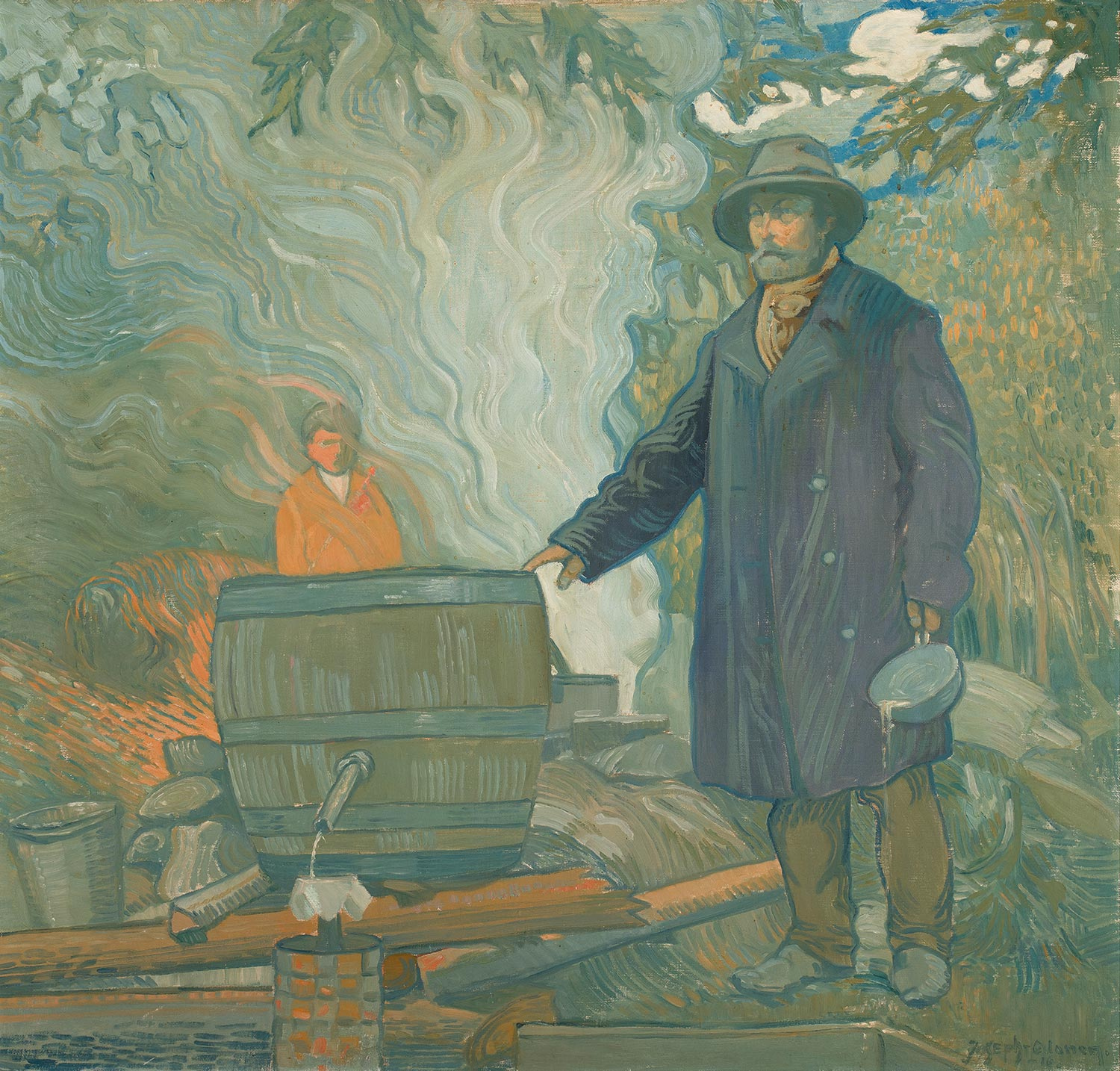
Moonshiner, 1916 painting by Joseph Alanen

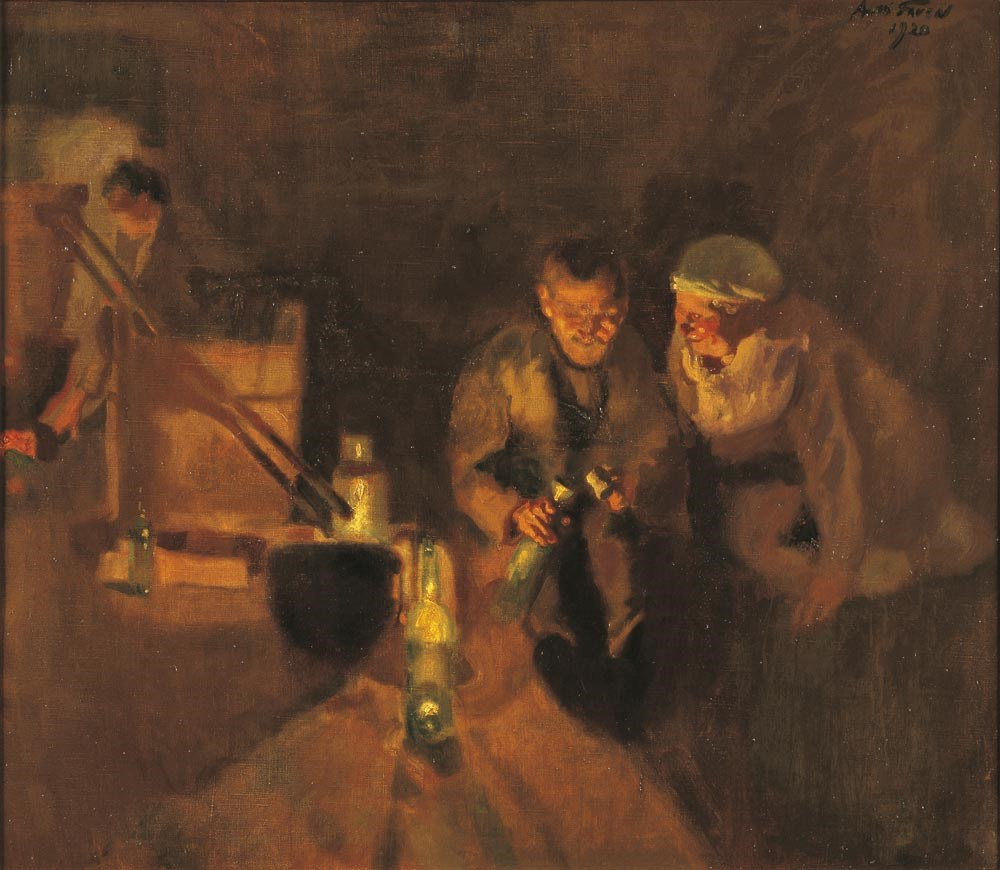
Moonshiners, Antti Favén, 1920

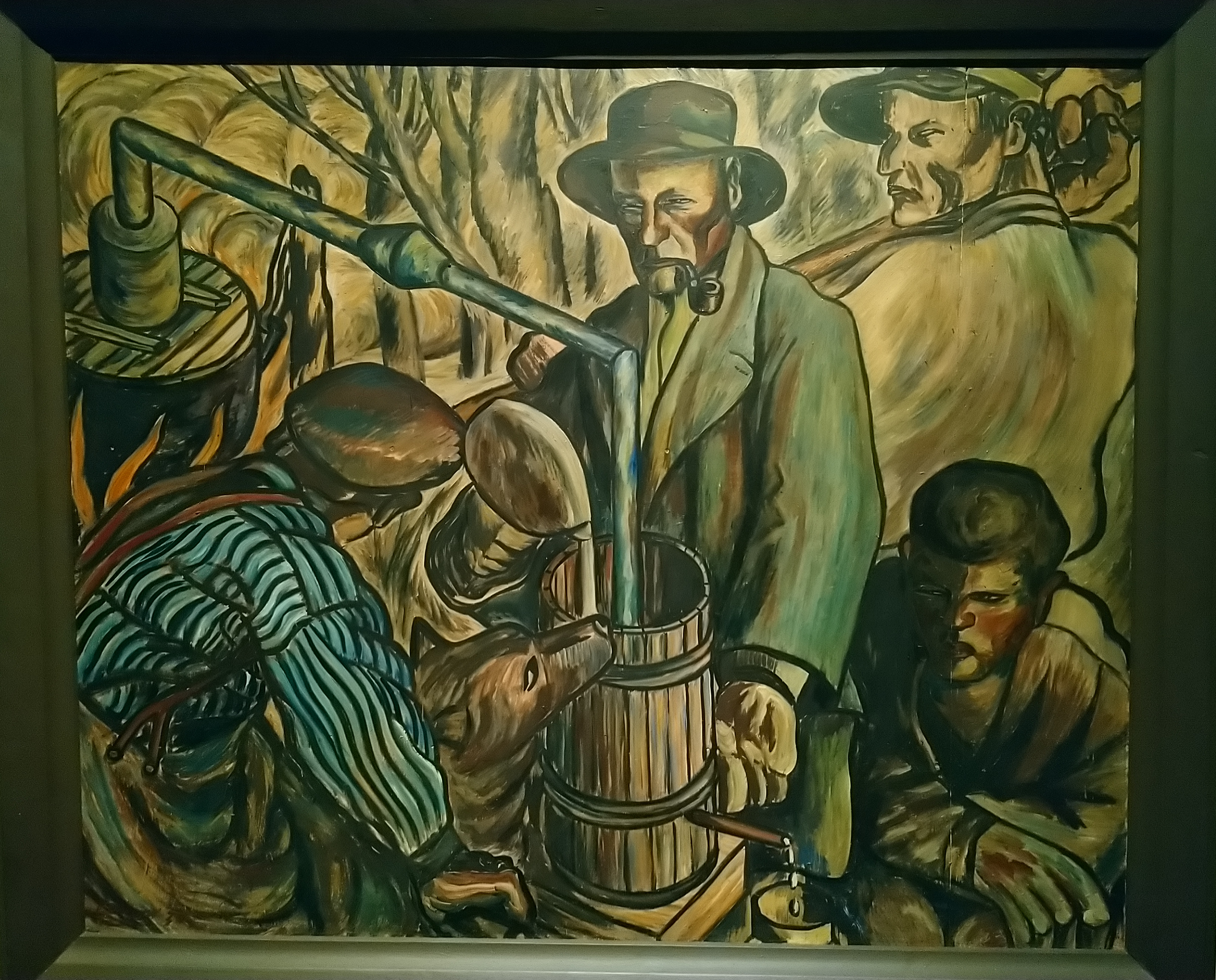
Moonshiners by Vilho Lampi in 1930, with the artist himself in the middle

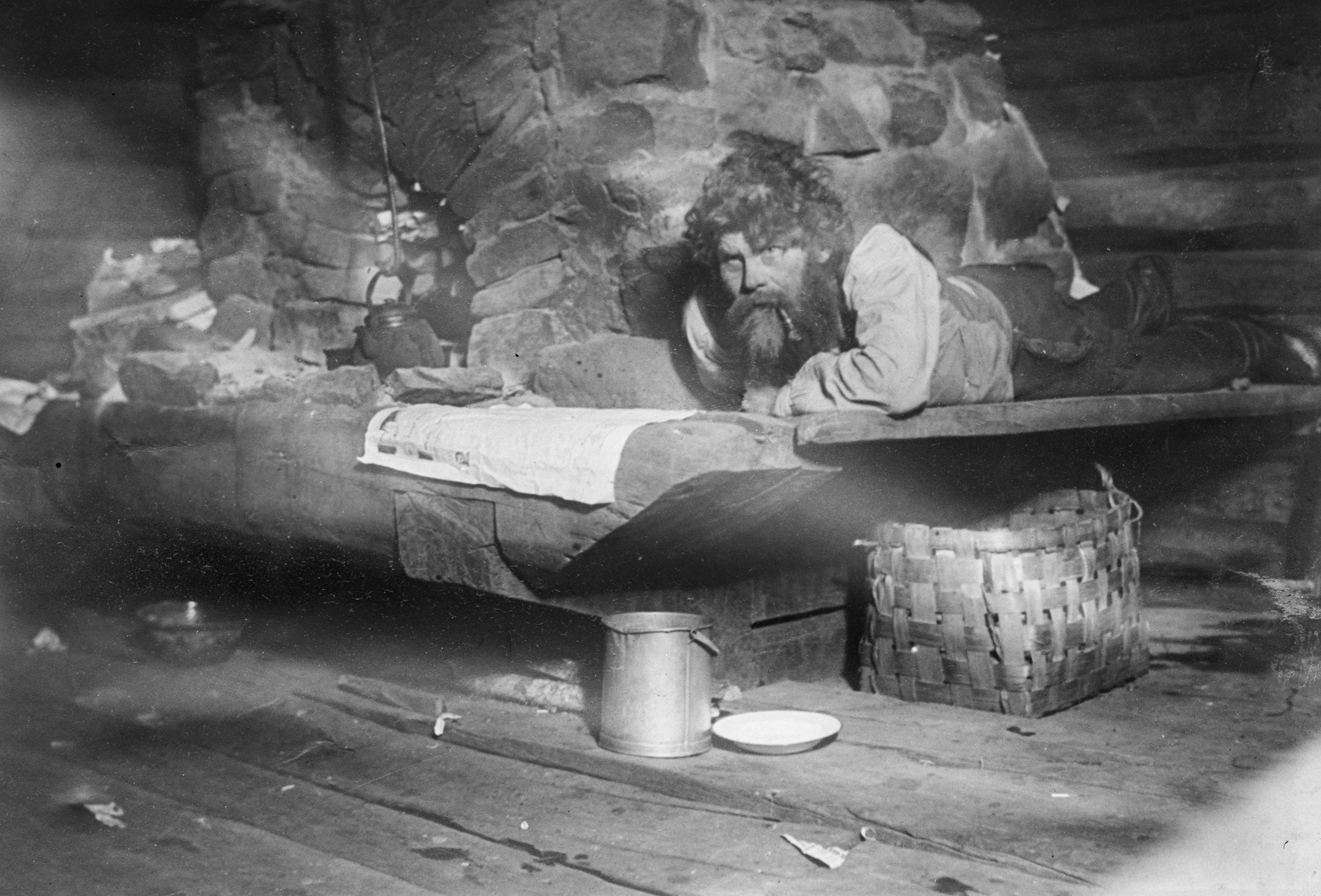
Finnish moonshiner of some fame, Iso Abel "Luntta" Valkonen, 1932

=== France ===
Eau de vie, gnôle, goutte, lambic, fine, or more generically the simple name of the fruit they were distilled from – poire (Pear), prune (Plum), mirabelle (Mirabelle) – there is a wide variety of terms in French to speak of strong alcohols, which also reflects the wide variety of recipes and ingredients available to make them. There are strong local traditions depending on the provinces: lambic or calvados is distilled from cider in Brittany and Normandy, mirabelle, prune, and kirsch are mainly produced in the East (Alsace, Lorraine, Bourgogne, Champagne), and every wine-producing region has, to some extent, a tradition of making brandy, the most famous being Cognac and Armagnac.

Unlicensed moonshining was tolerated in France up to the late 1950s. Since 1959 the right can no longer be transferred to descendants, and only a few bouilleurs de cru are still exercising their right. Owning a registered fruit orchard or a vineyard still gives the right to have the production distilled, but is no longer free, and a licensed distillery must be utilized. The excise amounts to €7.50 per litre of pure alcohol for the first 10 litres, and €14.50 per litre above that limit.

=== Georgia ===
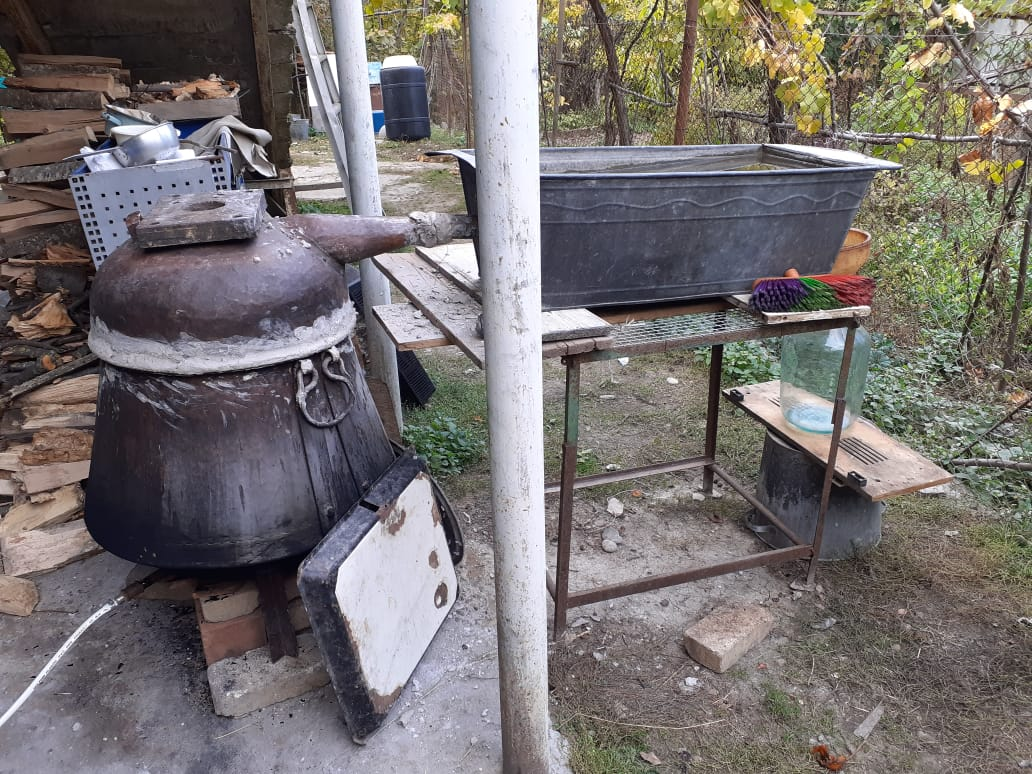
Georgian home distillery

In Georgia the traditional grape moonshine is called chacha. Recently, with modernized distilling and aging technology, chacha is promoted as "Georgian brandy" or "Georgian vodka", and is compared to grappa.

=== Germany ===
In Germany, moonshine is called Schwarzgebrannter. The term is very often translated "black burned" since the word schwarz means black, but in this case schwarz means illegal (as in black market). A more accurate translation is "illegally distilled liquor". Generally, home-distillation of alcohol is illegal in Germany, and even the use of very small stills up to 500 millilitres (18 imp fl oz; 17 US fl oz) capacity is illegal since January 2018. Such stills were only used by hobbyists until that date. Possession of such a still is not illegal, but its use was made illegal in January 2018. The ownership of larger stills must be reported to fiscal authorities, otherwise it is illegal, and the use of these stills requires a licence. The German market for moonshine is limited, in part because legal alcohol is inexpensive, compared to most European countries and in part because controls are generally effective. German home-distilled alcohol is in most cases a type of traditional German Schnapps, often a type of fruit brandy. There are many legal and often very small distilleries in Germany. Most of these small distilleries are located in Southern Germany, located on farms and are home-distilleries. These producers of distilled beverages are called Abfindungsbrennerei and the operation of these small distilleries requires a special type of licence. The number of such licences is limited and it is difficult to obtain one, since in most cases all licences are in use. An Abfindungsbrennerei is only allowed to produce a limited amount of pure alcohol per year and the operation of the still is limited to some months of the year. The tax is calculated by the amount of mash using a standardized sugar content of the type of fruit (for example 5% sugar content for cherries). There are tight controls of these limitations. The products of an Abfindungsbrennerei, though in many cases home-distilled, are not considered Schwarzgebrannter, since they are taxed and legal.

=== Ghana ===
Ghanaian moonshine is referred to as akpeteshie, and is distilled from palm wine, or juice from the sugar cane. It is also at times referred to as apio or simply hot drink.

=== Greece ===
Greek moonshine is known as tsipouro (Greek: τσίπουρο) or raki (Greek: ρακή). In the island of Crete it is also known as raki or tsikoudia (Greek: τσικουδιά). It is usually made from pomace grapes. The best quality of raki is made from grape berries. There is also anise-flavored tsipouro, usually made in Thessaly (Tsipouro Tyrnavou) and also tsipouro made from Greek strawberry tree berries (Greek: κουμαριά), usually made in Southern Albania.

There are legal commercial distilleries, but private stills are quite common, particularly in rural areas. Home distilled products are generally produced in limited quantities, for the distiller's personal use and for gifts to friends and family—many of whom are often present during the distillation process.

=== Haiti ===
In Haiti moonshine is called clairin. It is made from sugar cane juice or syrup, fermented with the wild yeast of the local area and distilled once to proof on a small batch still (discontinuous distillation). There are over 500 small producers or 'guildives' making Clairin for the local consumption of their own village. It is typically consumed straight off the still out of a plastic bottle or jug with no dilution.

=== Hawaii ===
Okolehao is a Hawaiian Alcoholic spirit whose main ingredient was the root of the ti plant. Okolehao's forerunner was a fermented ti root beverage or beer. When distillation techniques were introduced by an escaped English convict in 1790s, it was distilled into a highly alcoholic spirit.

=== Honduras ===
In Honduras, moonshine is commonly called guaro. It is normally distilled from sugarcane. In small towns, it is often sold out of the home by the producer. In cities and larger towns you can find it where other liquors are sold, usually in plastic bottles with labels of local producers.

=== Hungary ===
Hungarian moonshine is called házipálinka (pálinka is a spirit, házi means 'homemade'). It is mostly made in rural areas where the ingredients, usually fruit, are readily available. In modern times, home distillation was illegal (since medieval time, it was a privilege of the nobility), as it constituted a tax fraud if not carried out at a licensed distillery, however it was, and is quite widespread. Since 2010, it is legal to produce small portions (up to 86 liters 42% ABV per year per person) házipálinka for personal use (i.e. to be consumed by "the distiller, their family and guests") for a small, yearly fee. Community distilleries also exist, operated by one or more villages, to make maintaining the equipment profitable (in case of rented distill-time, however, the personal quota is 50 liters).

=== Iceland ===
Icelandic moonshine (Landi) is distilled mash (landabrugg, brjostbirta or gambri). It is largely made by hobbyists due to high liquor taxes, but used to be a prolific business during the prohibition. Due to the lack of natural cover and harsh weather conditions, most "moonshining" activity occurs indoors in a controlled environment. Although potatoes and sugar are the most common constituent of Icelandic moonshine, any carbohydrate can be used, including stale bread. Landi is often consumed by people who cannot buy alcohol, either due to their young age or distance from the nearest alcohol store.

=== India ===
Locally produced moonshine is known in India as tharra. It is made by fermenting the mash of sugar cane pulp in large spherical containers made from waterproof ceramic (terra cotta). In South India, moonshine is any alcoholic drink not made in distilleries. Toddy and arrack are not synonyms or Indian names for moonshine liquor. Toddy (or taddy) is an alcoholic beverage made from the sap of palm trees, and arrack refers to strong spirits made traditionally from fermented fruit juices, and the sap of the palm tree. In the Indian state of Goa, a locally produced cashew flavored drink Feni is popular among locals and the tourists. In Assam it is known as 'Sulai'. Many thousands of people have died consuming moonshine in India, including a number of major incidents with over 100 dead at a time, often – but not exclusively – associated with methanol poisoning of the victims, where highly toxic methanol is used as a cheap way, as compared to the proper use of ethanol, to increase the alcohol content of moonshine.

=== Indonesia ===
Arrack is commonly produced as moonshine, and has resulted in deaths from contaminants. Locally, moonshine alcoholic beverages are known as "oplosan", and it is estimated that illegal alcohol consumption including oplosan may exceed legal alcohol consumption fivefold. Between 2008 and 2017, over 800 died from moonshine poisoning.

=== Iran ===
Arak (especially Aragh sagi) made from various kinds of fruit based liqueurs as well as from wine is commonly produced as moonshine. Its underground production practices have resulted in deaths from contaminants. Also because of the danger of carrying Arak in Iran (as a forbidden drink in Islam) or simply the difficulty of finding it, some use pure ethanol made for chemical uses which increases the chance of alcohol poisoning.

=== Ireland ===
Grain or potato based moonshine made illegally in Ireland is called poitín, or poteen. The term is a diminutive of the word pota ' a pot'. As elsewhere, poteen is the basis for extensive folklore with crafty hillsmen pitted against the "excise men" as in the song The Hackler from Grouse Hall. In the past, the wisp of smoke on an isolated hillside was what gave the poteen-maker away: in modern times this risk was removed by the use of bottled gas to fire the clandestine still.

=== Italy ===
Clandestine distillation of alcohol typically from grapes which is called grappa was common in the once poor north eastern part of Italy, which still produces some of the finest grappa in the country but with tighter control over the supply of distillation equipment its popularity has slumped. However, distillation of grappa still continues in the rural areas of Italy especially in the south where control over distilling equipment is not as rigid. Typically, families produce small quantities for their own consumption and for gifts to others. Nowadays, the supply of production equipment larger than three litres is controlled, and anything smaller must bear a sign stating that moonshine production is illegal.

On the island of Sardinia, one can still find local varieties of abbardenti (a distillate similar to Spanish aguardiente or Italian grappa) which is dubbed 'fil'e ferru', which means 'iron-thread' in the Sardinian language; this peculiar name comes from the fact that jugs and bottles were buried to hide them from authorities with iron-thread tied to them for later retrieval.

=== Kenya ===
Illegally distilled alcohol is widely made in Kenya, known as "Changaa", "Kumi kumi" or "Kill me quick". It is mostly made from maize and produced with crude stills made from old oil drums. The drink has been known to cause blindness and death, possibly as a result of impure distillation, or of unscrupulous adulteration by sellers who aim to enhance the effects of the beverage, such as by adding battery acid. After being illegal in Kenya for many years, the Kenyan government legalised the traditional home-brewed spirit in 2010 in an effort to take business away from establishments adding toxic chemicals to the brew to make it stronger.

=== Laos ===
In Laos (Lao People's Democratic Republic) the home distillation of spirits is technically illegal, although this law is rarely enforced. 'Lao-Lao' is the name given to home-produced liquor, and it is drunk openly especially in rural areas, with many small villages operating a communal still. Usually brewed from rice, it varies from well produced, smooth tasting liquor to very rough spirits with many impurities.

=== Latvia ===
In Latvia, moonshine "kandža" (45–55% vol) is generally made from sugar, sometimes from potatoes or also grains (masing). The brewing kettle commonly is an old aluminum milk-can (approximately 40l). Normally sugar, baker's yeast and water is fermented for few weeks and then distilled with help of gas-burner or wood-cooker. Brewing of "kandža" is illegal; however, in reality as long as it is used for own consumption (not for sale) there are no problems with authorities.

=== Lithuania ===
The Lithuanian name for moonshine is naminė degtinė or in short naminė or naminukė (naminė means 'homemade'); also the word samanė, suggesting the word samanos ('moss'), since usually Lithuanian moonshine was made illegally, e.g. hiding in the woods. Making samanė has deep roots in Lithuanian culture. Records suggest that it has been produced for the last 500 years. Good samanė is made out of rye but other ingredients can be used (Lithuanians sometimes call it liquid bread due to similarities in taste to rye bread). Usually contains 50% to 75% alcohol. Some distillery produced samanė which is made following traditional recipe can be bought legally. Sometimes herbs, leaves or blossom are added and it's kept in oak barrels for at least 5 years.

=== Malta ===
The Maltese word for illegally produced alcohol is lampik. This was produced commonly until the 1960s before strict legal standards were established and enforced. There are several reported cases of alcohol poisoning from the consumption of this type of moonshine, some of which were fatal, including one case on Christmas eve in 1964.

=== Mexico ===
Mexico has a variety of home-made alcohol based on sugar cane or agave. The most common name for sugar-cane based moonshine is 'win' in the central Mexican states or 'charanda' in Michoacan in the west coast. Agave-based distilled beverages are generally named 'mezcal'. However, it can take the names of 'tequila', 'raicilla', or 'bacanora' depending on the region. 'Sotol', a distilled spirit, is made from species of Dasylirion, namely Desert Spoon.

=== Nepal ===
Nepal has an indigenous liquor raksi (Nepali: राक्सी) that is distilled illegally at home as well as legally in rustic distilleries. The legal product is usually made from fruit since there are statutes against diverting grain away from human consumption. Distilled liquor made from grain may also be called daru or double-daru if distilled twice. Legal raksi is seldom aged; usually quite harsh to the taste. Illegal daru may be smoother, or it can be poisonous if improperly prepared. It is not uncommon for Nepalese to tell outsiders that the concoction does not exist.

The Nepalese sometimes add rakshi to hot tea, calling the mixture 'Jungle Tea'.

=== New Zealand ===
New Zealand is one of the few western societies where home distillation is legal for personal consumption but not for private sale. In New Zealand, stills and instruction in their use are sold openly. Hokonui moonshine was produced in Southland by early settlers whose (then) illegal distilling activities gained legendary status; see Hokonui Hills. Hokonui Moonshine is now produced legally and commercially by the Southern Distilling Company which has recently started to export it.

=== Nigeria ===
In Nigeria, home based brewing is illegal. Moonshine is variously called 'ogogoro', 'kai-kai', 'kainkain', 'Abua first eleven', 'agbagba', 'akpeteshi', 'aka mere', 'push me, I push you', 'koo koo juice', 'crazy man in the bottle', or 'Sapele water' (particularly in Delta State), depending on locality. Several companies produce moonshine legally as 'Gin' examples include Orijin, Schnapps, Chelsea Dry Gin etc. Following the addition of other herbal substances the product may be referred to as "man powa".

=== Norway ===
Due to the very high taxation of alcohol, moonshine production—primarily from potatoes and sugar—remains a popular, albeit illegal, activity in most parts of the country. Moonshining occurs in the Mid- and North-Norwegian regions in particular and rural areas in general. Norwegian moonshine is called "hjemmebrent" or "heimebrent" (which translates into English as "home-burnt"), sometimes also "heimkok"/"himkok" (meaning "home-cooked") or "heimert"/"himert" (slang), "blank vara" or "blank fløte" (meaning "clear stuff" or "clear cream") and the mash is called "sats". In rural parts of eastern Norway, it is also referred to as "ni-seks"(meaning "nine-six", referring to the alcohol content, 96% ABV) as a common moonshine variant is rectified spirits from potatoes. In the county of Telemark mash is also referred to as "bæs". A more contemporary name is "sputnik" after the Soviet satellites, a joke that the liquor's strength could send one into orbit. In the old days on Finnskogen they called the mash Skogens vin ("Wine of the forest"), a name used by poorer people without access to distilling equipment. When talking to foreigners, some Norwegians use the term "something local" about their moonshine. In Norway, moonshine is commonly mixed with coffee, and sometimes a spoon of sugar. This drink is known as karsk, and has a special tie to the mid- and north-Norwegian regions, but is also enjoyed elsewhere. A common joke is that the traditional mixture was made by brewing the strongest, blackest coffee possible, then putting a 5 Øre piece (a copper coin of size and color of a pre-decimalization English penny, no longer in circulation) in a cup. Add coffee to the cup until the coin can no longer be seen, then add hjemmebrent, straight from the still until the coin can again be seen. Apple juice is also a common beverage for mixing, as it is said to "kill the taste" of bad moonshine.

While brewing is permitted in Norway, distillation is not. Possession of equipment capable of distilling is also illegal.

=== Pakistan ===
Despite alcohol being strictly licensed or otherwise illegal in Pakistan, unregulated production in rural areas thrives. Products include tharra and its variants including what is ironically known as "Hunza water" and rudimentary beers made from barley, rye and other grain mixtures.

=== Panama ===
In the faraway rural areas of Panama, the illegal beverage is known as "chirrisco" or "chicha fuerte", and is highly persecuted by the law, as it is a public health concern. It is often made out of any kind of fruit but is especially brewed from rice or corn. Unscrupulous or ignorant distillers often add car battery acid or toxic chemicals to increase potency, thereby leading to poisoning and severe health problems. In fact, discarded herbicide containers are used to store chirrisco.

Sweet cane liquor also is very famous and highly against the law, mainly made and consumed on Azuero's peninsula area, it is known as "guarapo". It is fermented buried into the ground for around a year then distilled up to 3 times. This is a tradition well known by a few Spanish descendant from the peninsula passed down from generations.

=== Peru ===
While pisco, a type of grape brandy, is the country's national liquor, it is rarely homemade. Peruvians for millennia have drunk a type of corn-based beer called chicha, with generally low alcohol content, often homemade in the highlands with some regional variations.

=== Philippines ===
Lambanog is distilled from the sap either of the coconut flower or of the nipa palm fruit. Commercial versions—usually 80 to 90 proof—are widely available, but homemade lambanog can be found in the coconut-producing regions of the country.

=== Poland ===
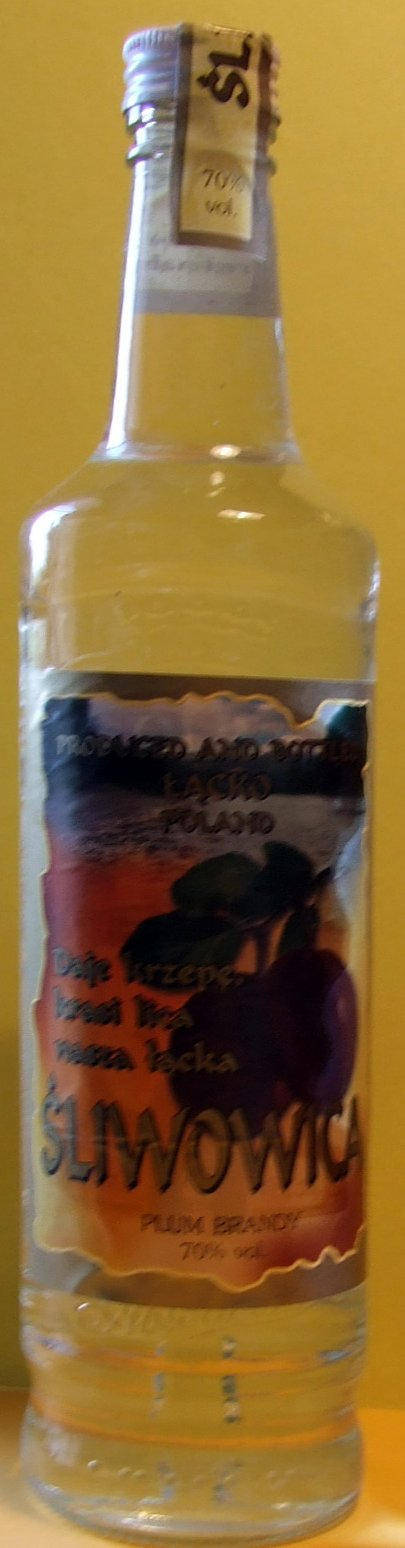
Bottle of Łącka Śliwowica

The Polish name for moonshine is bimber; although the word samogon is also used. Far less common is the word księżycówka, which is roughly equivalent to "moonshine", being a nominal derivation from the word księżyc, "moon". The tradition of producing moonshine might be traced back to the Middle Ages when tavern owners manufactured vodka for local sale from grain and fruit. Later, other means were adopted, particularly those based on fermentation of sugar by yeast. Some of the moonshine is also made from distilling plums and is known under the name of śliwowica. The plum moonshine made in area of Łącko (Southern Poland) called Łącka Śliwowica gained nationwide fame, with tourists travelling to buy this strong liquor. Because of the climate and density of the population, most of the activity occurred indoors.

In Poland, the simplest recipe for producing moonshine by fermentation of yeast with the use of 1 kilogram of sugar, 4 liters of water, and 10 dag (= 100 g) of yeast is jokingly abbreviated as 1410 – the year of the Battle of Grunwald, the most famous victory of the Kingdom of Poland, the Grand Duchy of Lithuania and their allies over the Knights of the Teutonic Order in the Middle Ages.

It is illegal to manufacture moonshine in Poland, as confirmed by the Supreme Court's ruling of 30 November 2004. Selling home-made alcohol is also a tax offence as there is an excise imposed on sale of alcohol, and there is no provision for those manufacturing alcohol illegally to pay this duty if they want to. In reality the law is not consistently enforced, an example being the authorities' toleration of the large-scale manufacture and sale of Śliwowica Łącka. The small sets for home distillation can also be easily purchased in any chemical glass shop with no control whatsoever.

=== Portugal ===
In Portugal the most common type of moonshine is a marc commonly named "[aguardente de] bagaço" or "[aguardente] bagaceira". The word refers to bagasse, the mash of grape skins and stems left over from the production of wine, which is distilled to produce this spirit that bears the same name. When aged in oak casks, it acquires an orange color, like a pale whisky, and enhanced flavour. This is called "bagaceira velha". In the Algarve, Arbutus unedo is endemic, and its fruit ferments on its own while still on the tree. A drink is distilled from it called "[aguardente de] medronho". In Madeira Island they use sugar cane, mashed and distilled, calling their rum as "aguardente de cana". This "Fiery Water" is the main ingredient of the local popular drink, Poncha.

=== Puerto Rico ===
The common Puerto Rican term for moonshine rum is pitorro, from the Andalusian term "pintorro", given to a white wine (or rum, near the rum-producing sugar cane fields of Málaga) of inferior quality which has some grape (in the case of the wine) or molasses (in the case of rum) coloring in it.

=== Romania ===
In Romania, plum brandy is called țuică (tzuika), rachiu (raki) or palincă (palinka), depending on the region in which it is produced. It is prepared by many people in rural areas, using traditional methods, both for private consumption and for sale. Home distillation is legal up to 50 litres per year (13 US gal/a) per household; the excise tax is half of the standard rate. Production is subject to government inspection, for purposes of levying the alcohol tax; undeclared distilleries, even for personal use, are considered tax evasion. Some țuică is sold in markets or fairs and even in supermarkets.

In 2015, an estimated 25,000 hectolitres (660,000 US gal; 550,000 imp gal) were distilled illegally.

=== Russia ===
The Russian name for any homemade distilled alcoholic beverage is samogon (ru: самогон), meaning "self-distilled", literally "self-run". Historically, it was made from malted grain (and therefore similar to whisky), but this method is relatively rare nowadays, due to increased availability of more convenient base ingredients, such as sugar, which modern samogon is most often made from. Other common ingredients include beets, potatoes, bread, or various fruit. Samogon of initial distillation is called pervach (ru: первач), literally translated as "the first one" – it is known for its high quality (pure alcohol evaporates at the beginning of the process, but impurities do not; over time impurities evaporate as well, thus making the rest of the batch not as clean). The production of samogon is widespread in Russia. Its sale is subject to licensing. Unauthorised sale of samogon is prohibited, however, production for personal consumption has been legal since 1997 in most of the country. Samogon often has a strong repulsive odor, but due to cheap and fast production, and the ability to personalize the flavor of the drink, it is relatively popular. Pervach is known for having little to no smell.

Samogon is one of the most popular alcoholic beverages in the country. It directly competes with vodka, which is more expensive (in part due to taxes on distilled alcohol), but contains fewer impurities. A 2002 study found that, among rural households in central Russia, samogon was the most common alcoholic beverage, its per capita consumption exceeding the consumption of vodka 4.8 to 1. The study estimated that, at the time, it was 4 to 5 times cheaper to manufacture homemade samogon from sugar than to buy an equivalent quantity of vodka. Since then, the price of vodka has been rising above the rate of inflation. As of 2011, typical cost of production of homemade samogon is on the order of 30 rubles (approx. US$1) per liter, mainly determined by the price of sugar. The breakeven cost of "economy-class" vodka is 100 rubles/liter, but federal taxes raise retail prices almost threefold, to 280 rubles/liter. Possibly due to rising taxes, per capita consumption of vodka in Russia has been falling since 2004. It has been largely replaced with samogon among marginal classes. Some analysts forecasted that the trend will result in increased adoption of samogon among the middle class, and by 2014, samogon would overtake vodka as the most common alcoholic beverage nationwide.

In 2016, it was estimated that the black market share in hard liquor sales in Russia dropped to 50 percent in 2016 from 65 percent in 2015 and sells for about a third of the vodka sold in shops.

=== Saudi Arabia ===
In Saudi Arabia, where alcohol is prohibited, black-market alcohol, typically distilled from fermented sugar water, is mostly known as "Aragh" (عرق in Arabic). 'Sidiki' or 'sid' are also commonly recognized terms. 'Sid' is often produced by fermenting fruit juice and sugar, after distillation it is commonly cut 2–3 parts water : 1 part 'Sid'. American soldiers, in the American military bases, and South Korean workers in Saudi Arabia create improvised moonshines from water, fruits (lemons and oranges), and yeast.

=== Scotland ===
Illicitly produced whisky from Scotland is called peatreek. The term refers to the smoke (or reek) infused in the drink by drying the malted barley over a peat fire. "Peat Reek" is also the brand name of a legal, commercially available whisky.

Production of spirits in Scotland requires the relevant excise licences, as in the rest of the UK.

=== Serbia ===
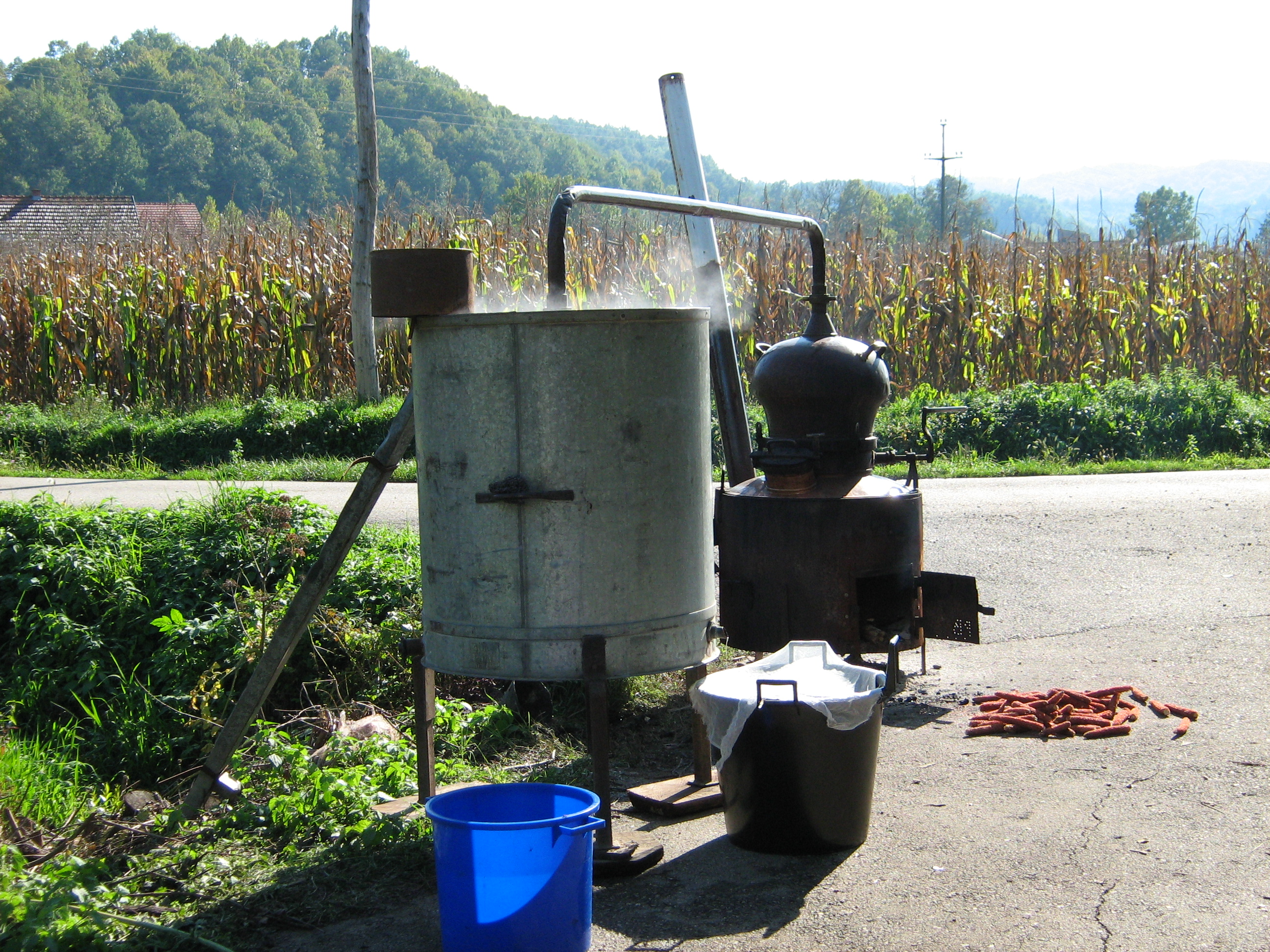
Moonshine distillery in Serbia

In Serbia, home distillation of plum rakia/šljivovica is common (plum = šljiva). Serbians have a long tradition of making plum rakia and it is often made by individuals, with some brands exceeding 60% of alcohol.

Many types of moonshine are produced in Serbia, even though they are almost exclusively fruit-based, made in pot-stills and commonly referred to as rakija. Šljivovica (plum brandy) is the most popular, but brandies based on other fruits, such as breskovača (peach brandy), kajsijevača or kajsijara (apricot brandy), viljamovka (pear brandy), jabukovača (apple brandy) and dunjevača (quince brandy). Product quality can range from poorly produced low ABV type nicknamed brlja (meaning "a screw up", "a mess up" or a "blunder maker") to oak barrel aged fine quality rakija that is superior to the bulk of the commercial market. Rakija is readily available on open markets even in the big cities, so finding a producer of quality product is the only real challenge in the process. There has been a scarcity of reports on poisoning, which indicates a high level of product safety derived from a long tradition. While most of it is produced in the farming regions (central and north), moonshine is being produced throughout the country and one would be hard-pressed to find a village without at least one pot still. Rakija is not commonly used for mixing with any other drinks as it is considered a fine beverage on its own, but some people have been known to drink beton (literally translated as concrete), which is a shot-glass of low quality šljivovica dropped into a glass of beer.

Due to prevailing consumerism, rakija had the image of a low-class category of drinks, not comparable to foreign imports, such as whiskey or rum. A recent upsurge due to purging of the poor producers and standardisation reintroduced rakija as a connoisseur's drink.

=== Slovakia ===
The common term referring to moonshine in Slovakia is domáca, meaning "made at home" / "homebrew"; or pálenô / pálenka / pálené, which roughly translates as "burned", derived from the process of burning during distillation.

A common moonshine in Slovakia is slivovica, sometimes called plum brandy in English. It is notorious for its strong but enjoyable smell delivered by plums from which it is distilled. The typical amount of alcohol is 52% (it may vary between 40 and 60%). The homemade slivovica is highly esteemed. It is considered a finer quality spirit compared to the industrial products which are usually weaker (around 40%). Nowadays this difference in quality is the primary reason for its production, rather than just the economic issues. A bottle of a good homemade slivovica can be a precious gift, since it cannot be bought. The only way to obtain it is by having parents or friends in rural areas who make it. Slivovica is sometimes used also as a popular medicine to cure the early stages of cold and other minor aches. Small-scale home production from own fruit, not dedicated for sale, and made in a licensed and registered pot still is legal. Several other fruits are used to produce similar homemade spirits, namely pears – hruškovica and wild cherries – čerešňovica.

Another common traditional Slovak moonshine is called Borovička, and is flavoured by juniper berries or pine. Its flavor, although much stronger, resembles gin and can a reach 50–70% alcohol content.

=== Slovenia ===
In Slovenia, especially in the western part, moonshine is distilled from fermented grapes remaining from wine production, and sugar if necessary. It is called tropinovec (tropine, means squeezed half-dried grapes, in the west of the country). Šnops (šnopc) or Žganje, as its otherwise known, is generally distilled from pears, plums and apples. Žganje from William pears is named viljamovka and is held in high regard. Because žganje is around 60–70% alcohol, it is often mixed with boiled water to make it lighter (vol. 50%). Tropinovec is rarely drunk in large quantities. Both tropinovec and žganje are often mixed with fruits (blueberries, cherries, pears, etc.) or herbs (Anise, Wolf's bane, etc.), either to improve the flavor or for alternative medical treatment. Žganje mixed with blueberries (named Borovničke) is especially popular. In the Karst region Brinjevec is made by distilling juniper berries, and is used mostly for medicinal purposes. Cheaper, drinking version, similar to Borovička (juniper flavoured žganje) is made in other places (and also sold commercially) under the same name. Home distilling is legal in Slovenia. Still owners are obliged to register and pay excise duties (approximately US$15 for 40–100 L stills and US$30 for stills larger than 100 L). There were 20,539 registered home distillers in 2005, down from over 28,000 in 2000.

=== Solomon Islands ===
In the Solomon Islands illegal liquor known as Kwaso is distilled and widely consumed. It is often of low quality and is thought to have caused death, blindness and severe health problems.

=== South Africa ===
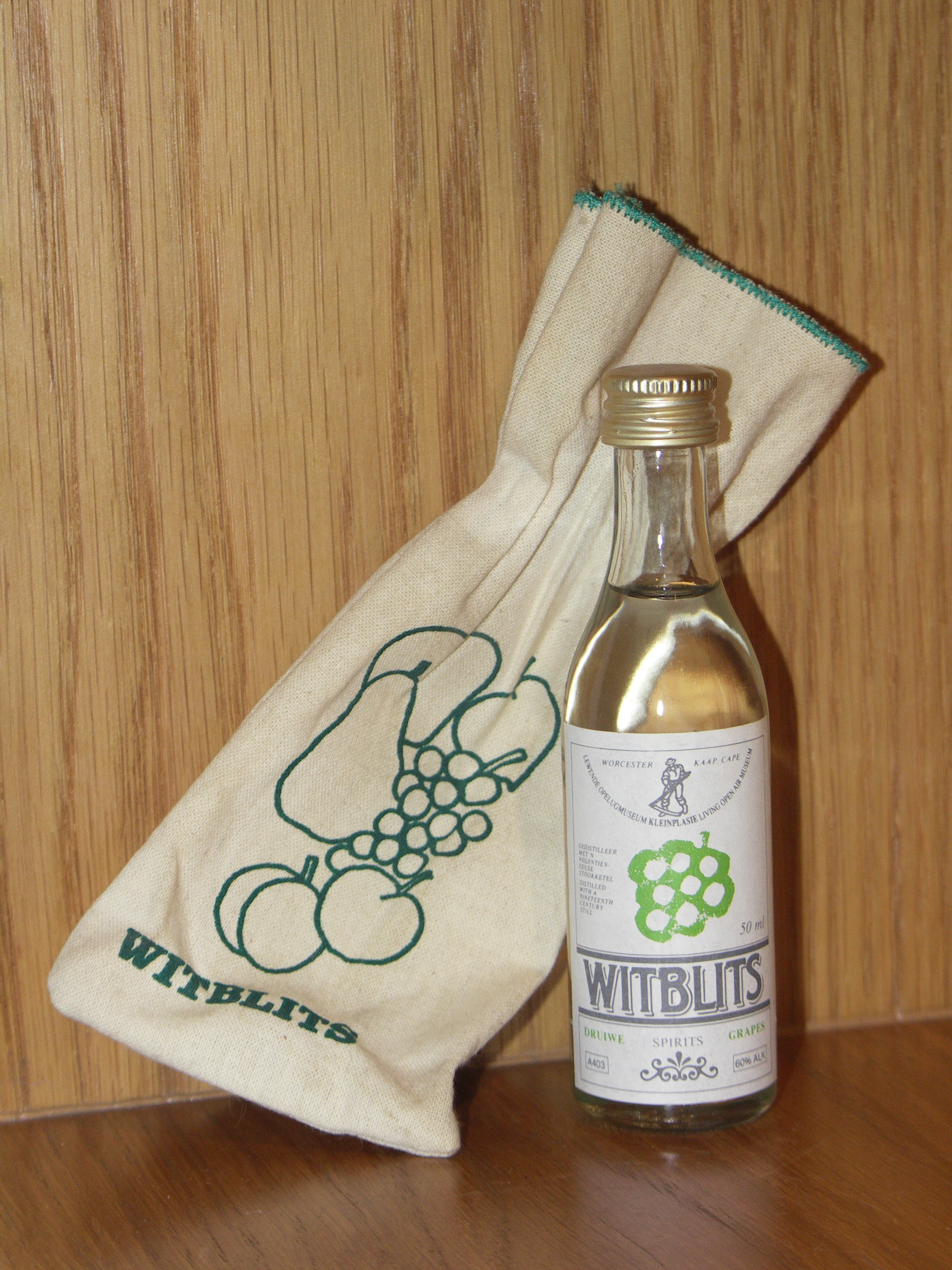
A small bottle of witblits

In South Africa moonshine made from fruit (mostly peaches or marulas) is known as mampoer (named after the Pedi chief Mampuru). The equivalent product made from grapes is called witblits (white lightning). Witblits has a long history in the Western Cape Province (over 200 years) and many producers take pride in their product, which is widely available from liquor stores and at farmer's markets. Most witblits is of a very high quality compared to typical moonshine worldwide and is generally comparable to grappa. A licence is required to distill alcohol in South Africa. A limited number of "cultural heritage" small-scale distillers are licensed.

=== Spain ===
Most of the moonshine in Spain is made as a byproduct of wine making by distilling the squeezed skins of the grapes. The basic product is called orujo or aguardiente (burning water). The homemade versions are usually stronger and have a higher alcoholic content, well over the 40% that the commercial versions typically have. Starting with orujo there are a countless number of blends and flavours around. Typically adding herbs, spices or berries or fruits or mixing the moonshine with other distillates. The best-known are probably: pacharán, licor café and orujo de hierbas.

=== Sri Lanka ===
In Sri Lanka, home based brewing is illegal. However, this is a lucrative underground business in most parts of the island. Illicit brew is known by many names; 'Kasippu' is the most common and accepted name, 'Heli Arrakku' (archaic term means, Pot-Liquor), 'Kashiya' (which is a pet name derived from more mainstream term Kasippu), 'Vell Beer' (means, beer of the paddy field), 'Katukambi' (means, barbed wire), 'Suduwa' (means, the white substance), 'Galbamuna' (a crude name), 'Gahapan Machan' (means drink it, mate), vell fanta depending on locality. The raw materials used in the production are mainly common white sugar (from Sugarcane) or local fruits for special brew kasippu manufactured in Sri Lanka, yeast, and urea as a nitrogen source.

=== Sudan ===
In Sudan, all domestically produced distilled alcoholic beverages can be considered moonshine, on account of a general prohibition of alcohol pursuant to the demands of Islamists for the establishment of Sharia. Nevertheless, production remains widespread, particularly in rural areas of the country, predominantly in the form of araqi, produced from dates.

=== Sweden ===
In Sweden, moonshine is known as hembränt (HB) (literally "home-burnt", not to be confused with homebrewing), and has various humorous nicknames like skogsstjärnan (English: forest star, the Swedish name for arctic starflower), Chateau de Garage, folksprit (English: booze of the people) and norrlandschampange (English: Norrland Champagne).

As the desired product is a neutral spirit (resembling vodka), the "mash" is typically a mix of sugar and yeast in water which gets a simple distillation followed by filtration in activated charcoal after being diluted to 30%–50% ABV as higher strengths lessens the efficiency of the filtering. Sometimes, freeze distillation is used to make applejack or other drinks with lower alcohol content.

Unlicensed manufacture, transfer and possession of distilled alcohol is illegal in Sweden, as is the manufacture, transfer and possession of stills or parts of stills intended for unlicensed manufacture of alcohol. The manufacture, transfer and possession of mash intended for this purpose is also illegal. However, moonshine is most socially accepted in rural areas, where it is produced for own consumption rather than for sale, but due to relaxed import regulation since 2005, business has declined.

=== Switzerland ===
In Switzerland, absinthe was banned in 1910, but underground distillation continued throughout the 20th century. The Swiss constitutional ban on absinthe was repealed in 2000 during a general overhaul of the national constitution, but the prohibition was written into ordinary law instead. Later that law was also repealed, so from 1 March 2005, absinthe is again legal in its country of origin, after nearly a century of prohibition. Absinthe is now not only sold in Switzerland, but is once again distilled in its Val-de-Travers birthplace, with Kübler and La Clandestine Absinthe among the first new brands to emerge, albeit with an underground heritage. The alcohol contents variation of those legal absinthes in their first few years is interesting to note. Whereas pre-2005 bootleg absinthe usually clocked in at 65–70% alcohol by volume (ABV), the first few legal absinthes were aligned on the 42–45% ABV of other common domestic spirits such as fruit schnapps. This proved lacking in taste intensity for a drink that is drunk watered down as a rule, and by 2010 most Swiss absinthes contained something on the lines of 54% ABV, a few being back to the pre-2005 strength that is 65%, sometimes up to 72% ABV.

=== Thailand ===
In Thailand, home-brewed alcohol, traditionally distilled from rice, but now most commonly distilled from Molasses due to lower production costs, is called lao khao (เหล้าขาว; literally "white liquor") or officially sura khao (สุราขาว). It is sometimes mixed with various herbs to produce a medicinal drink called ya dong (ยาดอง; literally "fermented herb (in alcohol)").

Ya dong is prepared by mixing lao khao with various herbs and allowing the mixture to ferment for 2–4 weeks before use. Some people claim that it helps them regain strength. These days you can find instant yadong mixes that significantly reduce the time it takes to produce the final product.

=== Tunisia ===
Boukha is a spirit produced from figs in Tunisia. Its name means 'alcohol vapor' in Tunisian Judeo-Arabic dialect. It is obtained by simple distillation of Mediterranean figs from Tunisia. Its alcohol percentage ranges between 36 and 40 percent.

Boukha is consumed dry, room temperature or cold. It can also serve as the basis for many cocktails, flavors and fruit salad or drunk with a meal at room temperature.

=== Turkey ===
Turkish moonshine is called Raki. Sometimes it is flavored with anise. The name however does not imply illegal distilling, as there are legal distilleries that produce raki too. Real "moonshine" from clandestine sources that is homemade from grapes, figs, berries or sour cherries is popular in the south, and called "boğma". A very distinctive source of 100% pure Turkish moonshine made by locals of Arabic descent is the district of Samandağ in Hatay Province, close to Syria. Boğma is also made by and very popular among the Arab population in the city of Adana, especially the suburb of Güneşli.

=== Uganda ===
Waragi is a moonshine gin produced from bananas and often stored in jerrycans. In moonshine form, it is drunk mostly by people who cannot afford commercially available alcohol, although there are several brands that use the term "waragi" in their names. In April 2010, more than 80 people were poisoned in the Kampala district after consuming waragi laced with methanol.

In addition to waragi, which is popular in the Central region, other moonshine gins include Lira-lira, which, according to research reports, contains between 100 and 6000% copper above the US Environmental Protection Agency (EPA) limit.

=== United States ===
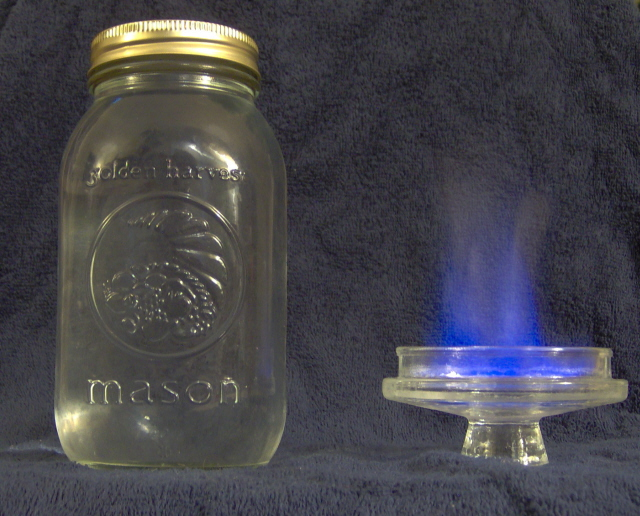
A typical jar of moonshine. It was once wrongly believed that the blue flame meant that it was safe to drink.

While home distillation is illegal in the United States, it continues to be practiced, mainly in Appalachia. The product is sometimes called white lightning, because it is not aged and is generally sold at high alcohol proof, often bottled in Mason jars. A typical moonshine still may produce 1000 gallons per week and net $6000 per week for its owner. The simplicity of the process, and the easy availability of key ingredients such as corn and sugar, make enforcement difficult. However, the price advantage that moonshine once held over its legally sold competition has fallen. Nevertheless, over half the retail price of a bottle of distilled spirits typically consists of taxes. With the availability of cheap refined white sugar, moonshiners can make saleable product for a fraction of the price of heavily taxed and legally sold distilled spirits. Some people also use moonshine alcohol for herbal tinctures.

The number of jurisdictions that ban alcoholic beverage sales has steadily decreased, which means many of former moonshine consumers are much nearer to a legal alcohol sales outlet than before. Many legal distilled beverages, usually neutral spirits or corn whiskey, with names evoking moonshine exist, such as Onyx Moonshine, Virginia Lightning, Georgia Moon Corn Whiskey, Ole Smoky Tennessee Moonshine, and Junior Johnson's Midnight Moon are produced commercially and sold in liquor stores, typically packaged in a clay jug or glass Mason jar. While these products may refer to themselves as "moonshine," any alcohol that is legally sold cannot be accurately called "moonshine" by nature of the term.

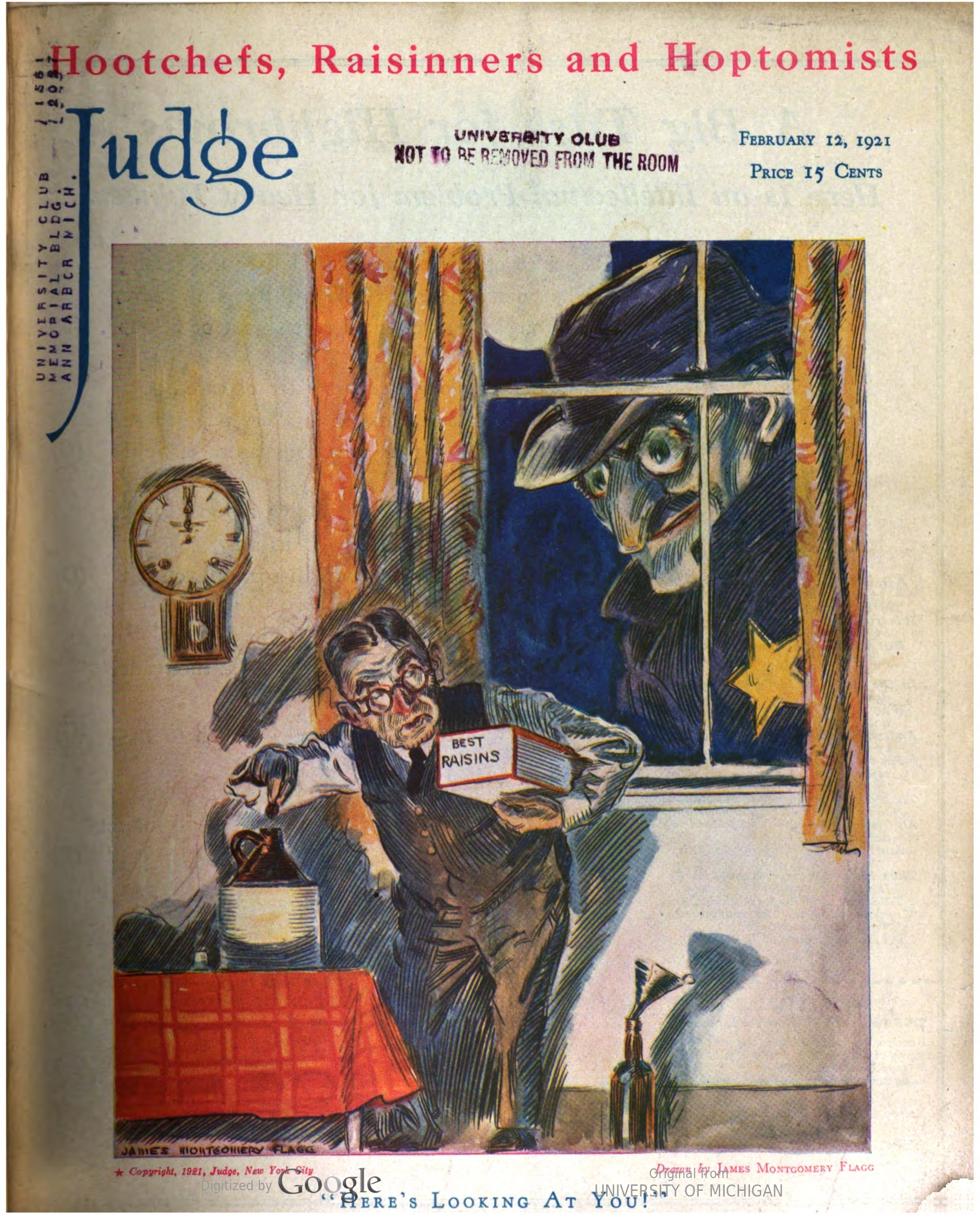
"Here's Looking at You!": this 12 Feb 1921 cover of Judge from the prohibition era references the practice of making moonshine with dried fruit.

Moonshining has always been popular in the southeastern part of the United States, especially in farm communities, partly because farmers have the produce (corn, barley, apples, grapes, etc.) to make illegal liquor. In some cases, farmers use produce they cannot sell to make moonshine for a profit. Lengthy prison sentences for those caught manufacturing or distributing illegal alcohol makes moonshiners conceal their still sites in secret locations. Stills are unique contraptions that typically consist of several metal drums, copper pipes, and heat sources that heat the mash of sugar, starch and fruit or grain product. The weight and overall size of stills makes concealment difficult. This has led many moonshiners to hide their still sites in very clever locations; most of these moonshiners take refuge deep in the backwoods of America, in abandoned barns in addition to underground structures and tunnels. A classic example of underground still sites that are still being utilized today is the usage of old abandoned mining tunnels. This idea is said to have started in the old mining caves in Tennessee soon after the civil war. Illegal distillers would use these caves because it provided adequate cover that protected them from being discovered by law enforcement officers. American moonshiners also preferred the use of caves due to the natural abundance of water that the caves provided; which is a key ingredient of moonshine. These caves were used to manufacture moonshine until well into the 20th century.

During prohibition (which lasted from 1920 to 1933), the sale, manufacture and distribution of alcohol was severely curtailed. This new legal sanction created a landslide of illegal distribution of liquor and moonshine, which some farmers and illegal distillers would call the golden age of moonshining. Since alcohol was illegal, moonshiners and bootleggers faced a high demand for liquor that allowed them to have a monopoly over the alcohol trade in the United States. The Great Depression—from 1929 to 1939—also contributed to the popularity of moonshining in the United States. During that time of economic hardship, many Americans turned to manufacturing and distributing illegal products. In the southern states, some moonshiners sold their product to bootleggers, who transported it all over the country, often selling to crime syndicates such as that run by Al Capone.

As early as prohibition, there have been stories of moonshiners using their product as a powerful fuel in their automobiles, usually when evading law-enforcement agencies while delivering their illegal product. The sport of stock car racing got its start when moonshiners would modify their automobiles to outrun federal government revenue agents. Junior Johnson, one of the early stock car racers in the mountains of North Carolina who was associated with running moonshine, has even "gone legitimate" by marketing a legally produced grain alcohol, which is made by the first legal distillery in the state. Stokesdale, a town not far from where the distillery is located, has a moonshine still on its official town seal to reflect corn liquor's history in the town's past.

=== Zimbabwe ===
Skokiaan (Chikokiyana), an illegal self-made alcoholic beverage, lent its name to the internationally known tune Skokiaan.
