= Sulai =

Rectified spirit brewed in the Northeast Indian state of Assam

Sulai is a rectified spirit brewed in the Northeast Indian state of Assam. A clear, colourless alcohol, Sulai is known as tharra in north India, handia or pheni in Nepal, and referred to as country liquor in colloquial parlance. It is generally brewed from fermented molasses or occasionally rice.

== Preparation ==
In the traditional method, molasses or unrefined treacle are first fermented in a large tin or drum. This is an anaerobic process carried out under controlled conditions of temperature and pH, wherein reducing sugars are broken down to ethyl alcohol and carbon dioxide.

The fermented molasses are then distilled in a large cylindrical metallic vessel continuously over firewood in an earthen oven. Above the main cylinder, a perforated container is placed, inside of which is a metallic collector kept on an iron tripod. The metallic collector is where the distillate sulai is collected. The bottom of the condenser vessel is plastered with mud to prevent excess ventilation during distillation.

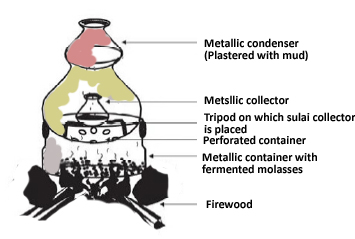
Apparatus by which Sulai is distilled from fermenting molasses

Water is replaced three to five times after it is heated. Condensed Sulai is collected in a small metallic vessel. The strength of the brew is determined by the number of times water is replaced, with the amount of untreated alcohol being higher when this is done fewer times.

Sulai is generally stored in clear, glass bottles. It has a strong pungent odour and is therefore often brewed in fields or away from people's homes. As the brew does not undergo multiple distillation, it has a very high alcohol content and is considered a rectified spirit. Alcohol content can be as much as 40-45%.

== History and political economy of manufacture ==
Sulai is frequently referred to as country spirits, a term that was introduced by the East India Company in 1856 in reference to native modes of liquor preparation. The company began to levee a tax, known as abkaree, for the manufacture and retail of Sulai. Under this monthly tax system, the holder of a license (mahaldar) for country spirits could not brew more than ten gallons per day. Licensed distilleries were both private and government-owned. To each distillery was attached an excise establishment consisting of a daroga and a few peons. The spirit manufactured was tested with a hydrometer and measured by the daroga without whose knowledge no spirit could be removed from the distillery. This regulation of manufacture meant that the brewing of sulai without a permit was illicit, a law that continues to hold in Assam today.

Although illegal, certain rural people in Assam are economically dependent on sulai, which is commonly sold in liquor stills (sulai bhatti) and private retail units.

== Consumption and cultural references ==
Sulai is generally drunk directly without addition of water. Fried meat or any other curry is a frequent accompaniment. Traditionally, sulai is consumed by people from lower caste ethnic groups. Significant stigma is associated with consuming the brew, and scholars have argued that elites have historically constituted it as a drink of the 'lowly' classes.

== See also ==
- Tharra, a similar brew from north India
