= Gamkaskloof =

Valley in Western Cape, South Africa

Coordinates: 33.3415°S 21.8768°E

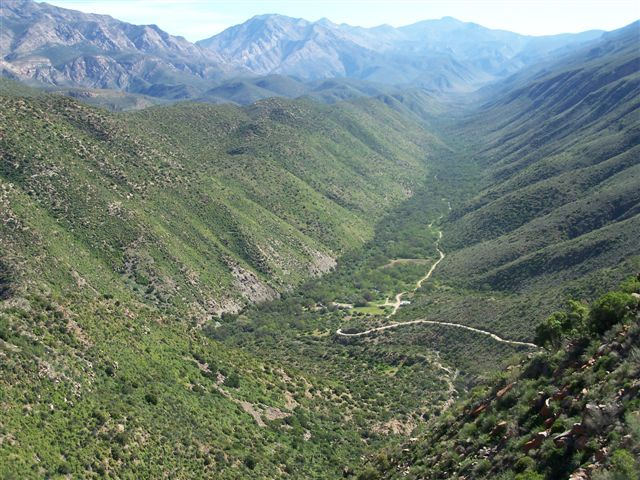
The pass down to Gamkaskloof.

The Gamkaskloof (Afrikaans pronunciation: [ˌχamkasˈkluəf]), also known as Die Hel (pronounced [di ˈɦæl]; lit. 'The Hell'), is a narrow, isolated valley about 20 kilometres (12.4 miles) long and a maximum of 600 metres (656 yards) wide. The valley is located in the Swartberg mountain range, which is part of the Garden Route District Municipality, Western Cape Province, South Africa.

== History ==
Gamkaskloof is a hybrid name, combining Gamka (the Khoisan word for Lion), and Kloof (the Afrikaans word for valley).

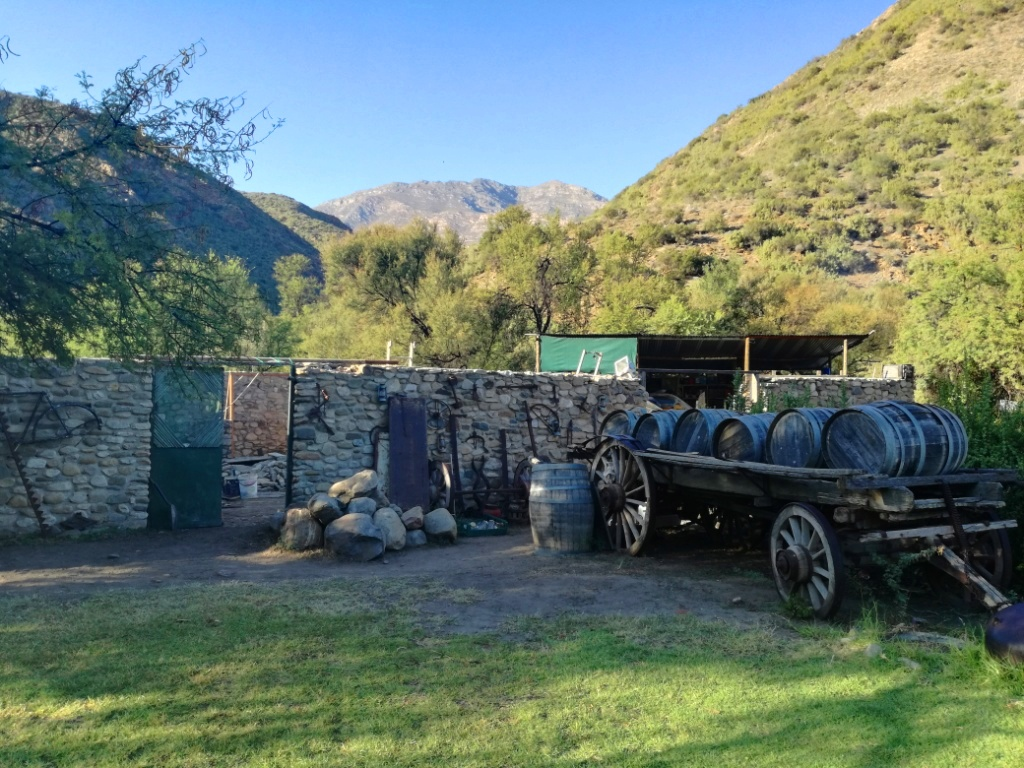
Wagon and farm equipment at Die Hel settlement

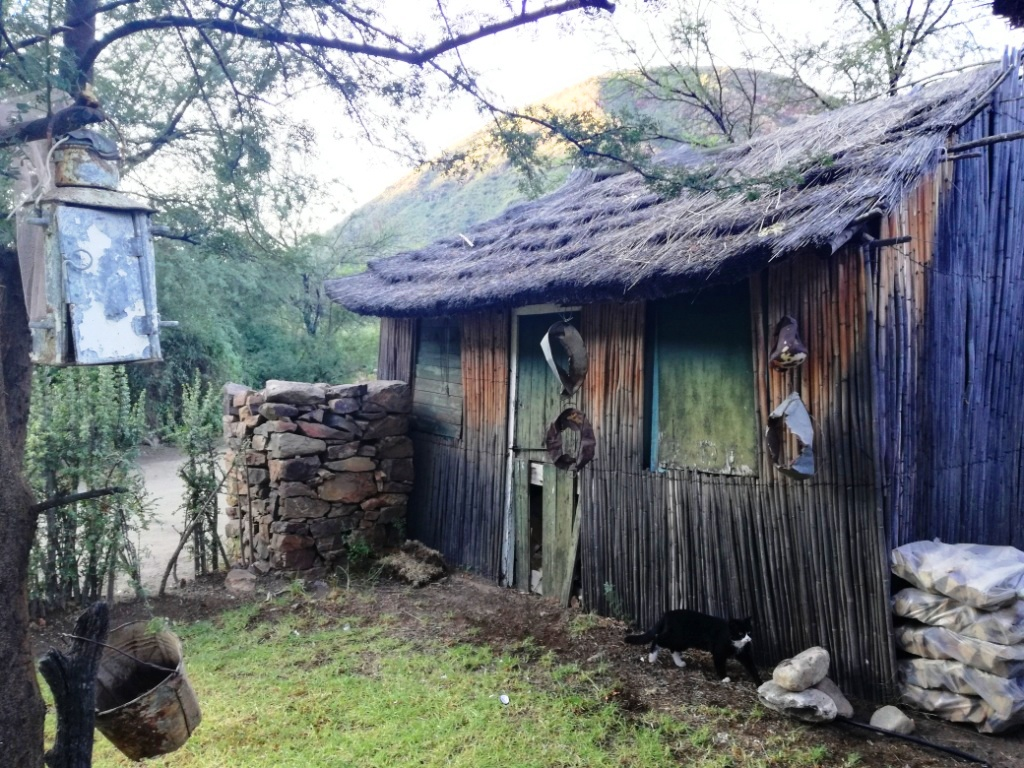
Buildings in the original settlement in Die Hel.

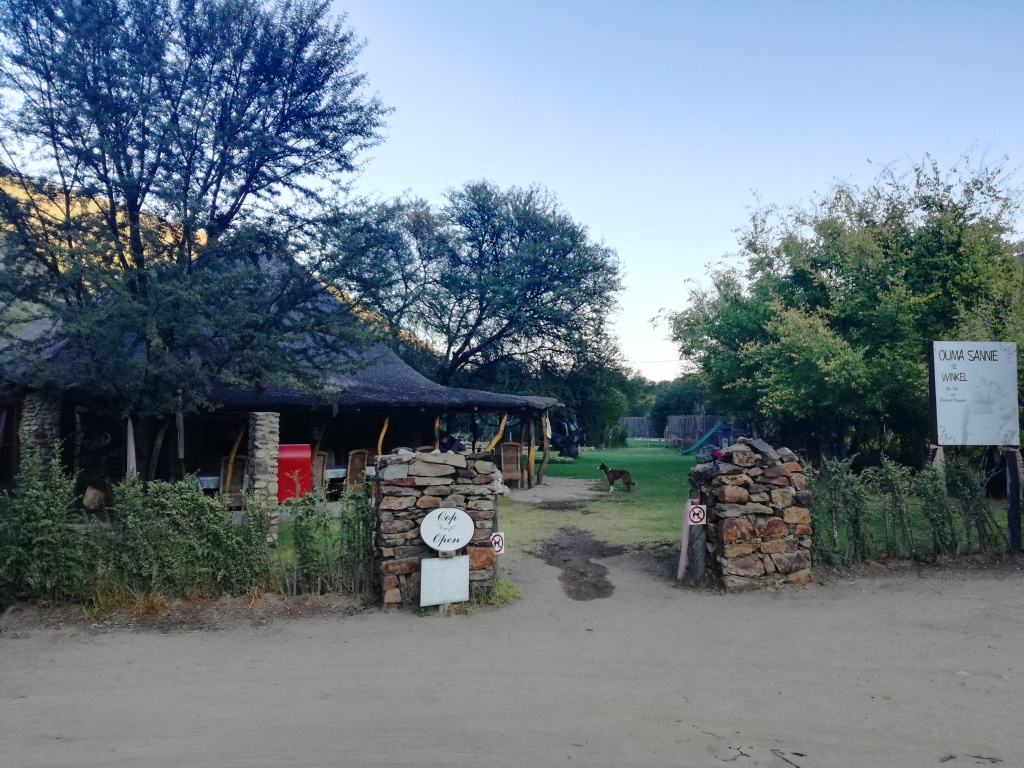
Restaurant from renovated building

The Gamkaskloof was discovered in the early 19th century by farmers, but the first permanent resident was Pieter Swanepoel, who settled in the valley in the 1830s. Some time later, the Marais, Cordier and Joubert Nel Mostert families settled in the valley, growing to a community of around 160 people. The residents used donkeys and travelled by foot across the Swartberg mountains to reach Prince Albert and Calitzdorp. Later, a school was established, with the teacher also leading the Sunday church. The settlers farmed grain, vegetables, fruits, tea and tobacco. They also distilled witblits, and brewed beer from wild honey.

For many years, the residents petitioned the South African government to build a road into the valley. In 1962, the requested road was completed. Ironically, this led to the depopulation of the community, with the local children attending high schools in the nearby villages and most of them refusing to return to a life of subsistence farming in the valley. The elderly residents retired to retirement villages outside the valley, with the number of permanent residents diminishing. Eventually, all homes except one were sold to the Western Cape Nature Conservation Board, with the last sale taking place in 1991.

The Gamkaskloof valley was declared a national monument in 1997, and was subsequently included into the Swartberg Nature Reserve. The cottages in the valley have been renovated, and equipped with solar power and bathrooms.

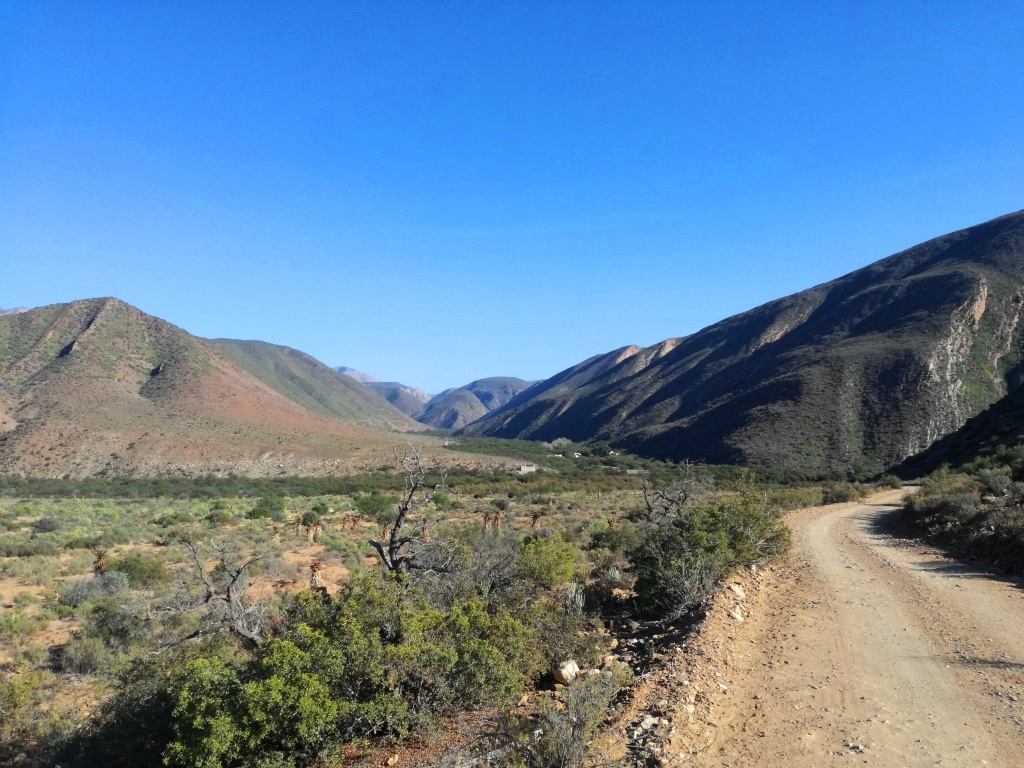
View towards Gamka river, from the bottom of the valley at Die Hel

== Die Hel ==
The only formal road by which the Gamkaskloof can be accessed drops very steeply for almost 579 metres (633 yards) before reaching the valley settlement. It is believed that the name Die Hel was derived from the Afrikaans word helling or hel, meaning a steep dip or incline. However, this is subject to debate and several folk toponyms and explanations have evolved. One popular story is that an animal inspector named Piet Botha visited the valley in the 1940s, using a particularly difficult route known as Die Leer on Kleinberg, and subsequently described the experience as "hell". The residents of Gamkaskloof are averse to the name Die Hel, and refer to themselves as Klowers (the Afrikaans word for 'Canyon dwellers').

== Activities ==
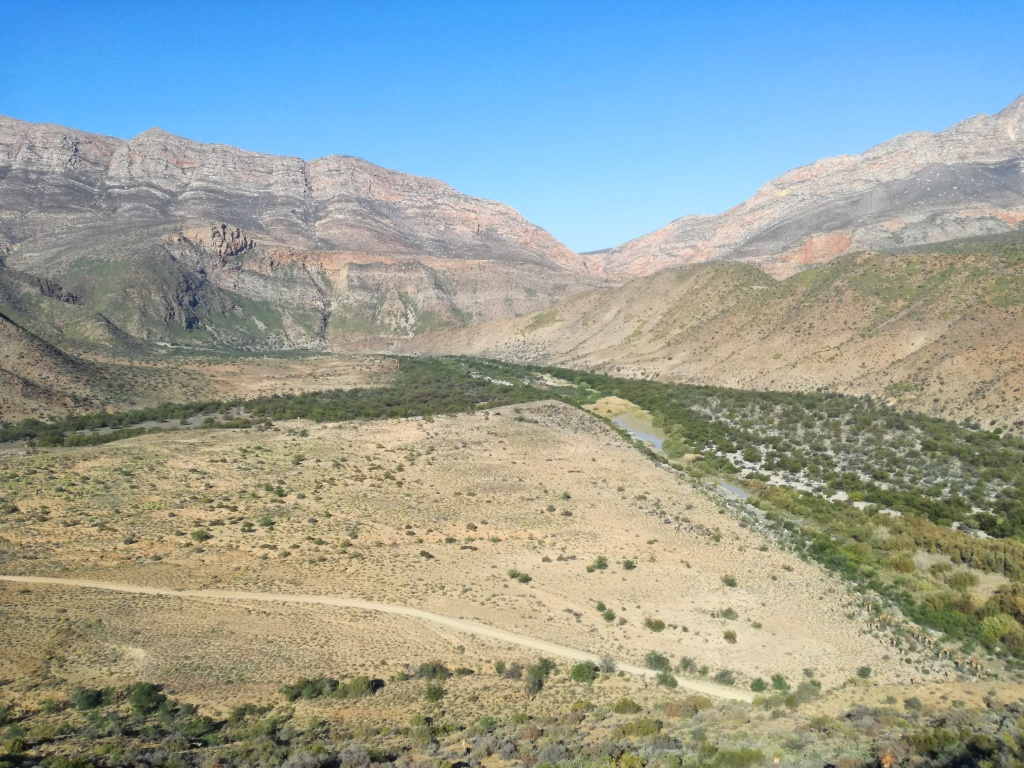
View of the road where it passes the Gamka river

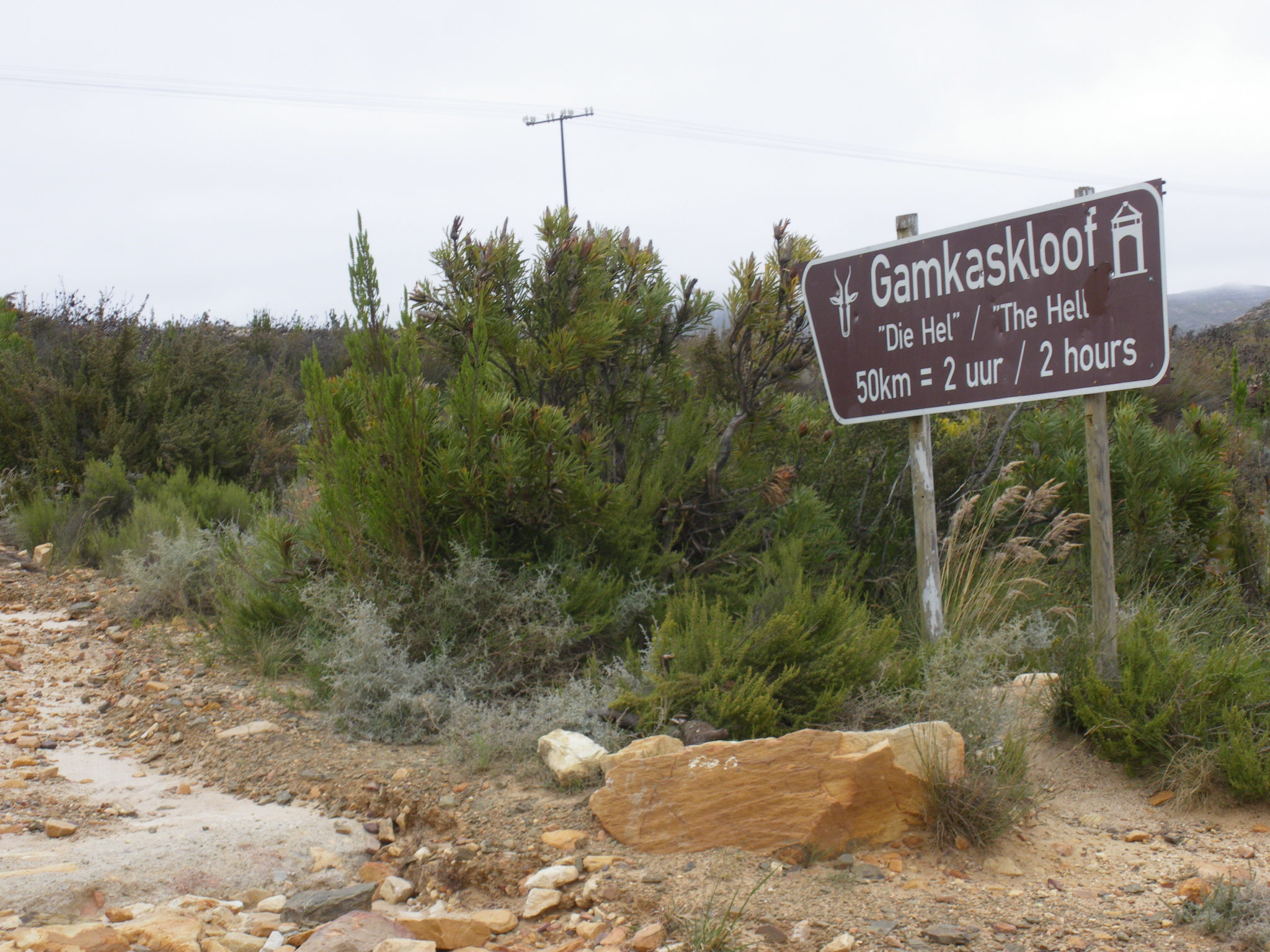
The crossroad to Gamkaskloof at the Swartberg Pass in 2008

Gamkaskloof's isolation makes it popular among sports enthusiasts. Hiking is a popular activity. The valley also hosts a mountain bike race named To Hell & Back, and a trail run known as the MadScientists' Midnight Hell Run (formerly the Moonlight Hell Run). A number of adventure races have and still do, also used Gamkaskloof as part of their route. This includes the likes of the Freedom Challenge.
