= Waragi =

Ugandan distilled beverage

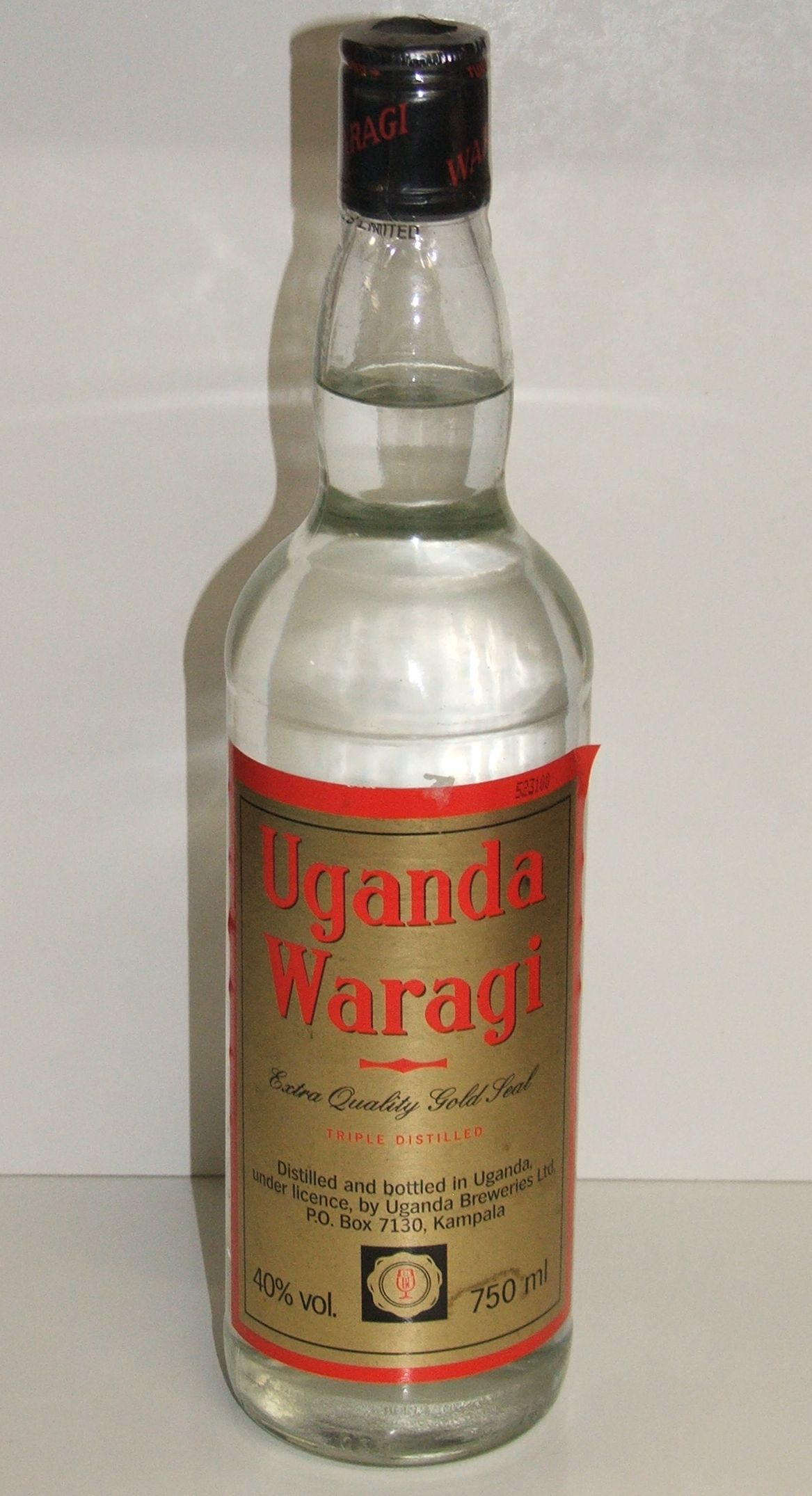
Uganda Waragi

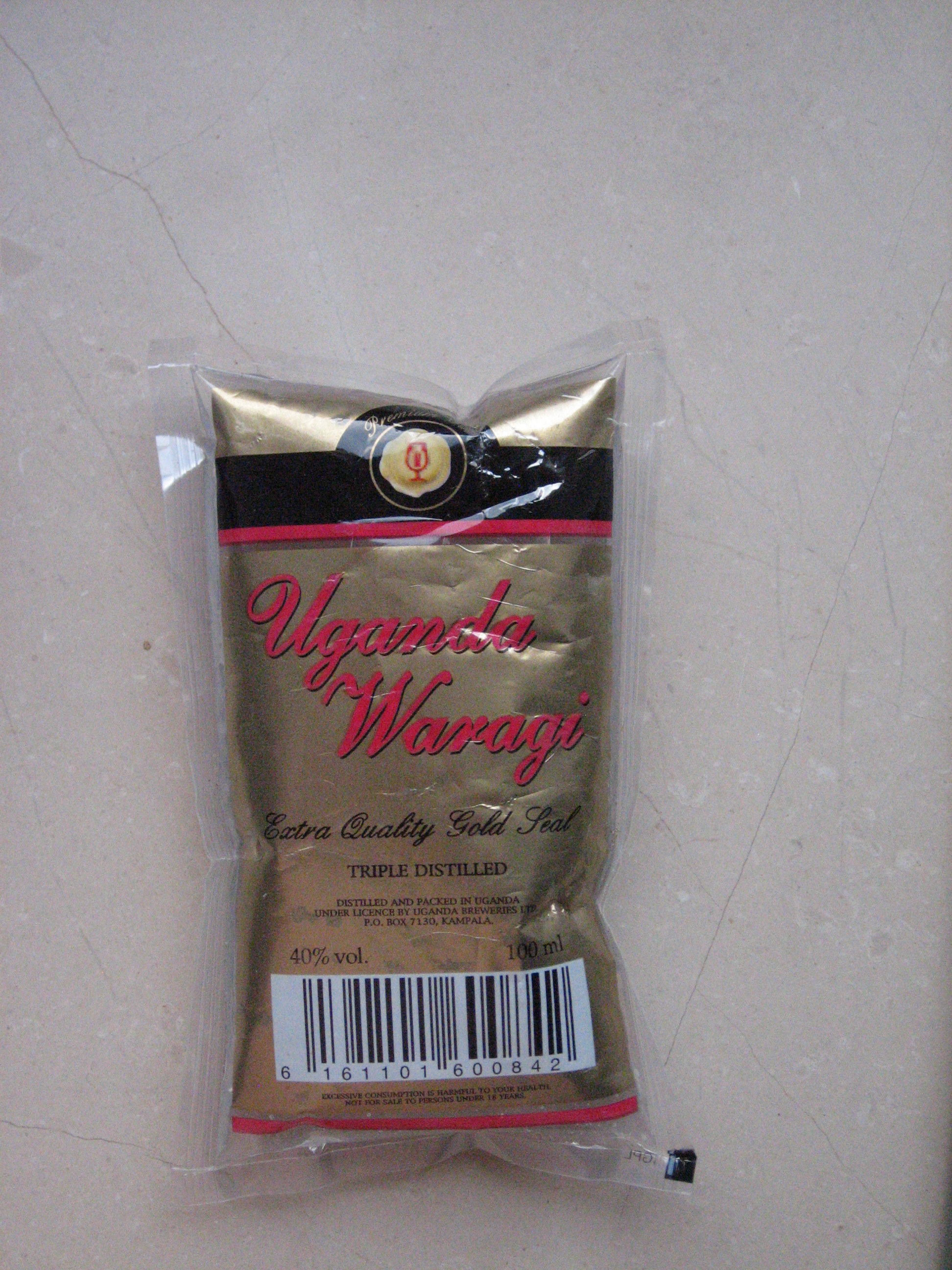
A small bag of Uganda Waragi

Waragi (pronounced [ˈwaɾaɡi], also known as kasese) is a generic term in Uganda for domestic distilled beverages. Waragi is also given different names, depending on region of origin, the distillation process, or both. Waragi is known as a form of homemade Gin. The term "Waragi" is synonymous with locally distilled gin throughout Uganda. However, Uganda Waragi is a particular brand of industrially distilled gin produced by East African Breweries Limited. Other brands of distilled gin which are done by individuals at small scale are also available, but they are different from each other. The most common are: 1. "Kasese-Kasese" which was originally distilled in the district of Kasese in western Uganda and sold all over the country; 2. "Arege mogo" which first originated in Lira district in northern Uganda made and sold all over the country . These two brands "waragi" have different tastes and aromas. The distillation process in both cases produce highly distilled gin at the level produced industrially.

Moonshining and consumption of waragi and other alcoholic beverages is widespread in Uganda. In the 2004 WHO Global Status Report on Alcohol, Uganda ranked as the world's leading consumer of alcohol (per capita). Based on results from 2007, Uganda’s overall alcohol consumption was an average of 17.6 litres per capita. This is unusually high compared to surrounding countries. In 2016 this seems no longer the case, with total consumption of pure alcohol down to 9.5 litres per capita (≥ 15 years of age).

== History ==
The history of waragi in Uganda can be traced to the period of Ugandan history during the colonial era. Gins were introduced to Uganda by British soldiers who were stationed in the Uganda Protectorate, and soon became a popular drink among Ugandans. The rise of Waragi occurred after the 1919 Treaty of St. Germain, when the protectorate government passed new laws aimed at prohibiting Africans from consuming spirits. The protectorate government did this to control the production and sale of tonto, a beer (most popular at the time) made from fermented banana juice. People were looking for better options, and many found waragi to be one of them. Waragi is highly concentrated and doesn’t spoil in a few days like tonto does, making it easy to transport over long distances. As many women couldn't legally produce tonto, they turned to the illegal production and sale of waragi, which was a symbol of power and status. In 1960, the colonial government passed the Liquor Act, which implemented limitations on the production and consumption of locally produced gins in the colony. Although the act was ostensibly passed in order to prevent Ugandans from experiencing negative health effects as a result of the dangerous production methods of moonshining, economic motivations were also in play; the colonial government wished to ensure the dominance of imported gins from Britain in the Ugandan alcohol market, which was being undercut by local gin production via moonshiners. Locally produced gin quickly proved more popular than those imported from Britain, thanks in part due to their cheaper prices. Ugandan politicians, led by the Uganda People's Congress (UPC), protested against the act, arguing that the colonial government should have instead ordered the construction of a distillery factory in the colony so Ugandans who desired gin would not resort to the dangerous practice of moonshining. When the UPC came to power, it ordered the construction of a distillery factory, naming the gin produced there Uganda Waragi. The factory was staffed with a group of 26 blenders who formed the Association of Uganda Distillers and Vitners, which was headed by Joel Sentamu.

After Ugandan independence in 1962, the government of Uganda passed the Enguli Act of 1965, which was designed to encourage local producers of enguli to supply their produce to the distillery factory, in addition to stipulating that moonshining could only be done with government-issued licenses; this was done so the gin industry in Uganda could be regulated and taxed by the government. Furthermore, those who received their licenses from the Ugandan government were directed to sell their enguli to the distillery. When the factory received enguli, they used them in the production of Uganda Waragi.

Waragi derives its name from "war gin", as the British expatriates in the 1950s and 1960s referred to the distilled spirit known in Luganda language as enguli. The pronunciation with the hard [ɡ] sound is more common; those who are aware of the English origins of the word often favour a "j" sound for [ˈwaɾadʒi]. Its appearance first came about when the British were first starting to establish control over East Africa. They used brigades of Sudanese colonial soldiers to help with the feat, and they concocted the alcohol to help keep up good spirits amongst the troops. It then spread throughout Uganda. Another theory is that the name is a corruption of "Arak" the North African spirit with which the Nubian soldiers would have been familiar.

The colonial authorities of Uganda banned the drink and the laws still exist. Locals at the time would not drink it publicly because drinks that were less harmful to them were also off limits then.

In 1965, "The Enguli Act" decreed that distillation would only be possible under licence and that distillers should sell their product to the government run Uganda Distilleries Ltd, which produced a branded bottled product, marketed under the name Uganda Waragi (distilled from millet and today wholly produced by East African Breweries Limited). "The Enguli Act" was never successfully enforced, as unlicensed production of waragi persisted.

Ugandans were growing concerned about the production and sale of tot packs, small, cheap plastic pouches of waragi. These tot packs made it easy access for schoolchildren to get alcohol because they were small and could be easily hidden. Sometimes methylated spirits found their way to these tot packs and caused death and blindness in young children. After several failed attempts in 2006 and 2009, the government finally passed the National Alcohol Control Policy in 2019, banning the sale of tot packs.

People in Uganda now drink the harsh gin and authorities largely ignore the law. It is sold in shops and bars across Uganda and a distilled version is sold overseas. The product that is sold overseas is double and sometimes triple distilled from the alcohol that village distillers make for the factories in Uganda. When it is distilled, flavours are added and many impurities and dangerous parts of the alcohol are filtered out.

=== Health concerns ===
In April 2010, 80 people died from multiple organ dysfunction syndrome after drinking waragi adulterated with a high amount of methanol over a three-week period in Kabale District. Many of the deaths were blamed on the reluctance of people to openly admit their relatives had been drinking it, allowing the abuse of the substance to continue. When revelations came about houses were searched, with around 120 jerrycans uncovered. The death toll of 80 was arrived at after 15 people died in the period between April 23 and the weekend before. Deaths in Kamwenge went from five to nine after four people died on 21 April. Two people were hospitalised at Kamwenge's Ntara Health Centre IV and five were hospitalised at Mbarara Regional Referral Hospital. BBC correspondent Joshua Mmali described it as "the largest number killed at one time for several years."

In June 2017 a cluster investigation in Wakiso District attributed 12 deaths to locally distilled waragi adulterated with methanol levels 24 times the legal limit.

== Process ==
Waragi is typically made from fermented plant materials such as banana, cassava, millet and sugar cane.

=== Ingredients ===
Most household distillers rely on beer bananas. Bunches are ripened in an earthen pit for about a week, then crushed; the juice is filtered, diluted in roughly a 3:1 ratio with water and inoculated with roasted, ground sorghum or other cereal malt to trigger spontaneous fermentation that lasts one to two days. Alternatives include sugar-cane juice—extracted and fermented in the same way—and boiled mashes of cassava or millet, chosen according to local crop patterns.

=== Distillation ===
The fermented liquor (tonto) is transferred to improvised pot stills made from recycled metal drums, sealed with banana leaves or clay and heated over wood fires. Roughly six 20-litre jerrycans of tonto yield one jerrycan of crude waragi; redistilling that output with additional tonto produces a stronger grade known informally as “super waragi”. Smallholders typically recover 15–20 % distillate by volume, adjusting cuts by taste and using cooling coils improvised from scrap pipes.

=== Industrial production ===
Uganda Waragi, first bottled in 1965 under the Enguli licensing scheme, uses the same banana–millet base but undergoes triple copper-pot distillation to rectify the spirit to 96 % ABV before blending and filtration; botanical flavourings such as lime peel, nutmeg and cassia bark are added at this stage to create a clear, spicy gin.

=== By-products and environmental impact ===
Illicit stills discard a viscous black residue rich in molasses, residual ethanol and unidentified chemicals, often dumping it directly into nearby soil or waterways.

=== In culture ===
Vice devoted an episode of their web series Fringes to the process of making and distributing Waragi. The episode also covered the cultural significance of Waragi in Uganda, with reporter Thomas Morton imbibing various distillations of the traditional beverage.

== Variants ==
The base of waragi distillate can be made from either cassava, bananas, millet or sugar cane, depending on the crops grown in the region. The most popular (besides the branded Uganda Waragi) are Lira Lira and Kasese. Lira Lira is made mainly from cassava flour and cane sugar, and is named after the town of Lira. Kasese, named after the town of Kasese, is a potent banana gin. Waragi may also be known as "regular" or "super."

== See also ==
- Changaa (in Kenya)
- Uganda Waragi
- East Africa Breweries Limited
- Enguli Act
- Kumi Kumi
- Lotoko
- Arak
- Uganda
