= Onyx Moonshine =

American twice-distilled alcoholic beverage

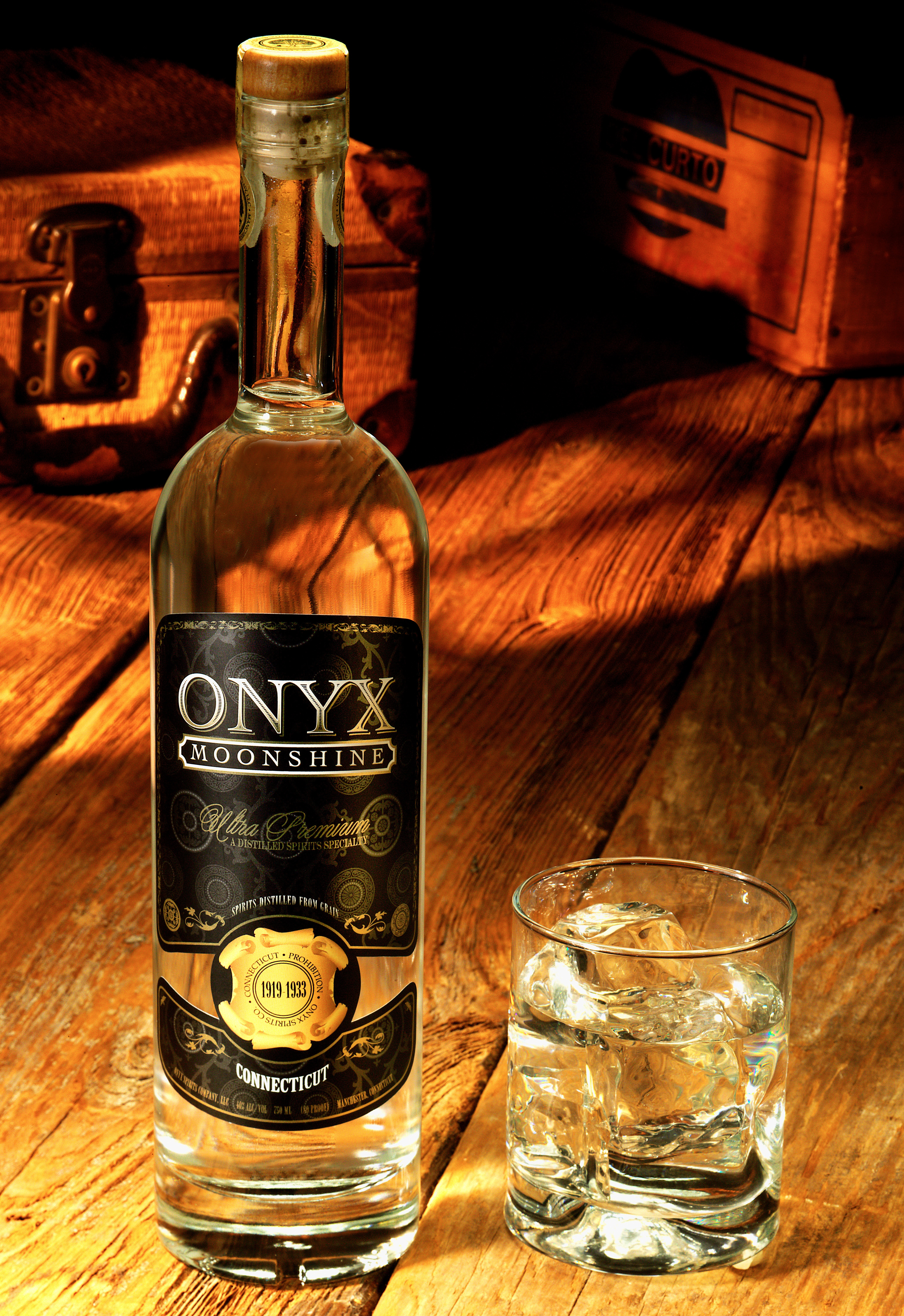
- Type: distilled beverage
- Manufacturer: Onyx Spirits Company
- Origin: Connecticut, United States
- Introduced: 2011
- Alcohol by volume: 40.0%
- Proof (US): 80
- Website: onyxspirits.com

Onyx Moonshine is an American twice-distilled alcoholic beverage. Although legally produced, it is marketed as "moonshine". It is made in a microdistillery in East Hartford, Connecticut. It was the official spirit of the 2012 Grammy Awards.

== Production ==
Onyx Spirits, the company that produces Onyx Moonshine, was founded by Adam von Gootkin and Peter Kowalczyk in 2011.

The product is distilled in reflux column stills from a mash of mixed corn and grain. After two distillations it is approximately 80% ABV, and is then diluted to bottling strength. The bottles are corked and labeled by hand.

The product is distributed in Connecticut, Massachusetts and Rhode Island.
