= Witblits =

Clear spirit

Witblits, or White Lightning (which later became a nickname for Allan Donald for his fast bowling speed and his quick and terrifying pace) is a clear spirit that has been distilled in South Africa for many years. Witblits is predominately produced in the Western Cape where it has enjoyed over 200 years. Many producers take great pride in their product, often brewing small batches to sell at informal markets so as to maintain or improve their recipes. Another name used to describe this alcoholic beverage is "firewater", a name earned without a doubt from the strong punch it delivers.

== Brief history ==
In 1924 KWV was granted legal control over the production of wine, spirits and brandy. Accordingly, the distillation of Witblits was criminalized for many years. Although KWV maintained a monopoly on certain lines of liquor, it is evident that many traditions and familial practices could be maintained. Once the ban was lifted distilling for personal use is now legal, provided an appropriate license is obtained.

== Characteristics ==
Witblits is a brandy made from grapes, usually by using leftovers from the winery. Witblits is un-aged, meaning no maturation takes place which results in the liquid staying quite clear. Another one of Witblits' traits is that it is undiluted; this gives it its characteristically high proof. These factors, as with Mampoer, allow us to classify Witblits as Moonshine. The association to Moonshine should not necessarily be linked to quality. Many farmers take pride in making witblits using refined handed down recipes resulting in a brandy of higher quality than typical moonshine.

== Witblits versatility ==
Drinking - The dominant reason for production. Witblits consumption is associated with social activities as well as those of relaxation.

Cleaning Agent - Thanks to Witblits' high alcohol content it is really good at cutting through stains and clean them up. Add to this that the alcohol has a strong smell and evaporates quickly, it can be used to assist with deodorizing too.

Medical Applications - Witblits is a strong disinfectant, again due to the high alcohol content. Alcohol denatures proteins very well and by extension germs too. Soaking items in Witblits or rubbing it onto an area where skin is going to be pierced (Example. injections and piercings) will reduce the risk of infection.

Herbal Remedies - The high alcoholic content has found use by many as a solvent in tinctures, increasing the shelf-life and effectiveness of the flowers and herbs in use.

== Marketing and promotion ==
Various farms producing Witblits in the Western Cape have scheduled witblits tastings and witblits tours to promote the liquor and raise the profile of their brands. In Philippolis, located in the Free State Province, an annual Witblits Festival is held every April, where visitors to the festival and taste and purchase their Witblits liquors. If you do find yourself attending the Wiblits Festival, be prepared to witness or partake in the ’bokdrol spoeg’ a competition which involves spitting Witblits-soaked kudu droppings.

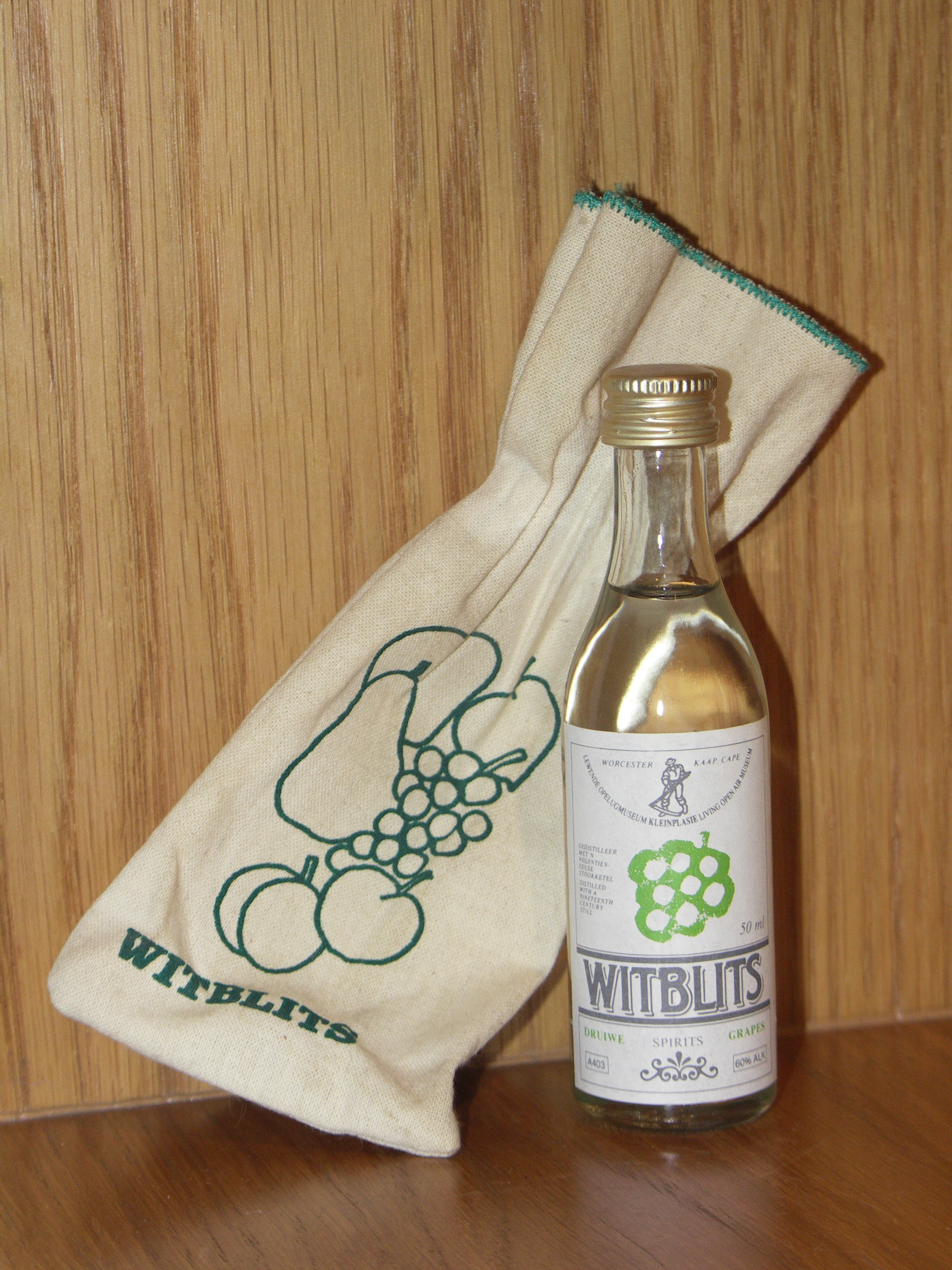
A bottle of Witblits

Brand Name	Alcohol%	Notes
Hanzet Witblits	43%	
Akkedis Built Witblits	55%	
Wurm Sous	70%	contains pickled Mopane worms
Nyati J Nyati JJJ JJ	60%	Jack’s Jungle Juice
Ronnie Sex Shop’s Witblits		
Brandslang	50%	
Witblits, Windpomp	50%	
Byt	45%	
Boegoeblits	50%	

== Legal concerns ==
Witblits distillation for the purpose of large volume resale is illegal in South Africa. In 1924 the government passed legislation which gave KWV a monopoly on brandy production. All stills had to be marked and registered with Customs and Excise, and detailed records kept as to the amount and strength of any liquor produced. Farmers were allowed to produce liquor only from fruit grown on their land. In the United States of America moonshine is illegal mainly due to the revenue that it produces compared to beer or wine. The tax excise on spirits is approximately $2.14 per bottle compared to $0.14 per bottle of wine and $0.05 per can of beer. There is also a concern for the health of consumers thereof and the safety risk behind homemade brewing due to the apparatus involved. In some South African states a person can still purchase a legal version of witblits or moonshine from commercial distillers. Total volume produced cannot exceed a fixed amount per year as detailed in local South African laws.

== See also ==
- Moonshine
- Moonshine by country
- Philippolis
- Tincture
- Distillation
