= Changaa =

Distilled alcoholic beverage

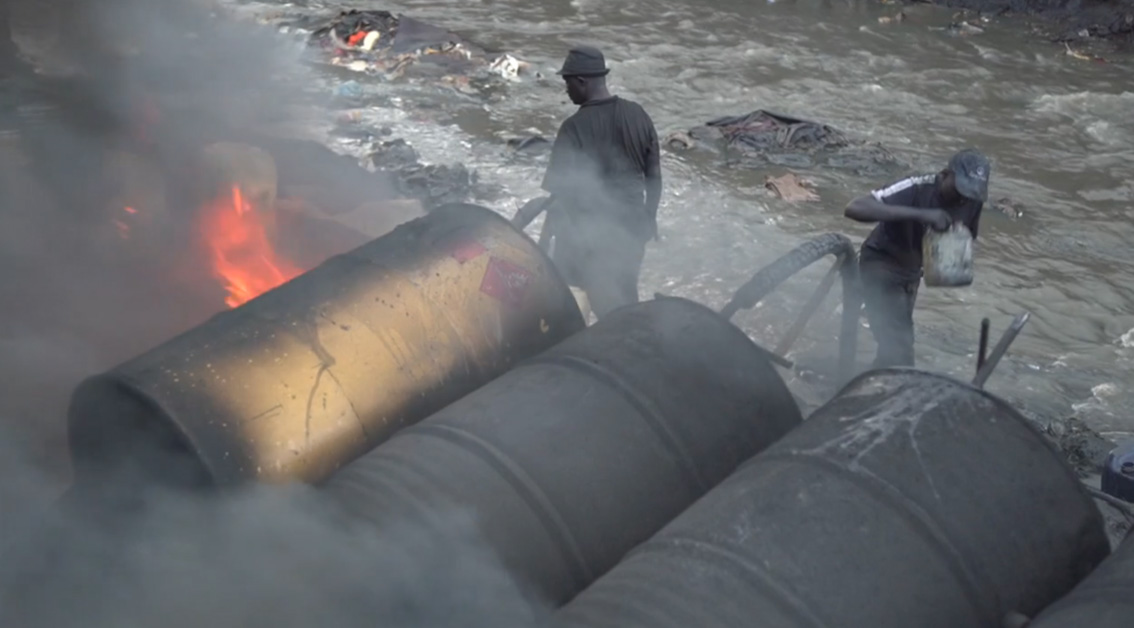
Chang'aa being made

Chang'aa is a traditional home-brewed spirit, popular in Kenya. It is made by fermentation and distillation from grains like millet, maize and sorghum, and is very potent.

== Regulation ==
After being illegal in Kenya for many years, the Kenyan government legalised the traditional home-brewed spirit in 2010, in an effort to take business away from establishments where toxic chemicals are added to the brew to make it stronger. Under the new law, chang'aa must be manufactured, distributed and sold in glass bottles, and retailers must display health warning signs. Sale to individuals under age 18 is still prohibited, as is sale through automatic vending machines. Anyone making or selling adulterated chang'aa risks penalties of five million shillings, five years in jail, or both. Chang'aa is usually much cheaper and stronger than other alcoholic drinks, making it the beverage of choice for many.

== Production and distribution ==
Its production and distribution in urban slums has to some extent continued to be controlled in many cases by criminal gangs ran cartels for illicit brewers. However, in the rest of the country production is still under traditional brewers. Illegally brewed chang'aa could be purchased for around US$0.20 to $0.40 per glass.

=== Health concerns ===
The drink is sometimes adulterated by adding substances like jet fuel, embalming fluid or battery acid, which has the effect of giving the beverage more 'kick'. Drinkers have suffered blindness or death due to methanol poisoning. The water used to make the drink in illegal breweries is also often below acceptable health standards and sometimes contaminated with sewage.

== Origin of name ==
The spirit's name, Chang'aa, means literally "kill me quick."

The name Chang'aa was adopted in the 1950s when Oyuga Muganda, an AP in Kisumu, once narrated the story in the presence of Tom Omuga how Pelele (a.k.a. Woraj) got its name as Chang'aa.

Women from the Kano area of Kisumu used to ferry fresh milk in pots to sell to Kisumu residents. The colonial government had banned the sale of local liquor (Pelele) and so the women carrying milk also carried Pelele disguised as milk.

One day, a white policeman who had been tipped off about the underground trafficking of Pelele stopped the women milk sellers on the road to inspect their pots of "milk". One of the pots had Pelele and not milk.

The policeman ordered all the pots lined on the roadside and asked "Maziwa ya nani?"

An interpreter repeated in Dholuo "Ma Chag ng'a?" (meaning "whose milk is this?").

So the policeman charged the women with transporting and selling Chang'aa. That is allegedly how the name Chang'aa came about.

== See also ==
- Waragi (in Uganda)
