= Masing =

Family name

Masing is a German and Estonian surname. Notable people with the surname include:

- Ernst Johann Woldemar Masing (1836–1923), Baltic German philologist
- Gotthilf Leonhard Masing (1845–1936), Baltic German linguist
- Jaan Masing (1875–1948), Estonian politician and physician
- Johannes Masing (born 1959), German judge, jurisprudent and public law scholar
- Karl Ernst Alexander Masing (1879–1956), Baltic German physician
- Oskar Masing (1874–1947), Baltic German philologist
- Otto Wilhelm Masing (1763–1832), Estonian linguist and clergyman
- Uku Masing (1909–1985), Estonian philosopher, translator, theologist and folklorist
- Viktor Masing (1925–2001), Estonian botanist and ecologist
- Walter Masing (1915–2004), Baltic German physicist
