= Tharra =

Type of Desi daru

Tharra (Hindi: ठर्रा, Urdu: ٹھرا) is a type of Desi daru which is locally, and often illegally, brewed alcoholic drink in the Indian subcontinent, mainly India and Pakistan. It is made from yeast fermentation of sugarcane, or wheat husk, especially in Bihar, Uttar Pradesh, Punjab and Haryana. Since it is usually made from sugarcane, it is often viewed as a crude rum.

== Preparation ==
Due to the pungent smell of the distilling process, Tharra is often prepared in remote fields, away from human settlements. It recycles some of the waste products of the agricultural economy of the region.

== Health concerns ==
According to a study done in Pakistan, homemade liquor Tharra contain many impurities and is often injurious to health.

== Local economy ==
It is often consumed by poor or landless tillers, typically distilled with the connivance of officials and police officers, generating large profits.

== See also ==
- Desi daru
- Kilju
