= Kumi Kumi =

Illegal liquor brewed in Kenya

Kumi Kumi (from Swahili 'kumi' for 'ten') is an illegal liquor brewed in Kenya from sorghum, maize or millet. The cheap, widely brewed drink is popular among lower income Kenyans due to its cheap price. Kumi Kumi is known for its exceptional alcohol content.

Kumi Kumi is so named for its cheap price, KSh.10/= for a mug, which in 2006 comes to roughly US$0.15. Legal beers usually cost around KSh.65/=.

== Health concerns ==
The brew is often doctored in unsafe and poisonous ways, and its regular abuse frequently has resulted in alcohol poisoning related hospitalizations, blindness, and death.
