= Lotoko =

Home-distilled alcoholic drink in the Democratic Republic of The Congo

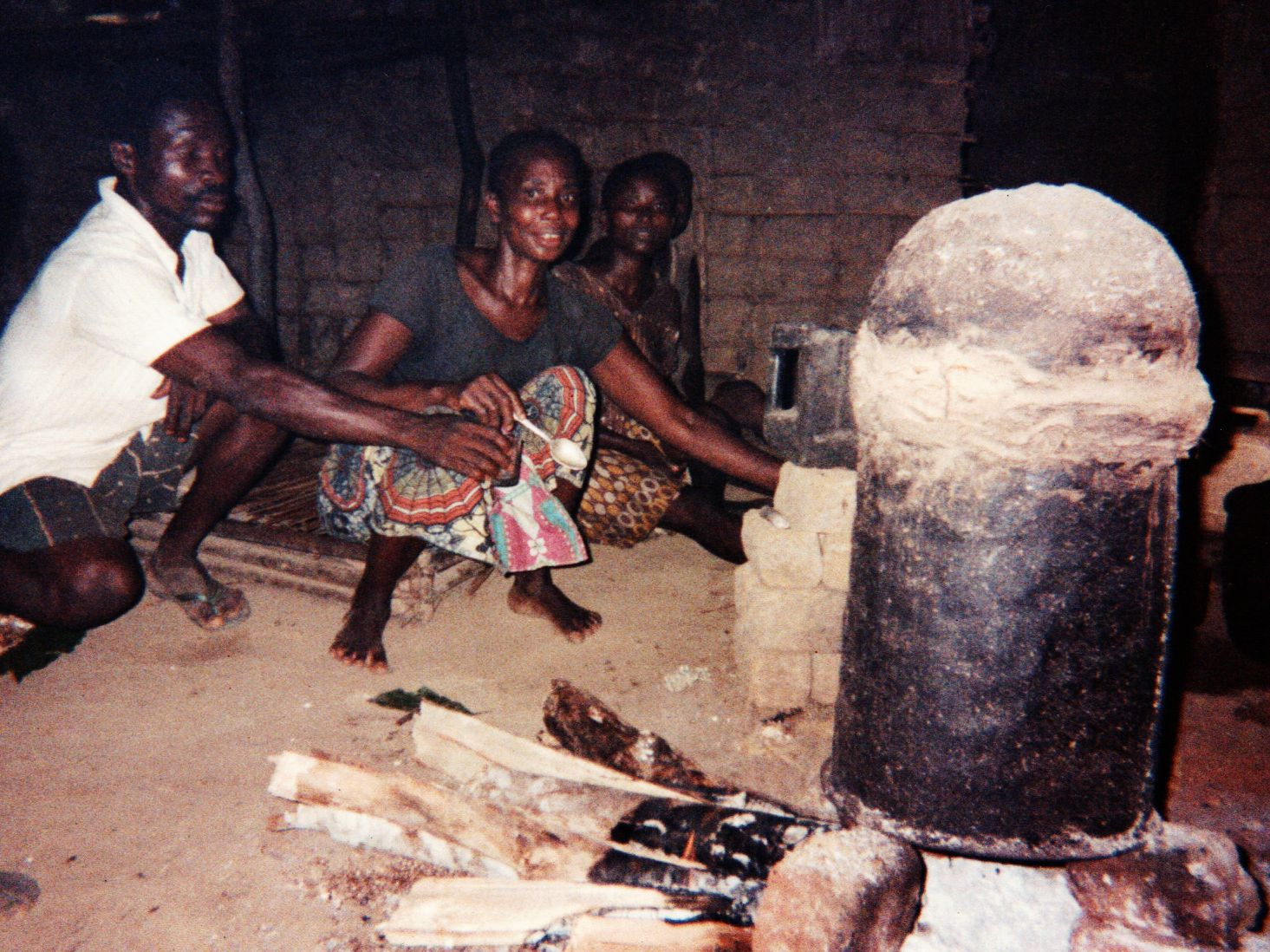
Maize-based lotoko production in an improvised, oil drum still. Baringa, Equateur Province, Democratic Republic of Congo.

Lotoko, also known by the slang term pétrole, is a home-distilled alcoholic drink or moonshine in the Democratic Republic of the Congo.

Lotoko is usually made from maize, but sometimes from cassava or plantain. Heads of corn are cut up and boiled into a mash which is then fermented and distilled using improvised stills made from cut-down oil drums. Although it is officially banned because of its high alcohol content (over 50%), its production is widespread in the Democratic Republic of Congo.

Lotoko production, being a cottage industry, is very low-tech. It provides its mainly female producers with a degree of financial independence.

== Health concerns ==
Because of the woody core of the cobs of corn, the alcohol produced contains high levels of methanol, which is toxic. Lotoko made from cassava or plantains does not carry the same methanol risk.

Local NGOs have expressed concern as to its health effects in the communities of Kinshasa, where it costs 200 to 300 FC, compared to 600 FC for commercially brewed beers.

== Etymology ==
Lotoko is a Lingala word and is known country-wide.
