= List of geographical designations for spirit drinks in the European Union =

List of geographical designations for spirit drinks in the European Union

The geographical designations which may be applied to spirits are defined in Regulation (EC) No 110/2008 on the definition, description, presentation, labelling and the protection of geographical indications of spirit drinks, which repealed the earlier Regulation (EEC) 1576/89. From June 2019, the provisions of Regulation (EC) No 110/2008 have been replaced by Regulation (EU) 2019/787, with the remainder of the 2019 Regulations coming into force in May 2021.

Designations marked with an asterisk may be associated with qualifying phrases: see articles for more details.

== Rum ==
Designation	Country
Rhum de la Martinique	France (Martinique)
Rhum de Guadaloupe	France (Guadeloupe)
Rhum de La Réunion	France (Réunion)
Rhum de la Guyane	France (French Guiana)
Rhum de la sucrerie de la Baie de Galion	France
Rhum des Antilles Françaises	France
Rhum des départements français d'outre-mer	France
Rum da Madeira	Portugal
Ron de Guatemala	Guatemala

== Whisky ==
Designation	Country
Irish Whiskey	Ireland/United Kingdom (Northern Ireland)
Scotch Whisky	United Kingdom (Scotland)
Whisky Breton / Whisky de Bretagne	France
Whisky Alsacien / Whisky d'Alsace	France

== Grain spirit ==
Designation	Country
Korn/Kornbrand	Germany, Austria, Belgium (German-speaking Community)
Münsterländer Korn/Kornbrand	Germany
Sendenhorster Korn/Kornbrand	Germany
Emsländer Korn/Kornbrand	Germany
Haselünner Korn/Kornbrand	Germany
Hasetaler Korn/Kornbrand	Germany
Samanė	Lithuania

== Wine spirit ==
Cognac*	France
Eau-de-vie de Cognac*	France
Eau-de-vie des Charentes*	France
Fine Bordeaux	France
Fine de Bourgogne	France
Armagnac*	France
Eau-de-vie de vin de la Marne	France
Eau-de-vie de vin originaire du Bugey	France
Eau-de-vie-de vin originaire des Côtes-du-Rhone	France
Faugères/Eau-de-vie de Faugères	France
Eau-de-vie de vin originaire du Languedoc	France
Eau-de-vie de vin originaire d'Aquitaine	France
Aguardente de Vinho Douro	Portugal
Aguardente de Vinho Ribatejo	Portugal
Aguardente de Vinho Alentejo	Portugal
Aguardente de Vinho da Região dos Vinhos Verdes	Portugal
Aguardente de Vinho Lourinhã	Portugal
Сунгурларска гроздова ракия/Гроздова ракия от Сунгурларе/ Sungurlarska grozdova rakya/Grozdova rakya from Sungurlare	Bulgaria
Сливенска перла (Сливенска гроздова ракия/Гроздова ракия от Сливен)/ Slivenska perla (Slivenska grozdova rakya/Grozdova rakya from Sliven)	Bulgaria
Стралджанска Мускатова ракия/Мускатова ракия от Стралджа/ Straldjanska Muscatova rakya/Muscatova rakya from Straldja	Bulgaria
Поморийска гроздова ракия/Гроздова ракия от Поморие/ Pomoriyska grozdova rakya/Grozdova rakya from Pomorie	Bulgaria
Бургаска Мускатова ракия/Мускатова ракия от Бургас/ Bourgaska Muscatova rakya/Muscatova rakya from Bourgas	Bulgaria
Сухиндолска гроздова ракия/Гроздова ракия от Сухиндол/ Suhindolska grozdova rakya/Grozdova rakya from Suhindol	Bulgaria
Карловска гроздова ракия/Гроздова Ракия от Карлово/ Karlovska grozdova rakya/Grozdova Rakya from Karlovo	Bulgaria
Гроздова ракия от Търговище/Grozdova rakya ot Targovishte	Bulgaria
'Карнобатска гроздова ракия'/'Гроздова ракия от Карнобат'/'Karnobatska grozdova rakya'/'Grozdova rakya ot Karnobat’	Bulgaria
Vinars Târnave	Romania
Vinars Vaslui	Romania
Vinars Murfatlar	Romania
Vinars Vrancea	Romania
Vinars Segarcea	Romania

== Brandy ==
Designation	Country
Brandy de Jerez	Spain
Brandy del Penedés	Spain
Brandy italiano	Italy
Deutscher Weinbrand	Germany
Wachauer Weinbrand	Austria
Pfälzer Weinbrand	Germany

== Grape marc spirit ==
Designation	Country
Marc de Champagne/Eau-de-vie de marc de Champagne	France
Marc de Bourgogne/Eau-de-vie de marc de Bourgogne	France
Marc du Bugey	France
Marc de Savoie	France
Marc des Côtes du Rhône/Eau-de-vie de marc des Côtes du Rhône	France
Marc de Provence	France
Marc du Languedoc	France
Marc d'Alsace Gewürztraminer	France
Marc d'Auvergne	France
Marc du Jura	France
Aguardente Bagaceira da Bairrada	Portugal
Aguardente Bagaceira do Alentejo	Portugal
Aguardente Bagaceira da Região dos Vinhos Verdes	Portugal
Orujo de Galicia	Spain
Grappa	Italy
Grappa di Barolo	Italy
Grappa piemontese/Grappa del Piemonte	Italy
Grappa lombarda/Grappa di Lombardia	Italy
Grappa trentina/Grappa del Trentino	Italy
Grappa friulana/Grappa del Friuli	Italy
Grappa veneta/Grappa del Veneto	Italy
Südtiroler Grappa/Grappa dell'Alto Adige	Italy
Grappa siciliana/Grappa di Sicilia	Italy
Grappa di Marsala	Italy
Τσικουδιά/Tsikoudia/Τσίπουρο/Tsipouro	Greece
Τσικουδιά Κρήτης/Tsikoudia from Crete	Greece
Τσίπουρο Μακεδονίας/Tsipouro from Macedonia	Greece
Τσίπουρο Θεσσαλίας/Tsipouro from Thessaly	Greece
Τσίπουρο Τυρνάβου/Tsipouro from Tyrnavos	Greece
Ζιβανία/Τζιβανία/Ζιβάνα/Zivania	Cyprus
Törkölypálinka	Hungary

== Fruit spirit ==
Designation	Country
Schwarzwälder Kirschwasser	Germany
Schwarzwälder Mirabellenwasser	Germany
Schwarzwälder Williamsbirne	Germany
Schwarzwälder Zwetschgenwasser	Germany
Fränkisches Zwetschgenwasser	Germany
Fränkisches Kirschwasser	Germany
Fränkischer Obstler	Germany
Mirabelle de Lorraine	France
Kirsch d'Alsace	France
Quetsch d'Alsace	France
Framboise d'Alsace	France
Kirsch de Fougerolles	France
Südtiroler Williams/Williams dell'Alto Adige	Italy
Südtiroler Marille/Marille dell'Alto Adige	Italy
Südtiroler Kirsch/Kirsch dell'Alto Adige	Italy
Südtiroler Zwetschgeler/Zwetschgeler dell'Alto Adige	Italy
Südtiroler Obstler/Obstler dell'Alto Adige	Italy
Südtiroler Gravensteiner/Gravensteiner dell'Alto Adige	Italy
Südtiroler Golden Delicious/Golden delicious dell'Alto Adige	Italy
Williams friulano/Williams del Friuli	Italy
Sliwovitz del Friuli-Veneto Giulia	Italy
Distillato di mele trentino/Distillato di mele del Trentino	Italy
Williams trentino/Williams del Trentino	Italy
Sliwovitz trentino/Sliwovitz del Trentino	Italy
Aprikot trentino/Aprikot del Trentino	Italy
Medronheira do Algarve	Portugal
Kirsch Friulano/Kirschwasser Friulano	Italy
Kirsch Trentino/Kirschwasser Trentino	Italy
Wachauer Marillenbrand	Austria
Szatmári szilvapálinka	Hungary
Kecskeméti barackpálinka	Hungary
Békési szilvapálinka	Hungary
Szabolcsi almapálinka	Hungary
Gönci Barackpálinka	Hungary
Pálinka	Hungary; Austria (Länder of Niederösterreich, Burgenland, Steiermark, Wien)
Újfehértói meggypálinka	Hungary
Brinjevec	Slovenia
Dolenjski sadjevec	Slovenia
Троянска сливова ракия/Сливова ракия от Троян/Troyanska slivova rakya/Slivova rakya from Troyan	Bulgaria
Ловешка сливова ракия/Сливова ракия от Ловеч/Loveshka slivova rakya/Slivova rakya from Lovech	Bulgaria
Pălincă	Romania
Țuică Zetea de Medieșu Aurit	Romania
Țuică de Argeș	Romania
Horincă de Cămârzana	Romania
Hrvatska loza	Croatia
Hrvatska stara šljivovica	Croatia
Slavonska šljivovica	Croatia
Pisco	Peru

== Cider spirit and perry spirit ==
Designation	Country
Calvados	France
Calvados du Pays d'Auge	France
Calvados Domfrontais	France
Eau-de-vie de cidre de Bretagne	France
Eau-de-vie de cidre de Normandie	France
Eau-de-vie de poiré de Normandie	France
Eau-de-vie de cidre du Maine	France
Eau-de-vie de poiré du Maine	France
Aquardiente de sidra de Asturias	Spain
Somerset Cider Brandy	United Kingdom

== Vodka ==
Designation	Country
Svensk Vodka/Swedish Vodka	Sweden
Suomalainen Vodka/Finsk Vodka/Vodka of Finland	Finland
Polska Wódka/Polish Vodka	Poland
Originali Lietuviška degtinė/ Original Lithuanian vodka	Lithuania
Estonian Vodka	Estonia
Norsk Vodka/Norwegian Vodka	Norway

== Geist ==
Designation	Country
Schwarzwälder Himbeergeist	Germany

== Gentian ==
Designation	Country
Bayerischer Gebirgsenzian	Germany
Südtiroler Enzian/Genziana dell'Alto Adige	Italy
Genziana trentina/Genziana del Trentino	Italy

== Juniper-flavoured spirit drinks ==
Designation	Country
Genièvre/Jenever/Genever	Belgium, Netherlands, France (Nord and Pas-de-Calais), Germany (German Bundesländer Nordrhein-Westfalen and Niedersachsen)
Genièvre de grains/Graanjenever/Graangenever	Belgium, Netherlands, France (Nord and Pas-de-Calais)
Jonge jenever/jonge genever	Belgium, Netherlands
Oude jenever/oude genever	Belgium, Netherlands
Hasseltse jenever/Hasselt	Belgium (Hasselt, Zonhoven, Diepenbeek)
Balegemse jenever	Belgium (Balegem)
O' de Flander-Oost-Vlaamse Graanjenever	Belgium (East Flanders)
Peket-Pekêt/Pèket-Pèkèt de Wallonie	Belgium (Wallonia)
Genvièvre Flandres Artois	France
Ostfriesischer Korngenever	Germany
Steinhäger	Germany
Gin de Mahón	Spain
Vilniaus Džinas/Vilnius Gin	Lithuania
Spišská borovička	Slovakia

== Akvavit/aquavit ==
Designation	Country
Svensk Aquavit/Svensk Akvavit/Swedish Aquavit	Sweden

== Aniseed-flavoured spirit drinks ==
Designation	Country
Anís Paloma Monforte del Cid	Spain
Hierbas de Mallorca	Spain
Hierbas Ibicencas	Spain
Chinchón	Spain

== Flavoured vodka ==
Designation	Country
Herbal vodka from the North Podlasie Lowland aromatised with an extract of bison grass/ Wódka ziołowa z Niziny Północnopodlaskiej aromatyzowana ekstraktem z trawy żubrowej	Poland
Polska Wódka/Polish Vodka	Poland
Originali lietuviška degtinė/Original Lithuanian vodka	Lithuania

== Liqueur ==
Designation	Country
Berliner Kümmel	Germany
Hamburger Kümmel	Germany
Münchener Kümmel	Germany
Chiemseer Klosterlikör	Germany
Bayerischer Kräuterlikör	Germany
Irish Cream	Ireland/ United Kingdom (Northern Ireland)
Palo de Mallorca	Spain
Mirto di Sardegna	Italy
Liquore di limone di Sorrento	Italy
Liquore di limone della Costa d'Amalfi	Italy
Genepì del Piemonte	Italy
Genepì della Valle d'Aosta	Italy
Benediktbeurer Klosterlikör	Germany
Ettaler Klosterlikör	Germany
Ratafia de Champagne	France
Ratafia catalana	Spain
Suomalainen Marjalikööri/Suomalainen Hedelmälikööri/ Finsk Bärlikör/Finsk Fruktlikör/ Finnish berry liqueur/Finnish fruit liqueur	Finland
Mariazeller Magenlikör	Austria
Steinfelder Magenbitter	Austria
Wachauer Marillenlikör	Austria
Jägertee/Jagertee/Jagatee	Austria
Hüttentee	Germany
Pelinkovec	El Salvador
Blutwurz	Germany
Cantueso Alicantino	Spain
Licor café de Galicia	Spain
Licor de hierbas de Galicia	Spain
Génépi des Alpes/Genepì delle Alpi	France, Italy
Μαστίχα Χίου/Masticha of Chios	Greece
Κίτρο Νάξου/Kitro of Naxos	Greece
Κουμκουάτ Κέρκυρας/Koum Kouat of Corfu	Greece
Τεντούρα/Tentoura	Greece
Poncha da Madeira	Portugal
Hrvatski pelinkovac	Croatia

== Crème de Cassis ==
Designation	Country
Cassis de Bourgogne	France
Cassis de Dijon	France
Cassis de Saintonge	France

== Sloe-aromatised spirit drink or Pacharán ==
Designation	Country
Pacharán Navarro	Spain

== Maraschino/Marrasquino/Maraskino ==
Designation	Country
Zadarski maraschino	Croatia

== Nocino ==
Designation	Country
Nocino di Modena	Italy
Orehovec	Slovenia

== Bitter-tasting spirit drinks ==
Designation	Country
Riga Black Balsam/Rīgas Melnais balzams	Latvia
Demänovka bylinná horká	Slovakia

== Fruit spirit drinks ==
Designation	Country
Pacharán navarro	Spain

== Other spirit drinks ==
Designation	Country
Pommeau de Bretagne	France
Pommeau du Maine	France
Pommeau de Normandie	France
Svensk Punsch/Swedish Punsch	Sweden
Inländerrum	Austria
Bärwurz	Germany
Aguardiente de hierbas de Galicia	Spain
Aperitivo Café de Alcoy	Spain
Herbero de la Sierra de Mariola	Spain
Ostpreußischer Bärenfang	Germany
Ronmiel de Canarias	Spain
Genièvre aux fruits/Vruchtenjenever/Jenever met vruchten/Fruchtgenever	Belgium, Netherlands, Germany (Nordrhein-Westfalen and Niedersachsen)
Domači rum	Slovenia
Irish Poteen/Irish Poitín	Ireland, United Kingdom (Northern Ireland)
Trauktinė	Lithuania
Trauktinė Palanga	Lithuania
Trauktinė Dainava	Lithuania
Hrvatska travarica	Croatia
Tequila	Mexico

== See also ==
- Protected geographical indication
- Traditional food
