= Zivania =

Cypriot alcoholic beverage

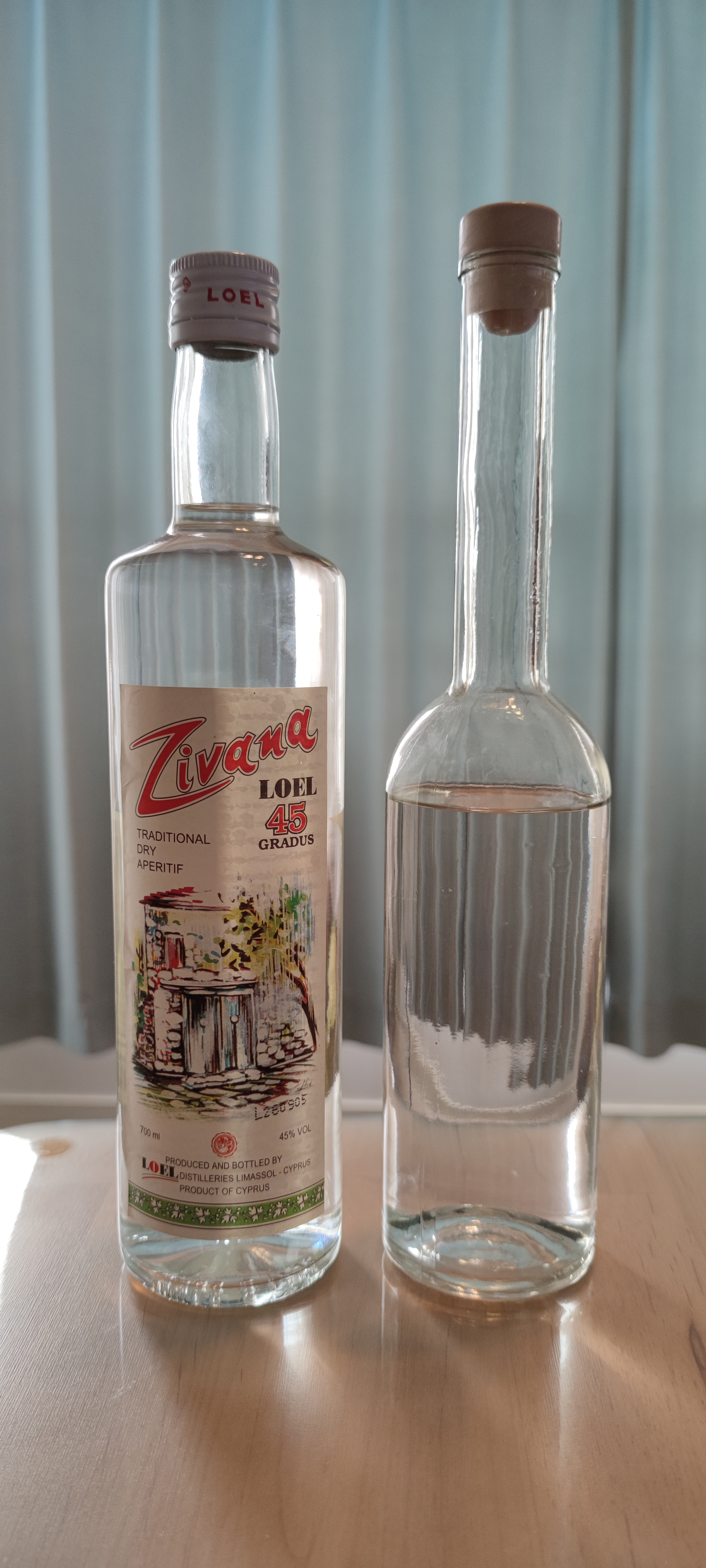
- Bottles of Cypriot Zivania.
- Type: pomace brandy
- Origin: Cyprus
- Alcohol by volume: 43-60%
- Colour: Clear, colourless
- Flavour: Alcoholic with a light aroma of raisins
- Ingredients: Grapes, pomace, dry wines
- Related products: Tsipouro, Tsikoudia, Rakia, Pisco, Grappa

Zivania or zivana (Greek: ζιβανία, ζιβάνα) is a Cypriot pomace brandy produced from the distillation of a mixture of grape pomace and local dry wines made from Xynisteri and Mavro grapes. The name of zivania is derived from zivana (Greek: ζίβανα) which means pomace in the Greek dialect of Cyprus. Zivania is colourless and alcoholic with a light aroma of raisins. Its alcohol content varies, with 45% by volume being typical. As defined by law, zivania cannot have more than 60% alcohol content. Zivania contains no sugar and has no acidity.

== History ==
It is unknown when zivania was first produced in Cyprus. Some believe that the method of producing zivania, which resembles that of producing tsipouro, was brought to Cyprus by monks of Mount Athos in the 15th century while others believe that zivania has been produced in Cyprus since the time the Republic of Venice ruled the island, around the end of the 15th century. Evidence of its continued production during Ottoman and British rule of the island comes from writers such as the British writer Samuel Baker who in 1879 reports: "...the refuse of skins and stalks is laid upon one side to ferment for the manufacture of raki, or spirit, by distillation...".

According to the Cyprus law regarding the regulation and control of grape products of 1965 (52/1965), zivania is defined as "an alcoholic drink containing no more than 60% alcohol by volume which is produced exclusively from the first distillation of wine, grapes and pomace that went through fermentation or raisins or any other remains of the same".

Since 1989, zivania has been protected under EU regulations as a name for grape marc produced in Cyprus.

== Production ==
Production starts with the pressing of mature grapes to produce must. The density of the grape must is checked with a Baumé hydrometer to ensure a value below 13° Baumé, necessary for complete fermentation. The grape must and pomace are then placed in large containers and left to ferment. Traditionally, the must-pomace mixture was placed in large clay containers (pithos, Greek: πιθάρι). As soon as the fermentation process has completed (i.e., the fermented must is checked and confirmed to have a value of less than or equal to 0° Baumé), the fermented must-pomace mixture is transferred to the main container of the still (kazani, Greek: καζάνι) for distillation.

The traditional zivania still is called lampikos (Greek: λαμπίκος, Greek pronunciation: [lamˈbikos]; see also alembic) in the Greek dialect of Cyprus. In some villages of Cyprus, a single lampikos was usually shared by all villagers. The traditional zivania stills are similar to those used for tsikoudia in Crete.

Once the main container of the still is hermetically sealed, a fire is lit beneath it. The fire is monitored and maintained in order to produce constant heat. The first zivania that comes from the still has the highest alcohol content, while the last taken out of the apparatus has a low alcohol content and is called porakos (Greek: πόρακος). The first zivania is typically discarded as it is not good for drinking because it contains harmful chemicals or is used for massaging sore body parts.

Depending on the pre-distillation mixture, different qualities of zivania are produced:

- Zivania produced using only wine for the distillation
- Zivania produced using wine and pomace for the distillation
- Zivania produced using pomace, water and weak zivania

== Storage and transportation ==
Zivania is usually stored in clean wooden or galvanised metal containers that can be sealed to prevent evaporation. It can be transferred to glass bottles for short storage or consumption.

== Consumption and other usage ==
Cypriots consume zivania throughout the year. During the summer, zivania is served ice cold. Zivania is not usually consumed alone; it is typically served with dried nuts, loukoumi, shoushouko, or small appetizers like Cypriot loukaniko, lountza, and tsamarella.

Before the introduction of beer and other alcoholic drinks in Cyprus, the main alcoholic drinks Cypriots consumed were wine and zivania. In some villages of Cyprus, cinnamon is added to zivania, giving it a distinct red colour, aroma and flavour. When left to age, it develops a stronger flavour and aroma and is often reserved for special occasions or served to visitors.

Beyond its use as a beverage, zivania is used to treat wounds, for massaging sore body parts, and as a folk remedy for colds and toothaches, particularly in the villages of the Troodos Mountains.

== Authenticity ==
To establish the authenticity of zivania, chemical studies were conducted to determine which of the analyzed metals serve as diagnostic parameters. The results of the studies establish that zivania is related to the unique geological and climatic conditions existing on the island of Cyprus.

== Photos ==
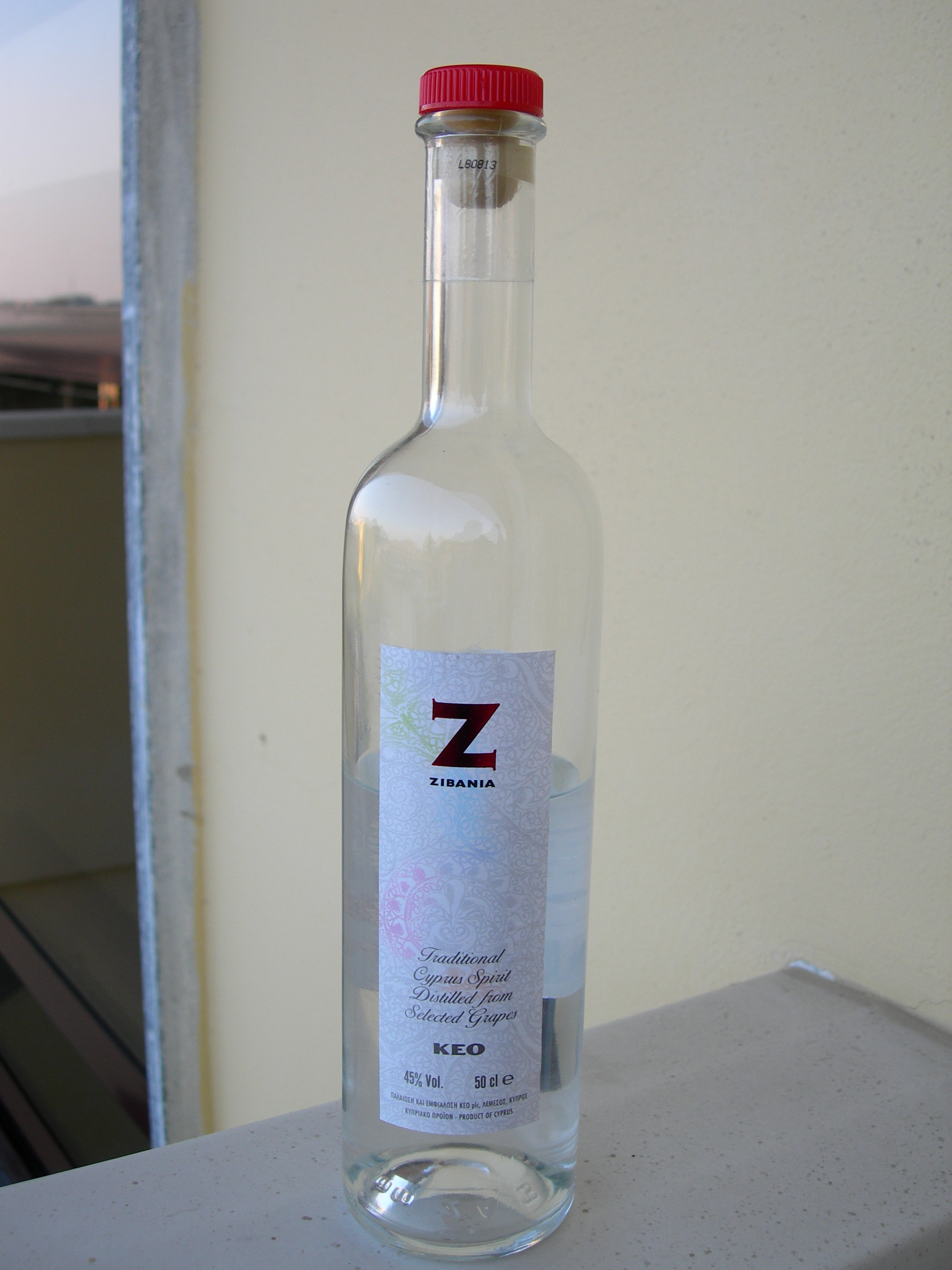
A bottle of Cypriot Zivania.

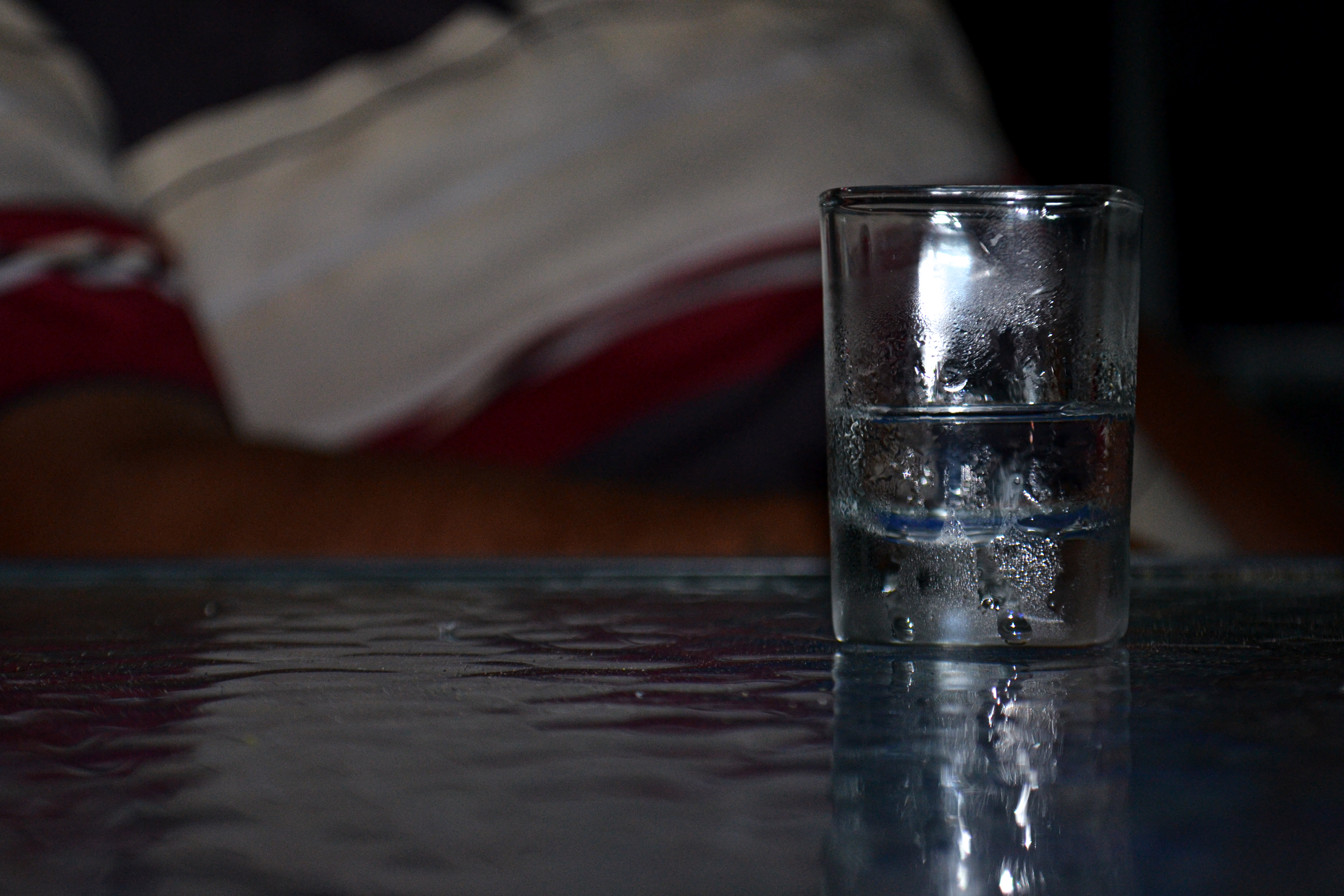
A glass of Cypriot Zivania.

Xynisteri grapes used to produce zivania.

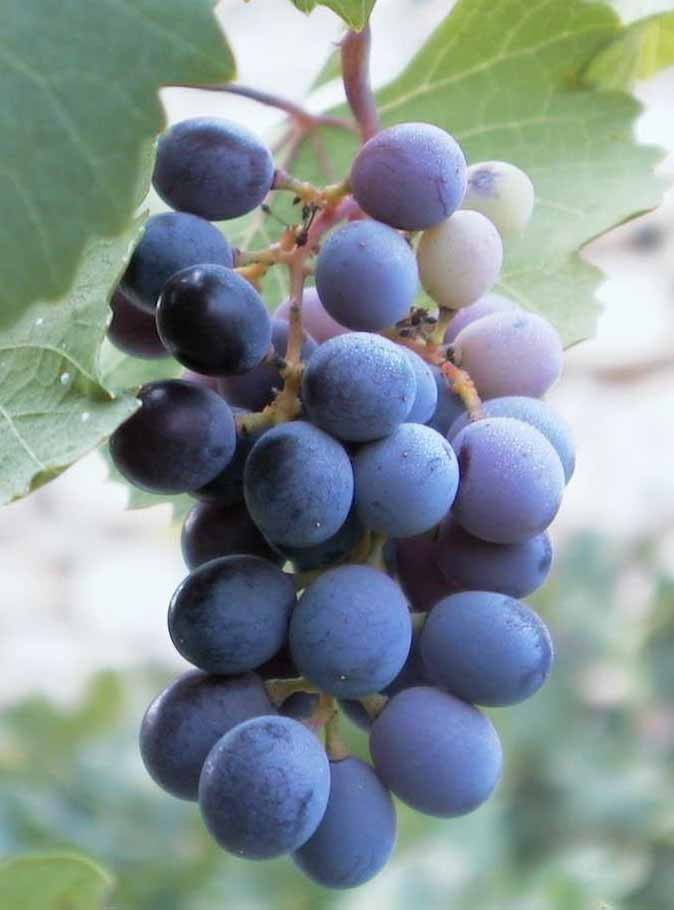
Mavro grapes used to produce zivania.

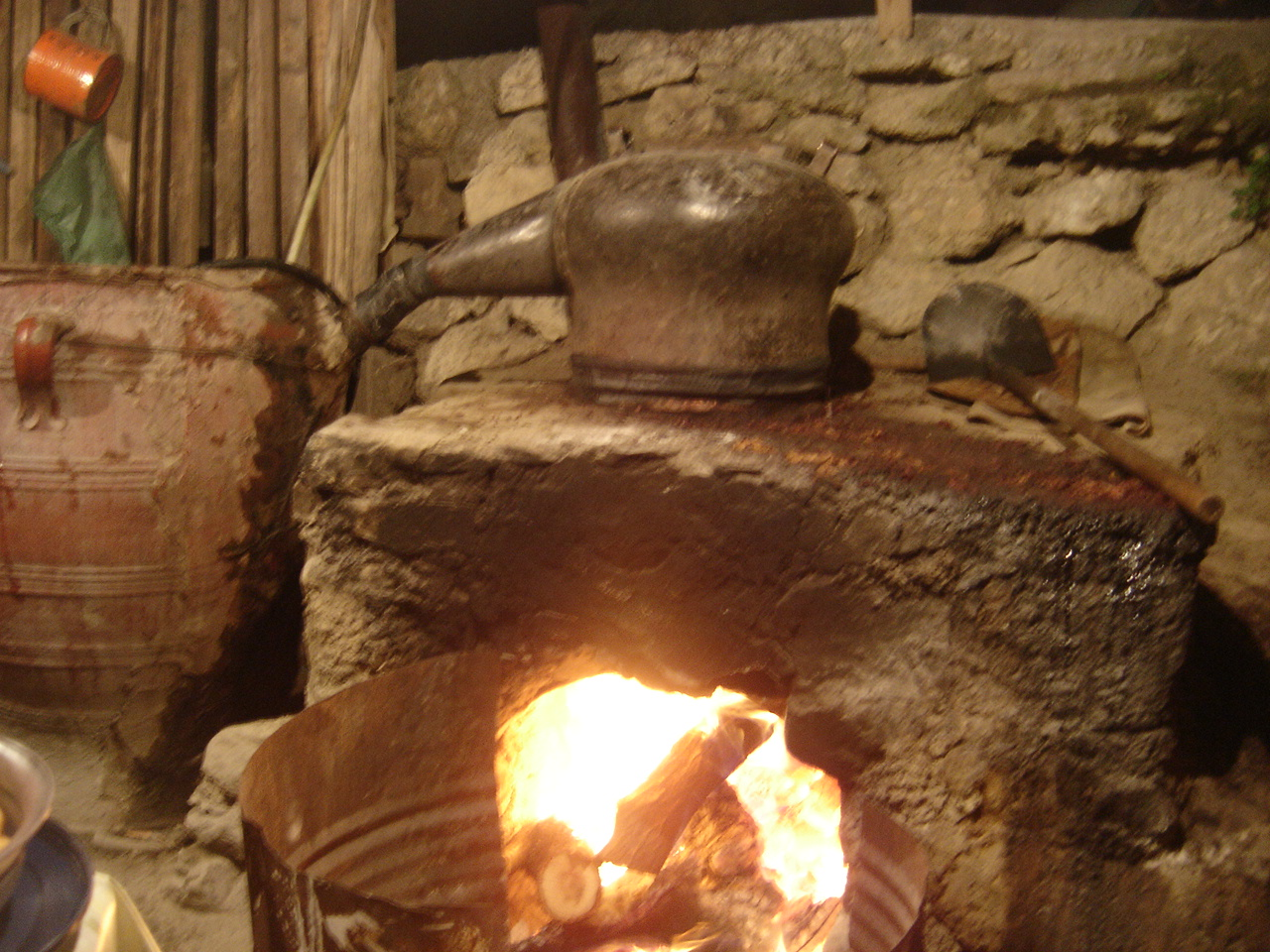
Distillation apparatus (kazani) found in the village of Amiras, Crete.

== See also ==
- Pomace brandy
- Tsipouro
- Tsikoudia
- Rakia
- Pisco
- Grappa
- Aguardiente
- Törkölypálinka
- Chacha (brandy)
- Orujo
