= Grappa =

Italian alcoholic beverage

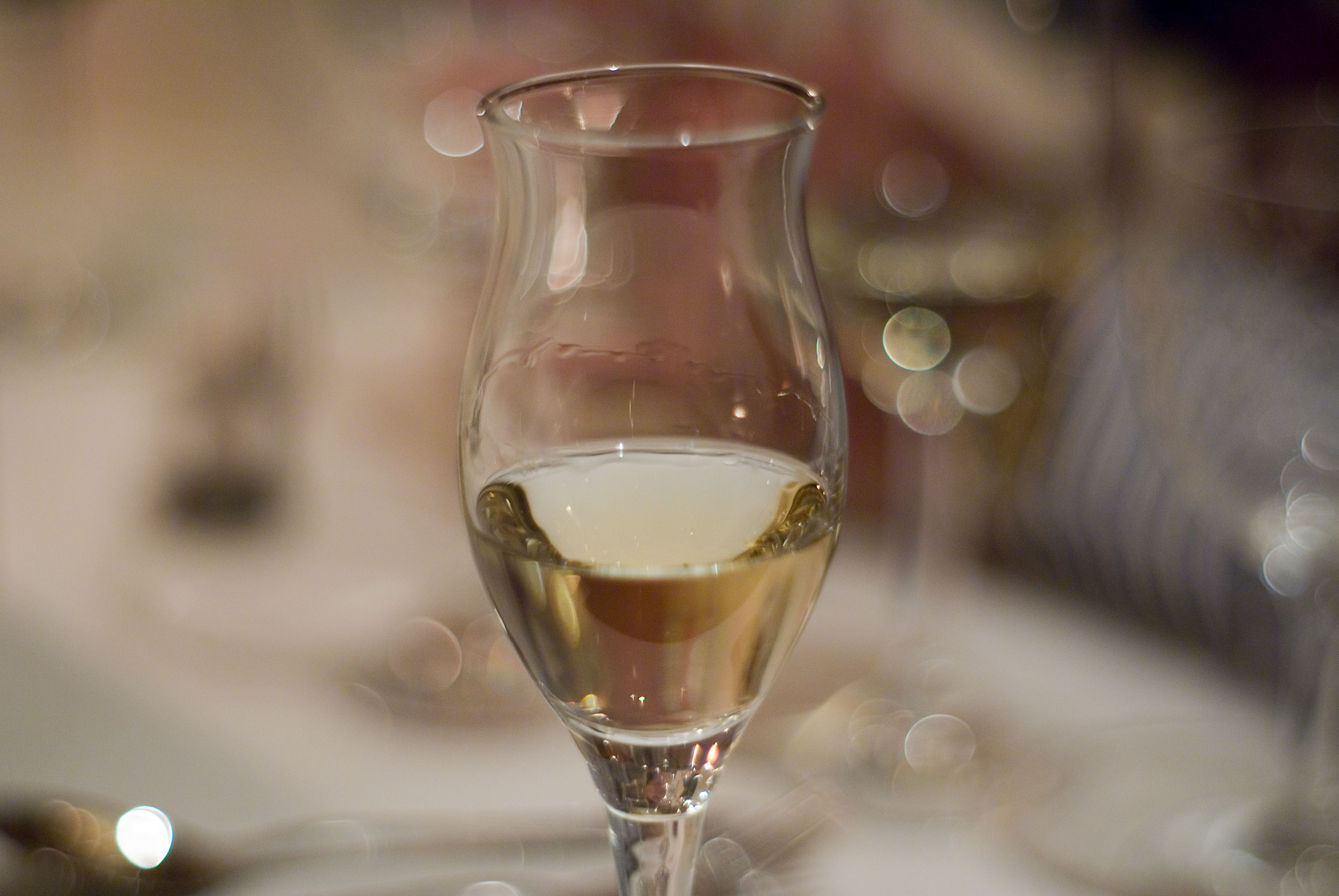
A glass of grappa

Grappa is an Italian alcoholic beverage, a fragrant, grape-based pomace brandy that contains 35 to 60 percent alcohol by volume (70 to 120 US proof). Grappa is a protected name in the European Union.

Grappa is made by distilling the skins, pulp, seeds, and stems (i.e., the pomace) left over from winemaking after pressing the grapes. It was originally made to prevent waste by using these leftovers. A similar drink, known as acquavite d'uva, is made by distilling whole must. The original date grappa was created cannot be determined, but was likely first made pre-1300s as distillation arrived in Italy during the Middle Ages.

In Italy, grappa is primarily served as a digestivo or after-dinner drink. Its main purpose is to aid in the digestion of heavy meals. Grappa may also be added to espresso coffee to create a caffè corretto, meaning "corrected" coffee. Another variation of this is the ammazzacaffè: the espresso is drunk first, followed by a few ounces of grappa served in its own glass. In Veneto, there is resentin: after finishing a cup of espresso with sugar, a few drops of grappa are poured into the nearly empty cup, swirled and drunk down in one sip.

Noted producers of grappa include Jacopo Poli, Nardini, and Nonino. These grappas are produced in significant quantities and are exported; there are also many small local or regional grappas.

Most grappa is clear, indicating it is an unaged distillate, although some may retain very faint pigments from their original fruit pomace. Today, aged grappas have become more common, and these take on a yellow or red-brown hue from the barrels in which they are stored.

Grappa is also well known in Uruguay and Argentina, due to the significant Italian immigration in those countries. It is served as in Italy, after the main meals. In Uruguay, a local version called grappamiel has also been created, which sees honey added to the traditional grappa. It is widely served and mostly drunk in winter because it "warms" the throat.

== History ==
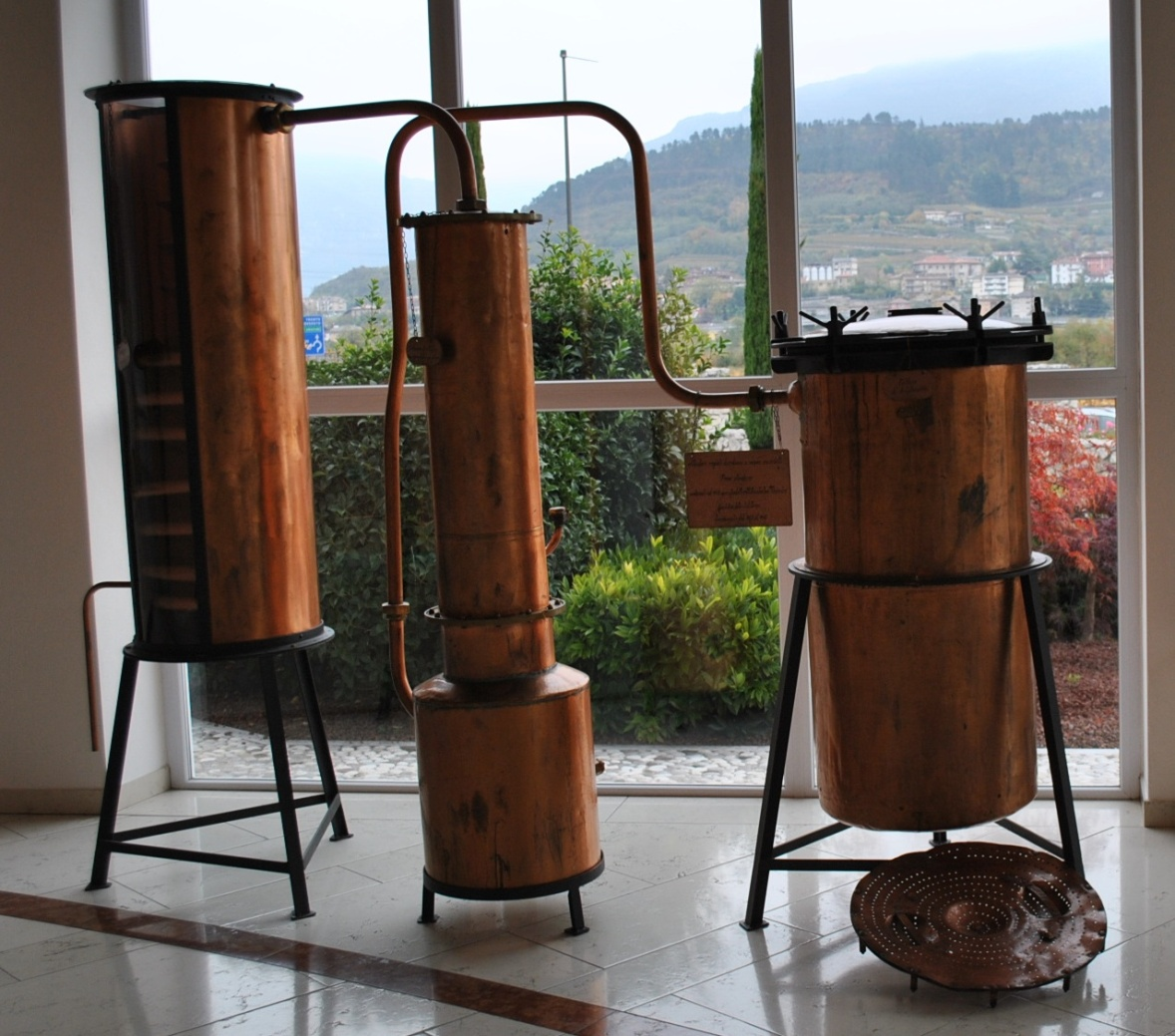
Retort for continuous steam distillation dating from around 1960

Distillation is an ancient practice that can be traced back to the 1st century AD. The distillation of alcohol may have been carried out reliably by al-Kindī (c. 801–873), al-Fārābī (c. 872–950), and al-Zahrāwī (Latin: Abulcasis, 936–1013), as well as by the School of Salerno in the 12th century.

Grappa is traditionally produced in northern Italy and is also widely consumed in places such as Argentina, Bulgaria, Georgia (chacha), Uruguay, Galicia (orujo or aguardiente in Spanish), and Portugal (known as bagaço or bagaceira).

There is a legend that tells of a Roman soldier who first distilled grappa in the northern Italian town of Bassano del Grappa using distilling equipment stolen in Egypt ("Crisiopea di Cleopatra", 2nd century AD). However, the story cannot be considered reliable as such equipment could not produce grappa. Distillation useful for producing beverages was not discovered until the 8th century, and it probably took about two more centuries for the technology to travel from its home in the Levant and Persia to Italy (likely by route of the Crusades).

Around 1300–1400 AD, however, the introduction of water as a coolant in the distilling equipment made it possible to produce a substantially larger amount of distilled wine and to distill pomace. Around 1600 AD, the Jesuits in Spain, Italy, and Germany studied and codified the techniques used to produce brandy or grappa, and their methods were used until recent times. The Museum of Wine and Grappa shows historical equipment used in the early years of grappa distillation.

The modernisation of grappa distillation is relatively recent, probably in 1979 in northern Italy. Initially it was carried out by direct flame but soon the advantages of a bain-marie or steam distillation to obtain a better product became obvious. Modern refinements included the distillation of pomace under vacuum, the use of varietal grapes and ageing in casks of various types of wood to improve the flavor of the liquor. Oak is the most used, but some more expensive grappas are aged successively in casks of acacia, ash, and cherry-wood, an innovation introduced by the Marzadro Distillery. In Sardinia, Grappa is colloquially known as Filu è Ferru (iron wire), as most of the distillation was illegally home-made to avoid customs and excise taxes. The illegally distilled liquor was bottled, sealed and then buried in orchards, fields, and pastures, awaiting sale. A bit of iron wire was tied around the bottleneck, barely protruding through the soil; after some time the wire would rust and disappear completely save for a faintly brown-red stain to the topsoil on the spot where the bottle was buried. While the peasant distiller could easily recognize the colored spot, the urban-schooled Guardia di Finanza officers were generally unable to tell the difference.

== PGI status ==
Grappa is a protected name (PGI) in the European Union. To be called grappa, the following criteria must be met:

1. Produced in Italy
2. Produced from pomace
3. Fermentation and distillation must occur on the pomace—no added water

Criterion 2 rules out the direct fermentation of pure grape juice, which is the method used to produce brandy.

Criterion 3 has two important implications. First, the distillation must occur on solids. Thus, it is carried out not with a direct flame but with a bain-marie or steam distillation; otherwise, the pomace may burn. Second, the woody parts of the grapes (the stems and seeds) are co-fermented with the sugar-rich juice; this produces a very small amount of methanol, which is much more toxic than ethanol. Unlike in the similar process of making red wine, in grappa the methanol must be carefully removed during distillation. That is why there is an Italian law requiring winemakers to sell their pomace to grappa makers; this is a measure that was taken against moonshine operations, which are now very rare in Italy.

Use of the word grappa for product distilled in the United States is still allowed and falls under the Class definition of brandy further classified type as pomace, specifically grappa or grappa brandy.

== Tasting ==
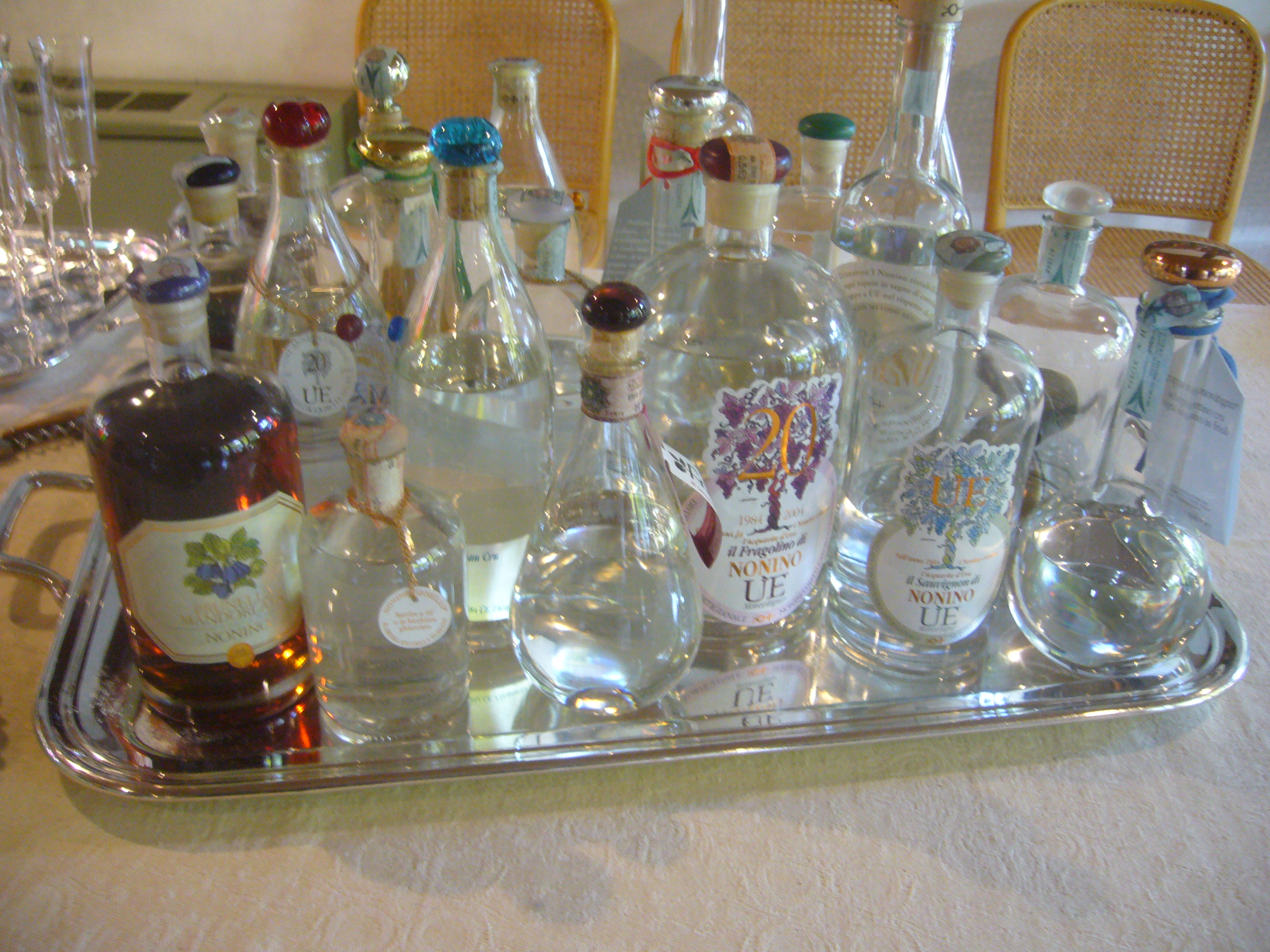
A selection of grappas

Professional tasters distinguish among four categories of grappa: young, cask-conditioned, aromatic, and aromatized. Grappa tastings begin with young grappas, then continue with cask-conditioned and aromatic grappas, and finish with aromatized grappas.

The flavor of grappa, like that of wine, depends on the type and quality of the grapes used, as well as the specifics of the distillation process.

Some tasters recommend drinking half a glass of milk in between tastings, before and after each glass, to refresh the taste receptors on the tongue.

Various other food products can help stop taste-characteristics of one grappa from "dragging" or carrying over to the next. Foods that are effective in this role as well as providing an agreeable accompaniment to grappa's own flavor include:

- Salted pistachio nuts

With the introduction of "boutique" grappas, elaborate flute glasses have been promoted; traditionalists continue to taste grappa in shot glasses.

== See also ==
- List of geographical designations for spirit drinks in the European Union
- Aguardiente: Chile
- Aragh: Persia
- Bagaceira: Portugal
- Chacha: Georgia
- Filu 'e ferru: Sardinia
- Loza or rakija: Croatia, Bosnia-Herzegovina, Montenegro, and Serbia
- Marc: France
- Oghi: Armenia
- Orujo: Spain
- Pisco: Peru
- Lozova rakija (Лозова ракија) in North Macedonia
- Rachiu de tescovină: Romania
- Rakia (Pакия): Bulgaria
- Törkölypálinka: Hungary
- Tresterbrand: Germany
- Tsipouro: Greece
- Zivania: Cyprus
