= Trnavac, Serbia =

Coordinates: 44.7533°N 15.5643°E

Trnavac
- Interactive map of Trnavac
- Country: Serbia
- Time zone: UTC+1 (CET)
  - Summer (DST): UTC+2 (CEST)

Trnavac is a small village in Serbia situated in the municipality of Zajecar, in the Timok Valley, eastern Serbia.

== Background ==
The village is located in the valley, on the banks of the Timok River. The village has a population of around 300 people. As of 2009, most of the Trnavac population is older than 60 years. Trnavac and the nearby villages of Rgotina and Vrazogrnac were founded in the 17th century, during the first great Serb migration from the Prizren district, Kosovo. The village is known for its vineyards and fine homemade wines and grape pomace rakia (komovica).
