= Protected Geographical Indications for Georgian products =

Georgian protected geographic appellation

The country of Georgia is the first among the EU neighbourhood countries to take an important step towards protecting its local food and beverages from being copied in other countries. The country has a rich history of local and specialist agricultural production and has long been famed for its wines. Names of as many as 18 premium quality local wines have been protected by the use of appellation system, the appellations usually being the geographical name of the area in which the wine is produced.

While the appellation system is associated particularly with wine, the geographical indication is a type of intellectual property right which indicates a geographical area and is used to designate the goods originating in that geographical area, specific quality, reputation, or other characteristics of which are attributable to that geographical area and production or processing or preparation of which takes place in the geographical area. The list of products with names protected under the appellation system was later expanded by mineral waters and currently as many as 37 products including local sorts of cheese, dairy, sweets and spirits have been registered as appellations of origins and geographical indications in Georgia.

== History ==
The 19th-century Russian poet, Alexander Pushkin once commented that "Every Georgian dish is a poem." In this regard, Georgia is among many European countries and regions having a history of local and specialist agricultural production. In the result of the Agreement on Trade-Related Aspects of Intellectual Property Rights (TRIPS), administered by the World Trade Organization, having recognized the protection of geographical indications for agricultural products, geographical indications of origin are for the first time afforded international protection as a separate branch of intellectual property. It serves to protect authentic products, and eliminate the unfair competition and misleading of consumers as to the true place of origin. After almost two decades of its existence as a sovereign state, Georgia goes ahead with the protection of its intellectual property. Protection of this property is of urgent importance as far as distinguished Georgian brands of wine, mineral water, or other food products are frequently misappropriated, especially within the post-soviet zone including Commonwealth of Independent States (CIS) and Eastern Europe. Moreover, registration of the entire intellectual property of Georgia is essential to be competitive at the international market as well as to promote quality in the food chain and stimulate value in sustainable rural development. A reflection of the views of Georgia on matters like consumer protection and intellectual property is a bilateral agreement signed between the European Union and Georgia on 14 July 2011 for the protection of their respective "Geographical Indications". The agreement will contribute to the boost of trade between the EU and Georgia. Currently, around 3000 agriculture products have been registered for protection in the EU and, based on the agreement, 18 Georgian wines will be added to the list. Through this agreement, Georgia is harmonizing its legislation with the international standards on the Appellations of Origin and Geographical Indications of Goods.

== The products protected with Geographical Indications ==
National Intellectual Property Center of Georgia in cooperation with Ministry of Agriculture of Georgia (MOA) has now registered as many as 37 varieties of local products under a law of Georgia On Appellations of Origin and Geographical Indications of Goods. This includes the Geographical Indications of:

- Cheese

- Chogi
- Tenili
- Kartuli Kveli
- Acharuli Chlechili
- Meskhuri Chechili
- Megruli Sulguni
- Sulguni
- Svanuri Sulguni
- Kobi
- Guda
- Tushuri Guda
- Imeruli Kveli

- Spirit

- Chacha

- Candy

- Churchkhela

- Dairy products

- Matsoni
- Dambalkhacho
