= Oghi (drink) =

Armenian distilled fruit spirit

Oghi (sometimes oghee, Armenian: օղի òġi; colloquially aragh) is an Armenian spirit distilled from fruits or berries. It is widely produced as moonshine from home-grown garden fruits all across Armenia, where it is served as a popular welcome drink to guests and is routinely drunk during meals. Arguably, Armenian oghi is not "vodka" at all (see Vodka war) and merely became thought of as such during the Soviet era in Armenia. Mulberry oghi is commercially produced and exported under the brand name Artsakh by the Artsakh-Alco Brandy Company in Askeran District in the Republic of Artsakh.

== Varieties ==
- Tuti oghi – mulberry oghi (commercial brand name Artsakh, from Nagorno-Karabakh)
- Honi oghi – from hon, a small red berry (cornelian cherry)
- Tsirani oghi – from apricots
- Tandzi oghi – from pears
- Khaghoghi oghi – from grapes
- Salori oghi – from plums
- Moshi oghi – from blackberry
- Tzi oghi – from figs
- Khundzori oghi – from apples

== Oghi in the Armenian Diaspora ==
In the Armenian Diaspora, oghi refers to the aniseed-flavored distilled alcoholic drink called arak in the Middle East, rakı in Turkey, or ouzo in Greece. In the Prohibition-Era United States, Armenians produced bootleg Oghi from raisins and flavored it with anise. In the old country of Western Armenia, the oghi was often made from grape pomace, or from mulberries, and was sometimes flavored with anise, mastic, or even cardamom or orange peel, as well as other herbs or spices. In the region of Kharpert as well as nearby Chnkoosh, oghi was usually made from mulberries.

== See also ==
- Chacha, a Georgian pomace brandy, sometimes called "Georgian vodka"
- Pálinka, a Hungarian distilled liquor also derived from fruits or nuts
- Rakia, fruit spirits of the Balkans
- Flavoured liquor, which includes flavoured vodkas
- Baijiu, a Chinese distilled liquor sometimes called "Chinese vodka"
- Shōchū, sometimes called "Japanese vodka"
- Soju, a Korean distilled drink, sometimes called "Korean vodka"
