= Tsikoudia =

Distilled spirit from Crete

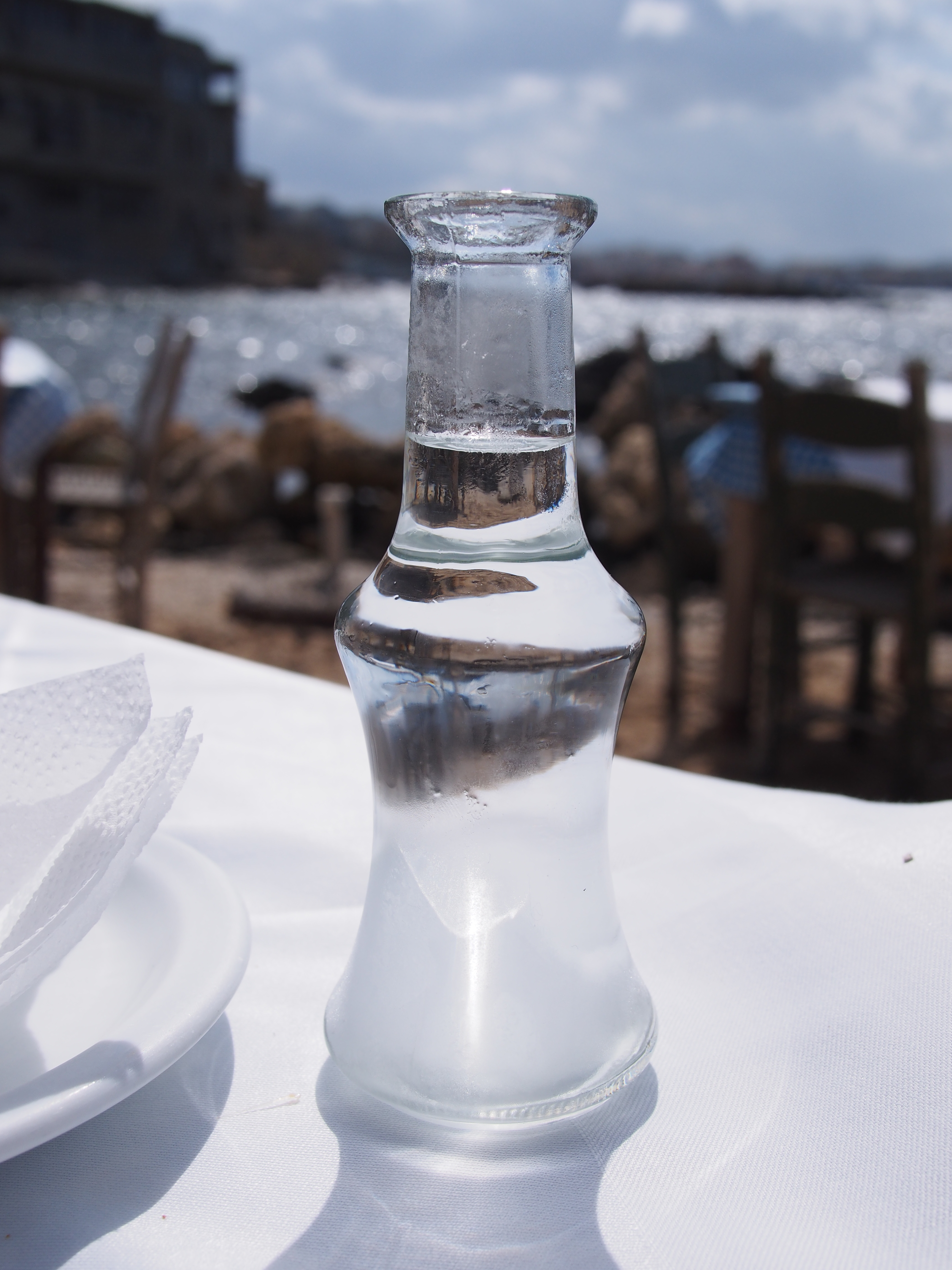
A bottle of tsikoudia

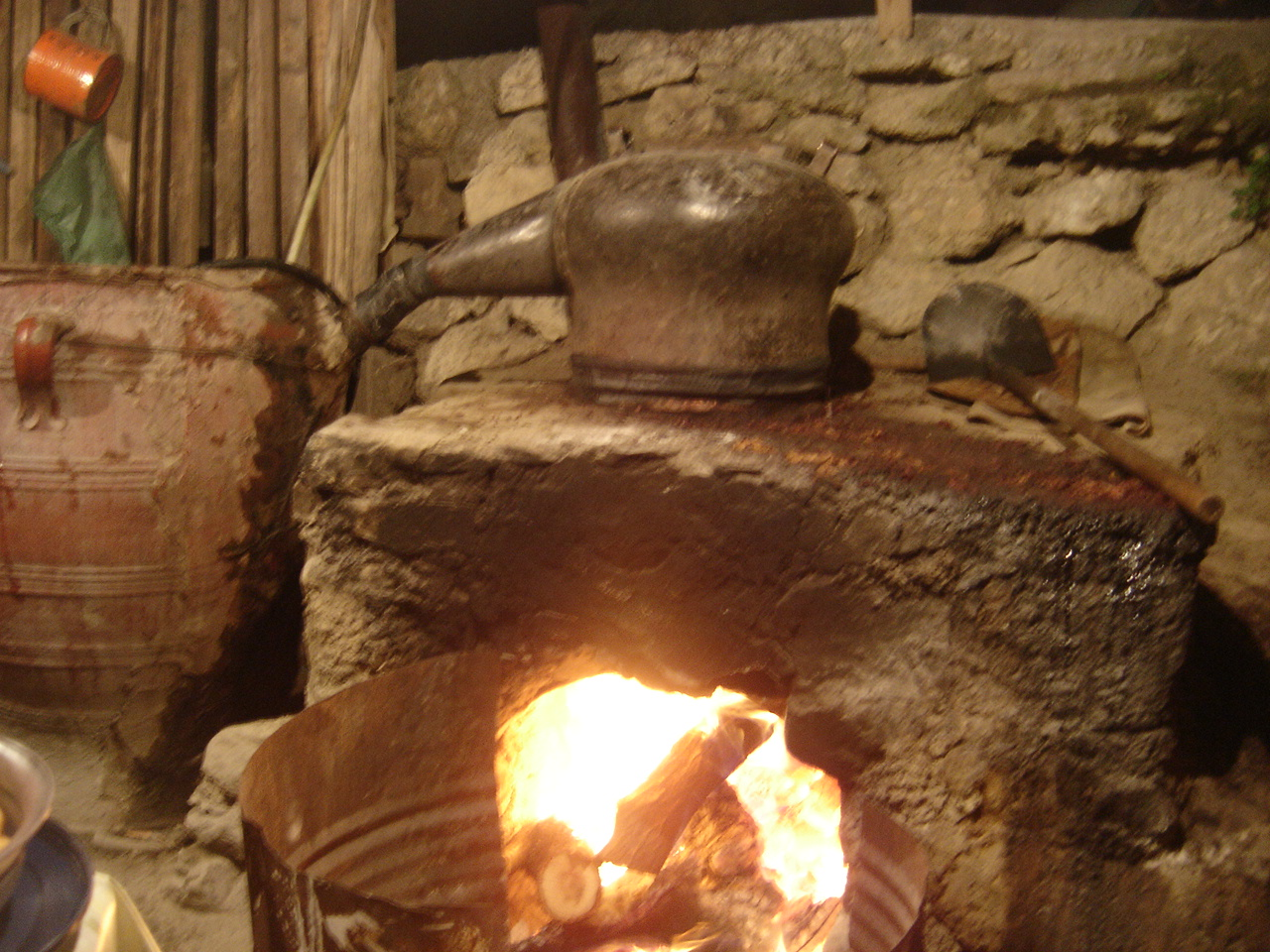
Traditional distillation of tsikoudia

Tsikoudia (Greek: τσικουδιά, romanized: tsikoudiá, literally "terebinth") is an alcoholic beverage, a fragrant, grape-based pomace brandy of Cretan origin that contains 40% to 65% alcohol by volume. Tsikoudia is made by distilling of pomace, what remains of grapes pressed in winemaking. In the eastern part of Crete, tsikoudia is often informally called raki (Greek: ρακή, romanized: rakí), a name originating from the Turkish 'raki', derived from the 17th-century Arabic 'arak', meaning 'distilled'.

The pomace ferments for about six weeks in a tightly sealed barrel, and is then distilled. It is similar to tsipouro from mainland Greece, and is part of a family of Mediterranean grape-based distilled spirits, including Spanish: orujo, Italian: grappa, French: marc, Georgian: chacha, Portuguese: bagaceira, Bulgarian: ракия, romanized: rakiya, Macedonian: ракија, romanized: rakija, Turkish rakı, Albanian: rakia, Serbo-Croatian: rakija / ракија (in Istria: grappa), Romanian: tescovină, Hungarian: törköly. However, unlike the above spirits which are typically double-distilled and often include additional spices such as anise, tsikoudia undergoes a single distillation process. This method preserves more of the original grape flavor without the addition of flavorings, resulting in a lower alcohol content and a distinct flavor profile compared to its counterparts.

It is often produced at home in villages throughout Crete, thus the alcohol content varies by producer. Typically each Cretan village has one or two residents who are licensed to distill, and tsikoudia is produced continuously for two to three weeks in late October and early November.

Tsikoudia is almost always served chilled from a freezer and is commonly provided as a complimentary digestif in Cretan restaurants, often accompanied by fruits and sweets after the meal.
