= Queimada (drink) =

Galician distilled drink, alcoholic beverage

Queimada is an alcoholic beverage of Galician tradition.

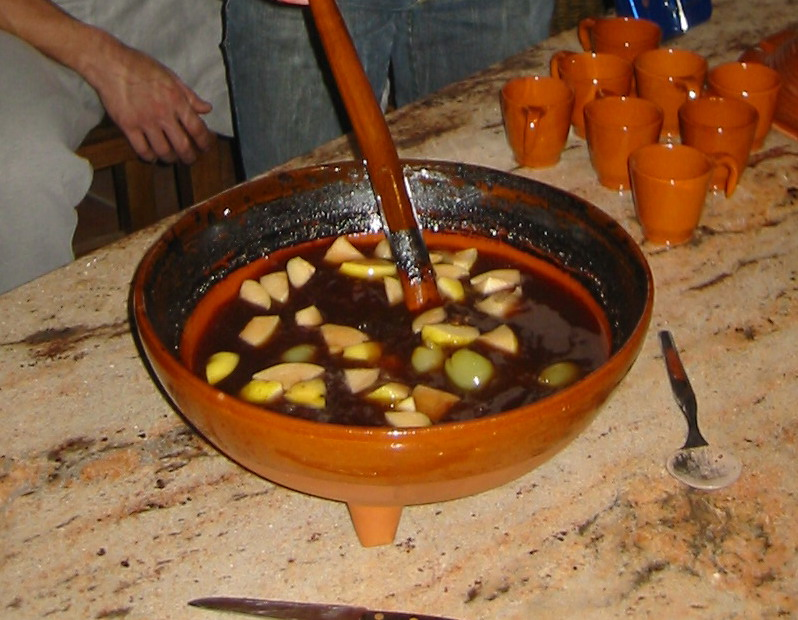
Queimada in preparation process.

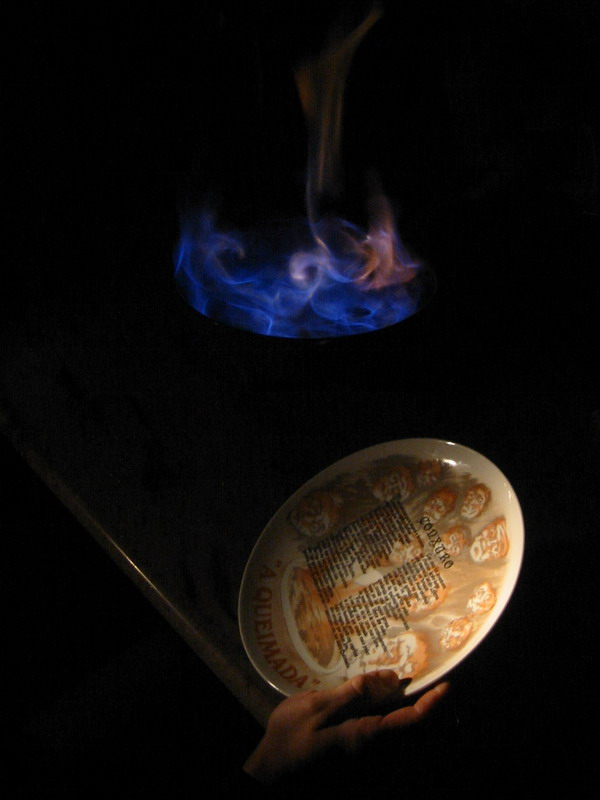
Spell.

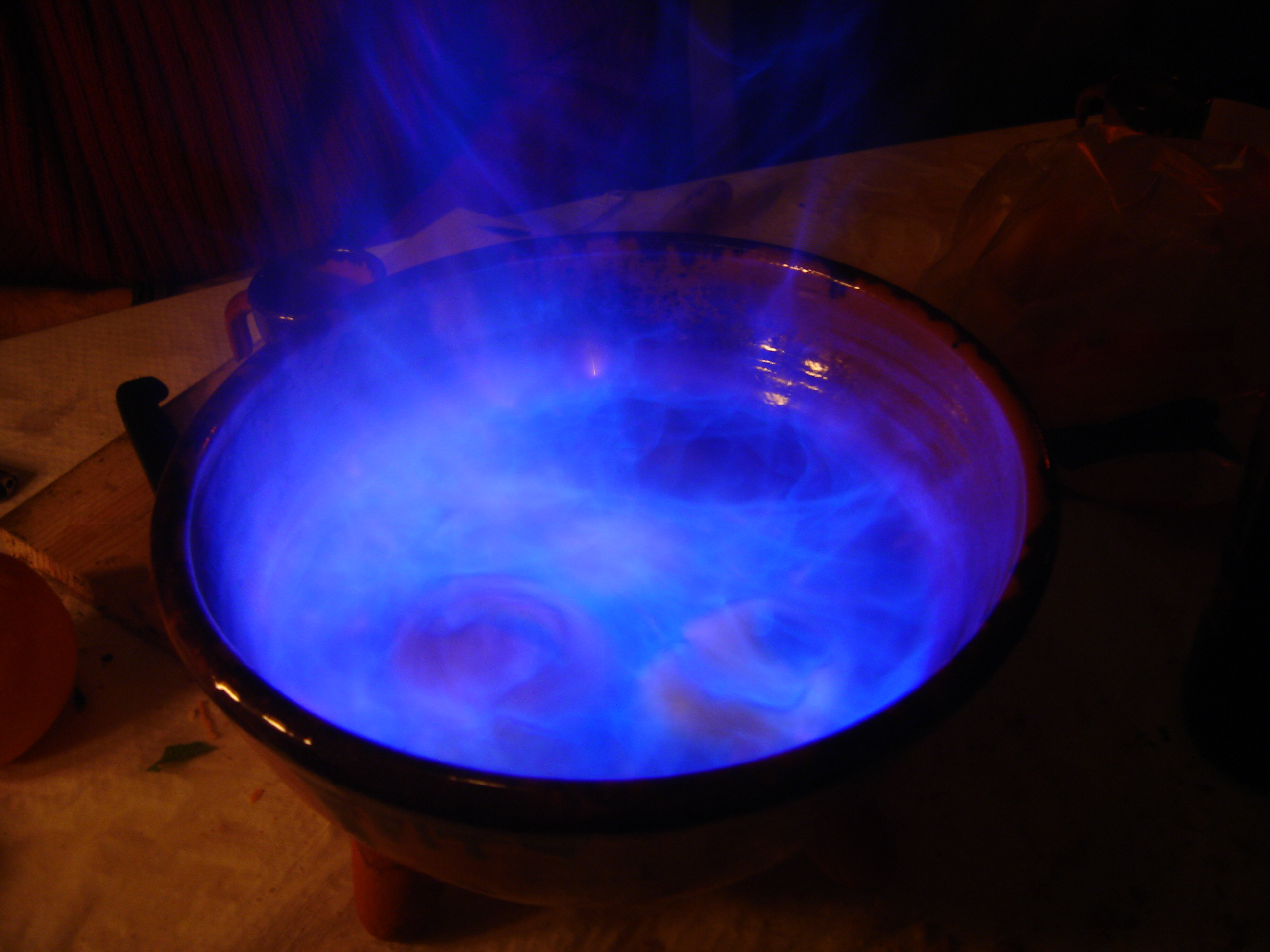
Queimada's characteristic blue fire.

Queimada is a punch made from Galician aguardente (orujo from Galicia) —a spirit distilled from the byproducts of winemaking— and made with sugar, lemon or orange peel, and coffee beans. Variations of queimada may include cinnamon or apples. It is traditionally prepared in a hollowed-out pumpkin or a ceramic or clay pot.

Typically, while preparing the punch a spell or incantation is recited, so that special powers are conferred to the queimada and those drinking it. Then the queimada is set alight, and slowly burns as more brandy is added.

== Origins ==
Queimada has origins in the Celtic pagan festivals of Galicia. Other aspects of Spain's history that influence the drink include the Arabs and Moors, and the Spanish colonies in South America.

== Tradition ==
The goal of the preparation ritual is to distance the bad spirits that, according with the tradition, lie in wait for men and women to try to curse them. All occasions are good for a queimada: a party, familiar meetings or gatherings of friends. After dinner, in the darkness of night, is one of the best times for it. The queimada ritual takes place during Saint John's Eve, called "witches' night", on June 23.

The participants gather around the container, ideally in darkness, to lift their spirits and become better friends. One of them ends the process of making the queimada while reciting the spell, holding up the burning liquid in a ladle and pouring it slowly back into the container.

== Spell ==
In Galician language

Mouchos, curuxas, sapos e bruxas.

Demos, trasgos e diaños,

espíritos das neboadas veigas.

Corvos, píntegas e meigas:

feitizos das menciñeiras.

Podres cañotas furadas,

fogar dos vermes e alimañas.

Lume das Santas Compañas,

mal de ollo, negros meigallos,

cheiro dos mortos, tronos e raios.

Ouveo do can, pregón da morte;

fuciño do sátiro e pé do coello.

Pecadora lingua da mala muller

casada cun home vello.

Averno de Satán e Belcebú,

lume dos cadáveres ardentes,

corpos mutilados dos indecentes,

peidos dos infernais cus,

muxido da mar embravecida.

Barriga inútil da muller solteira,

falar dos gatos que andan á xaneira,

guedella porca da cabra mal parida.

Con este fol levantarei

as chamas deste lume

que asemella ao do Inferno,

e fuxirán as bruxas

a cabalo das súas vasoiras,

índose bañar na praia

das areas gordas.

¡Oíde, oíde! os ruxidos

que dan as que non poden

deixar de queimarse no augardente

quedando así purificadas.

E cando este beberaxe

baixe polas nosas gorxas,

quedaremos libres dos males

da nosa alma e de todo embruxamento.

Forzas do ar, terra, mar e lume,

a vós fago esta chamada:

se é verdade que tendes máis poder

que a humana xente,

eiquí e agora, facede que os espíritos

dos amigos que están fóra,

participen con nós desta Queimada.

In English

Owls, barn owls, toads and witches.

Demons, goblins and devils,

spirits of the misty vales.

Crows, salamanders and witches,

charms of the folk healer(ess).

Rotten pierced canes,

home of worms and vermin.

Wisps of the Holy Company,

evil eye, black witchcraft,

scent of the dead, thunder and lightning.

Howl of the dog, omen of death,

maws of the satyr and foot of the rabbit.

Sinful tongue of the bad woman

married to an old man.

Satan and Beelzebub's Inferno,

fire of the burning corpses,

mutilated bodies of the indecent ones,

farts of the asses of doom,

bellow of the enraged sea.

Useless belly of the unmarried woman,

speech of the cats in heat,

dirty turf of the wicked born goat.

With this bellows I will pump

the flames of this fire

which looks like that from Hell,

and witches will flee,

straddling their brooms,

going to bathe in the beach

of the thick sands.

Hear! Hear the roars

of those that cannot

stop burning in the firewater,

becoming so purified.

And when this beverage

goes down our throats,

we will get free of the evil

of our soul and of any charm.

Forces of air, earth, sea and fire,

to you I make this call:

if it's true that you have more power

than people,

here and now, make the spirits

of the friends who are outside,

take part with us in this Queimada.
