= Pomace brandy =

Liquor distilled from pomace that is left over from winemaking

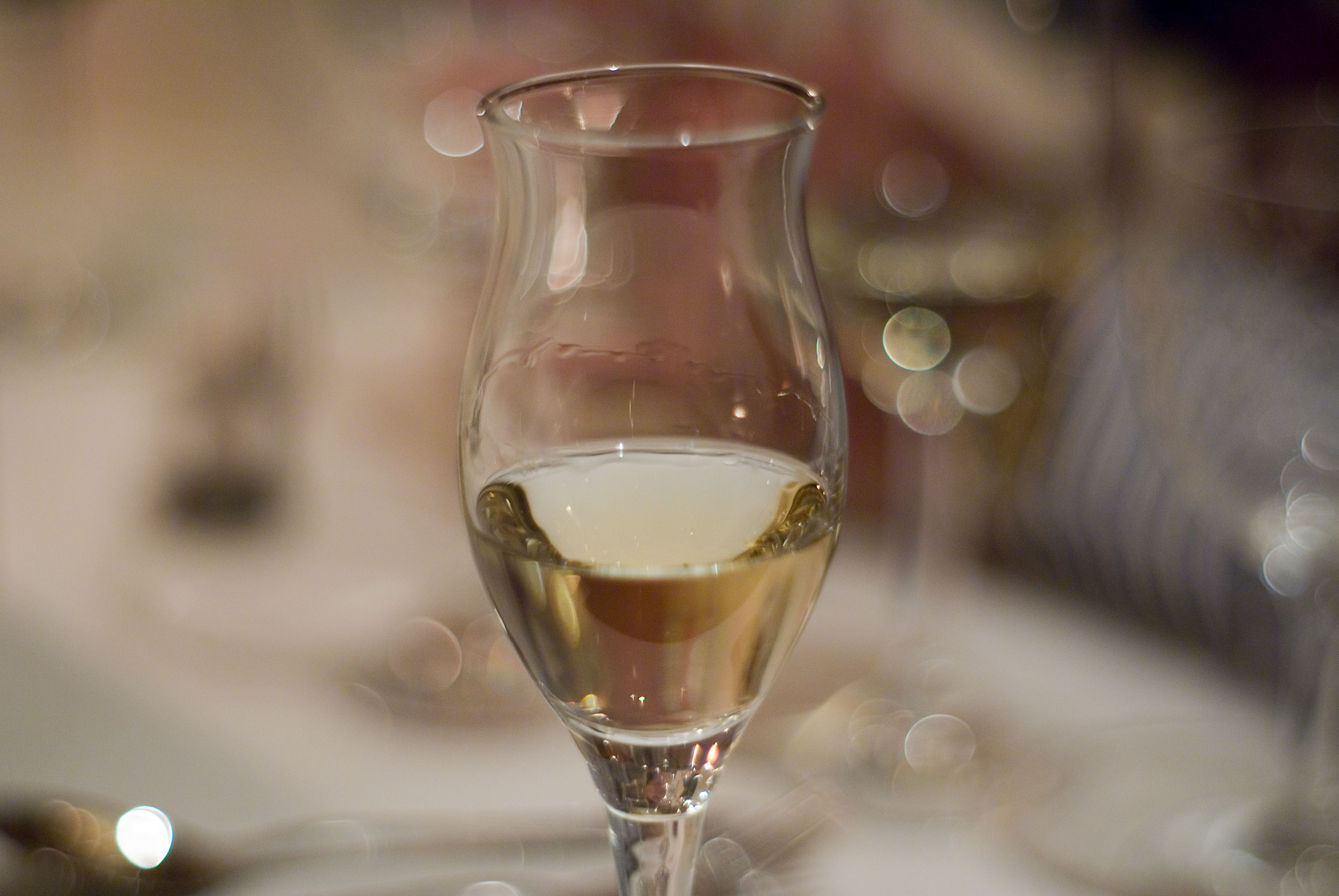
Grappa, an example of a brandy made from grape pomace

Pomace spirit (or pomace brandy) is a liquor distilled from pomace that is left over from winemaking, after the grapes are pressed. It is called marc in both English and French, "grappa" in Italian, "tsipouro" in Greek and "bagaço" in Portuguese. In Spanish it is called orujo or aguardiente. Alcohol derived from pomace is also used as the traditional base spirit of other liquors, such as some anise-flavored spirits. Unlike wine brandy, most pomace brandies are neither aged nor coloured.

== Production ==
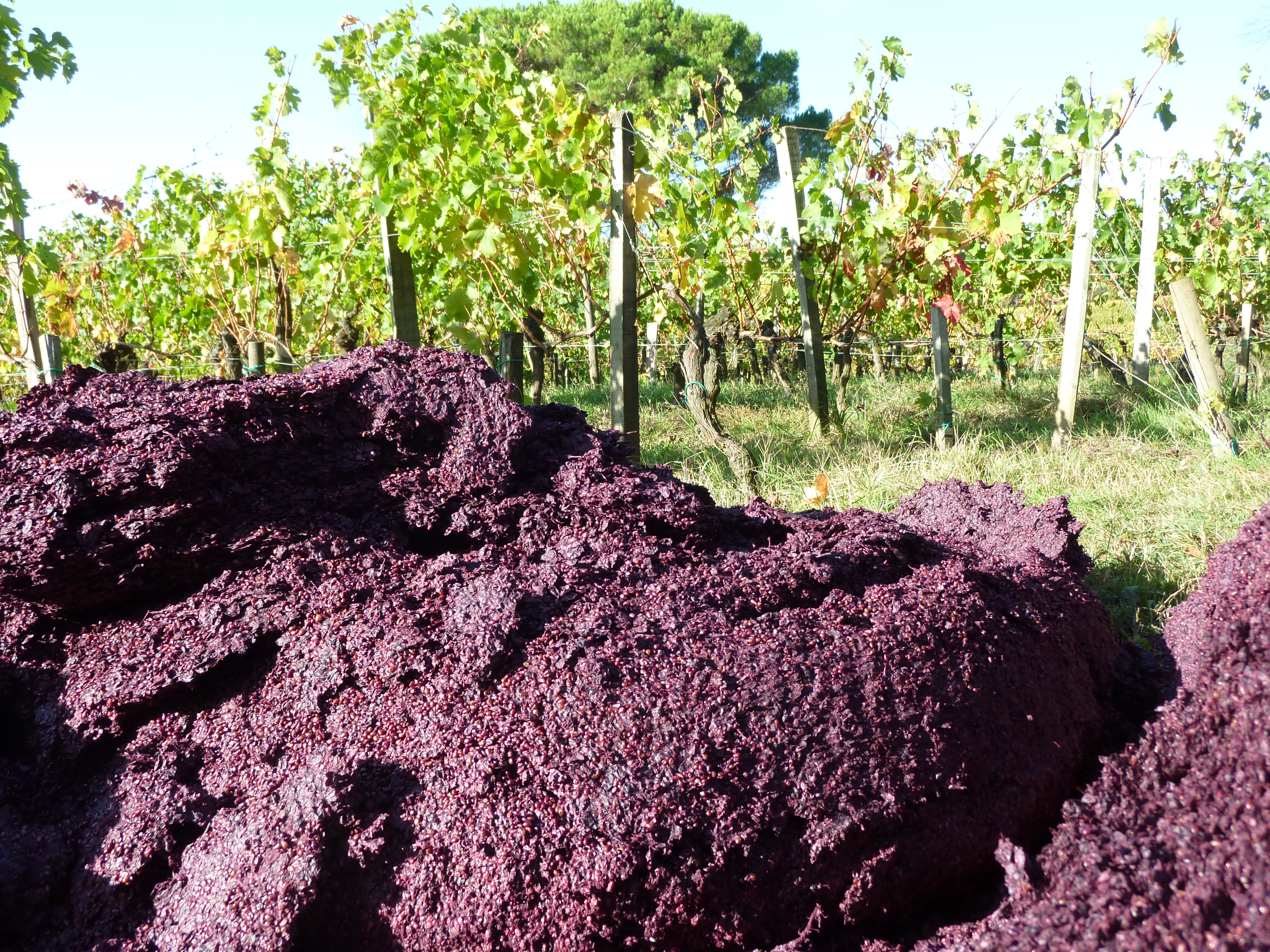
Red grape pomace in a vineyard

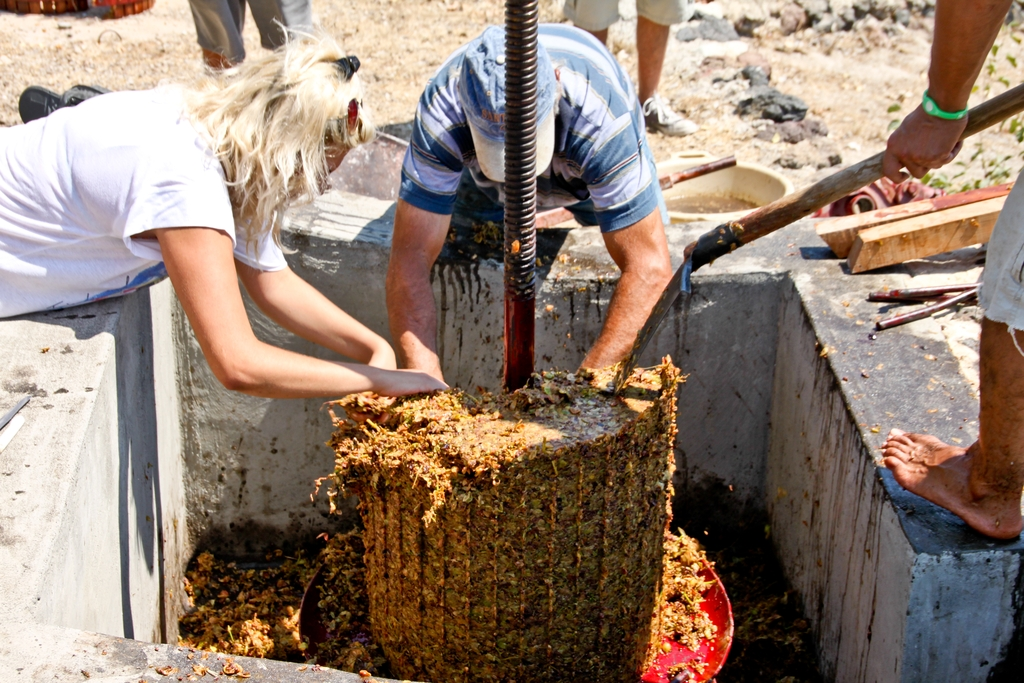
White grape pomace being removed from a basket press

Pomace may be either fermented, semi-fermented, or unfermented. During red wine vinification, the pomace is left to soak in the must for the entire fermentation period and is thus fermented; fermented pomace is particularly suitable for the production of pomace brandy, as it is soft, dry, and has a high alcohol content. Semi-fermented pomace is produced during rosé wine vinification; the pomace is removed before fermentation is complete. Virgin pomace, which is produced during white wine vinification, is not fermented at all.

The pomace is then fermented to completion and the alcohol is then distilled off to produce the pomace brandy.

== Varieties ==
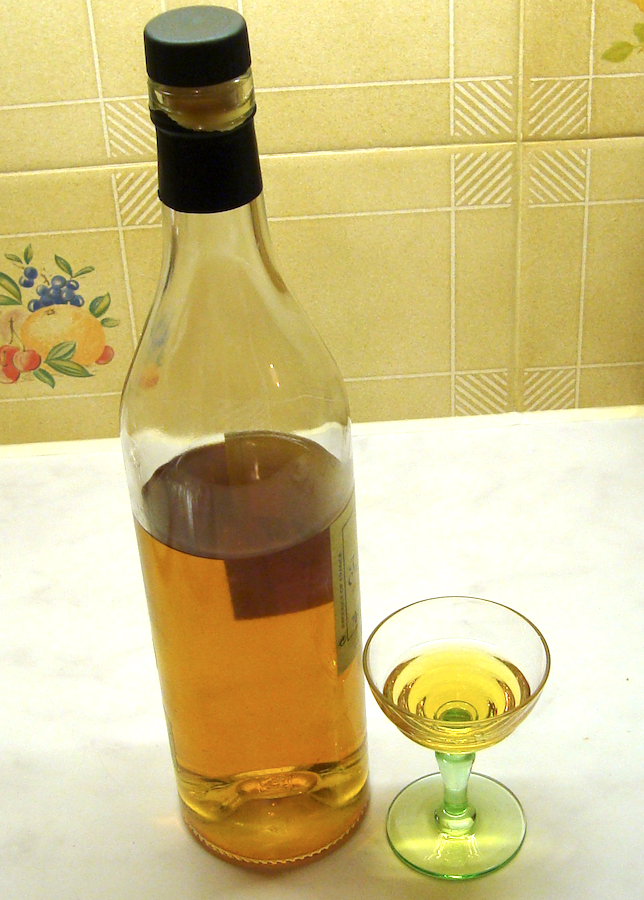
Marc de Bourgogne (a type of aged pomace brandy from Burgundy, France)

=== France ===
- Marc d'Alsace
- Marc d’Auvergne
- Marc de Beaujolais
- Marc de Bourgogne
- Marc de Provence
- Marc de Savoie
- Marc d'Irouléguy
- Marc du Jura
- Marc des Côtes-du-Rhône
- Marc de Châteauneuf-du-Pape
- Marc de Gigondas
- Marc de muscat de Beaumes-de-Venise
- Marc du Bugey
- Marc de Champagne
- Marc de Lorraine
- Marc du Languedoc
- Grappa de Corse

=== In other countries ===
- Albania: Raki
- Bulgaria: Dzhibrovitsa (type of rakia)
- Chile: Aguardiente de Chillán
- Crete: Tsikoudia (also known as raki)
- Cyprus: Zivania
- Georgia: Chacha
- Germany: Tresterbrand
- Greece: Tsipouro
- Hungary: Törkölypálinka
- Italy: Grappa
- Portugal: Bagaceira
- Serbia and the Balkans: Komovica
- North Macedonia: Komova rakija
- Slovakia: Terkelica
- Slovenia: Tropinovec
- Spain: Orujo
- Switzerland: Marc, Grappa
- Romania: Rachiu
- Turkey: Rakı
