= Tsipouro =

Alcoholic beverage from Greece

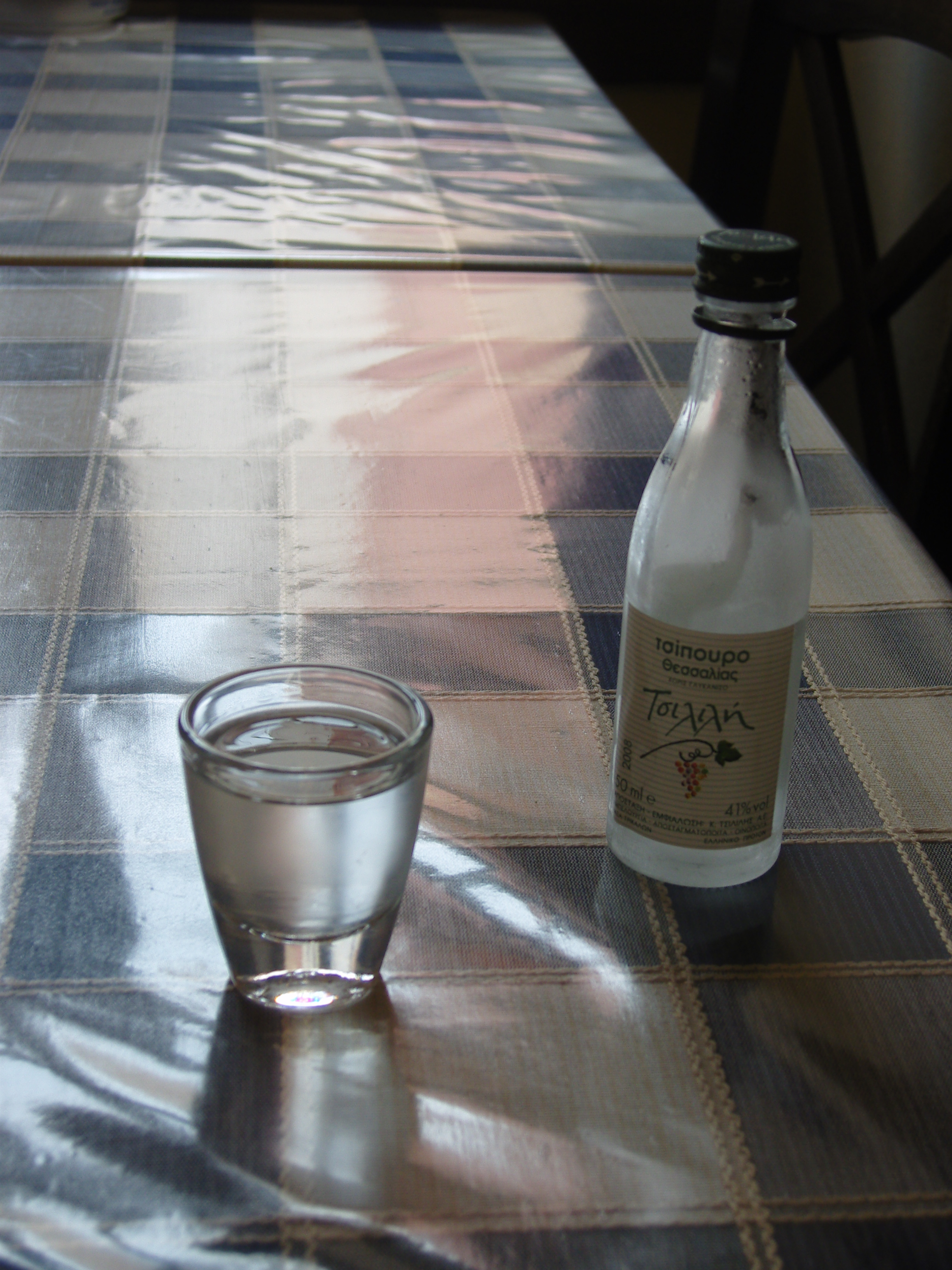
Tsipouro

Tsipouro (Greek: τσίπουρο, romanized: tsípouro) is an un-aged brandy from Greece and in particular Thessaly, Epirus, Macedonia. Tsipouro is a strong distilled spirit containing 40–45% alcohol by volume and is traditionally produced from grape pomace (the residue of the winepress) or, alternatively, directly from wine after the grapes and juices have been separated. Tsipouro is typically produced in two varieties: pure, which is the default, and anise-flavored, which is a relatively new variation introduced during the 1900s. While tsipouro is usually not aged in barrels, barrel-aged versions are also available. It is similar to tsikoudia produced on the island of Crete, but unlike tsikoudia, which is single-distilled and contains no additional flavorings, tsipouro is typically double-distilled and may sometimes include spices, i.e. anise.

== History ==
According to tradition, the first production of tsipouro was the work of Greek Orthodox monks in the 14th century on Mount Athos in Macedonia, Greece.

== Method of production ==
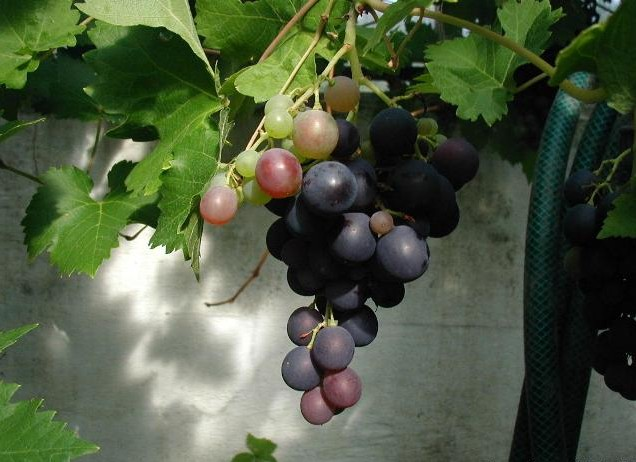
Grapes used for making tsipouro

Ripe dark grapes are passed through crusher/destemmers. The mass is left to settle for a few days, just enough to get fermentation started. Formerly, wine would be collected, and only the solid residue would be used for tsipouro in an attempt to get the most out of the plant. Today some producers use the whole of the pulp, without taking out the must for wine production. This results to a superior product, called "apostagma", sold at approximately twice the price of tsipouro.

In the next stage, the mass is fed into distillation units, where temperature and pressure are closely monitored. The first and last distinct batches (the "head" and the "tail") are discarded. These fractions are discarded because they are considered either dangerous or unpleasant to consume. More specifically, the "head" contains high concentrations of toxic methanol, while the "tail" is rich in heavy organic acids and higher alcohols that negatively affect the spirit's flavor.

Thus, only the intermediate batch (known as the "heart") is kept to make tsipouro. This process is repeated to obtain doubly distilled tsipouro, which might be superior.

Finally, the distillate is left to settle and mature in stainless steel tanks. It can also be aged in wooden barrels to give "aged tsipouro", a relatively new beverage that can be compared to whiskey. As it’s consequential, the distillation process produces a substantial volume of organic waste, primarily consisting of grape pomace and residues. Recent studies have focused on upgrading these agricultural by-products into biochar, offering an eco-friendly method for waste management and nutrient recycling in local spirit production.

== Serving ==
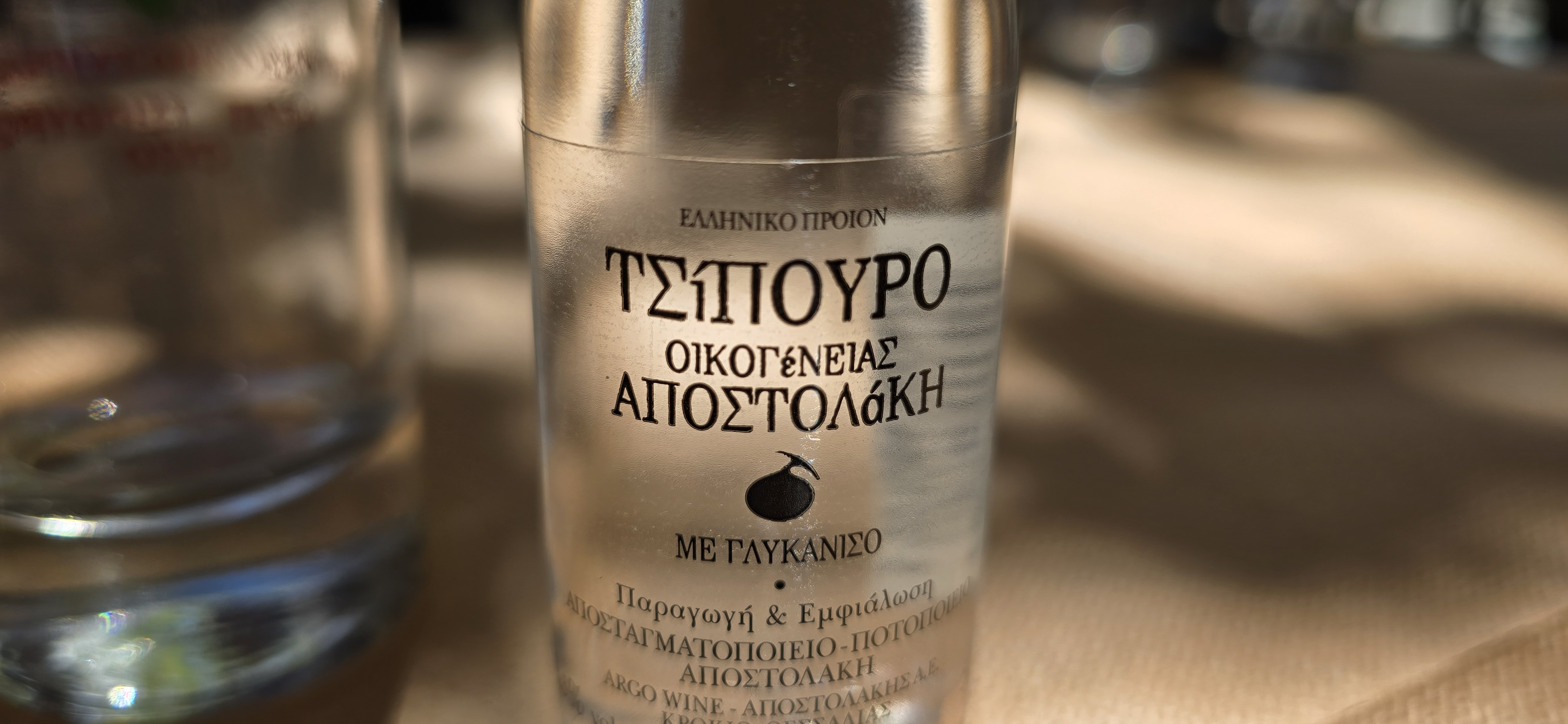
Single-serving bottle of anise-flavored tsipouro

Depending on the time of year, tsipouro is used either as refreshment or as a hot beverage, and depending on the time of day, it replaces the drinking of coffee or wine. Tsipouro and tsikoudia, like all alcoholic beverages in Greece, are generally consumed at social gatherings.

According to Greek manufacturers, the best way to enjoy tsipouro is straight from the fridge. Some people prefer to either dilute with water or add ice.

Tsipouro is usually served in shot glasses with meze (a small side dish) such as nuts, dried fruit, raisins, cheese, olives, seafood, meat, halva, or paximadi (rusk).

In 2006, Greece filed a request for tsipouro to be recognized as a PDO (protected designation of origin) product, which was granted later that year.

== Relation to ouzo ==
Anise-flavoured tsipouro is also available, produced especially in Macedonia and Thessaly. Anise-flavoured tsipouro and ouzo have almost identical taste, but vary enormously in their method of production. The alcohol used to produce ouzo is 96% ABV rectified spirit (ethyl alcohol of agricultural origin) and therefore does not retain the flavours of the primary distilled products, whereas the lower degree of distillation of tsipouro allows it to retain the aroma of the pomace.

== See also ==
- Tsikoudia (Crete)
- Mastika (Chios)
- Grappa (Italy)
- Orujo (Spain)
- Zivania (Cyprus)
- Komovica (North Macedonia/Serbia)
- Rakiya (Bulgaria)
- Raki (Turkey)
- Arak (Lebanon)
