= Tropinovec =

Tropinovec is the Slovene variation of marc or pomace brandy, i.e. a spirit made out of grapes remaining in the wine press after the expression of grape juice, or tropine. According to Article 4 of the Slovene Rules on Spirit Drinks, the appellation tropinovec can only be used to describe spirits distilled out of grape marc. If a spirit is produced out of marc or other fruit, the name tropinovec needs to be preceded by the name of that fruit.

Because it is neutral in terms of taste and smell, home-produced tropinovec is commonly used to soak fruit in it, thus producing a variety of fruit based spirits: borovničevec with blueberries, višnjevec with sour cherries, orehovec with walnuts, etc. It can also be used with herbs or honey (medica). But tropinovec is not necessarily a low-grade spirit. When fine wine varieties are used to produce it, it can be marketed as a stand-alone product.
