= Komovica =

Alcoholic beverage

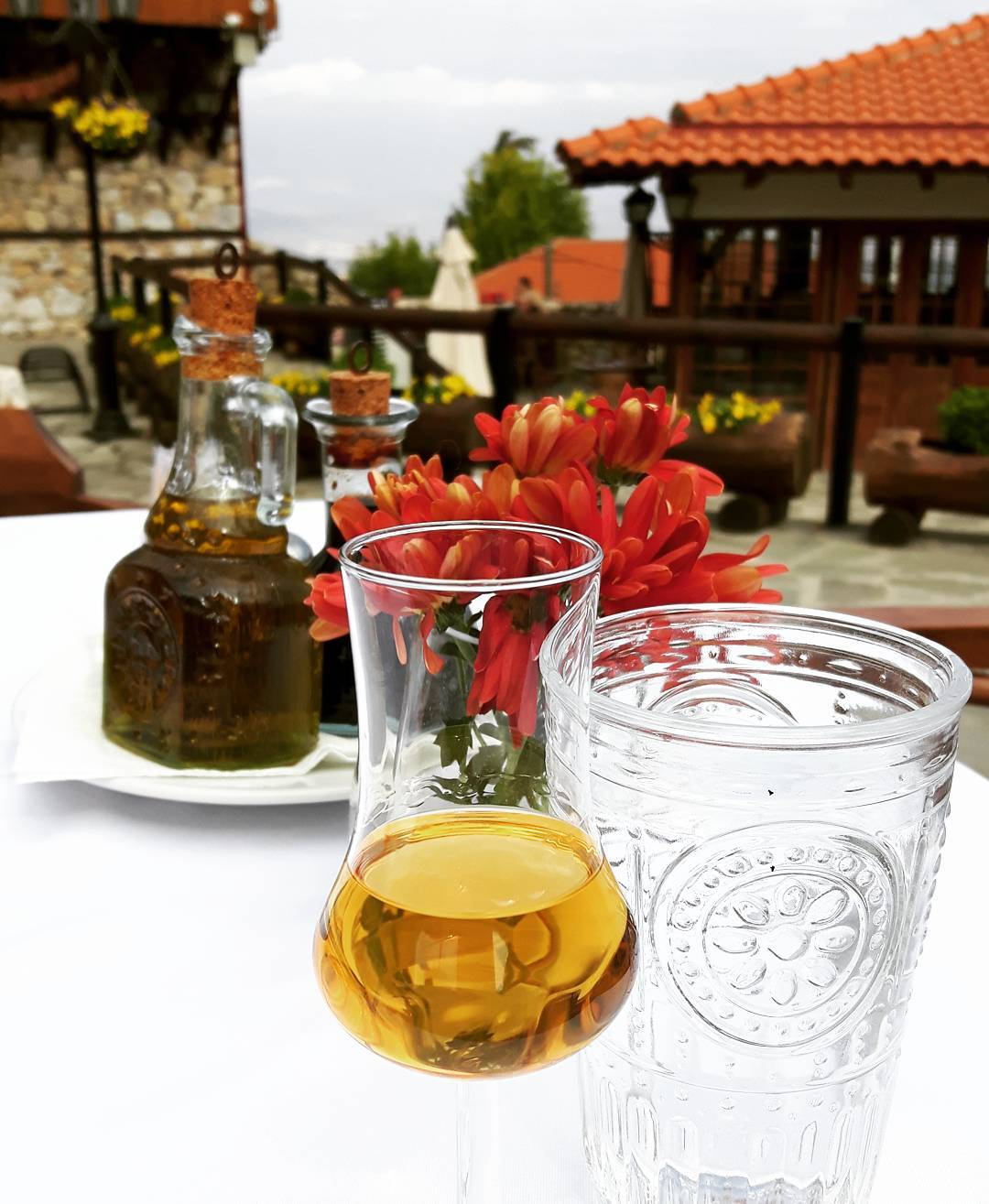
Rakija

Komovica is an alcoholic beverage popular in Serbia and North Macedonia. Komovica is a homemade rakia made of grape pomace, usually containing more than 50% alcohol by volume. It is mostly used for medical purposes.

== See also ==
- Pomace brandy
