= Orujo =

Spanish pomace brandy

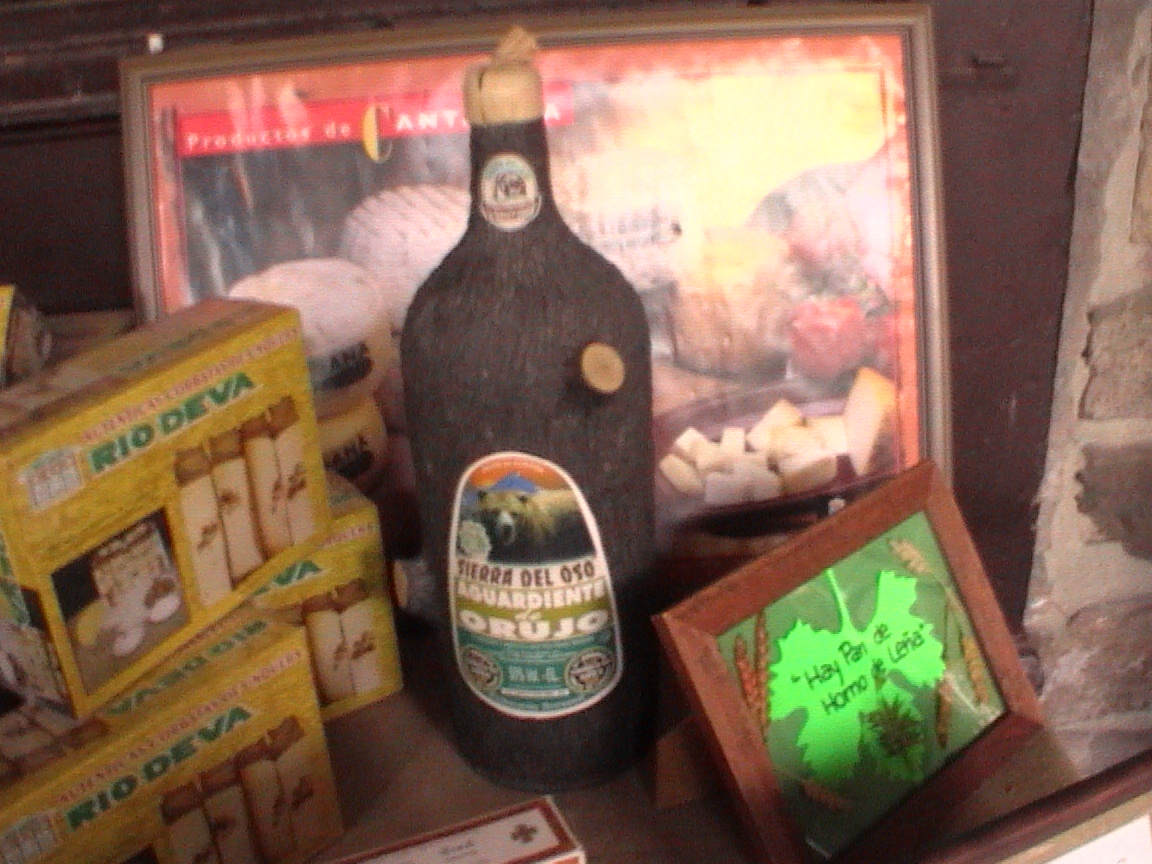
A bottle of orujo (Cantabrian brand Sierra del Oso)

Orujo is a pomace brandy (a liquor obtained from the distillation of marc, the solid remains left after pressing of the grape) from northern Spain. It is a transparent spirit with an alcohol content over 50% (100°US; 87.6ºBritain and Commonwealth proof). Its name comes from the expression "aguardiente de orujo" (pomace spirit).

It is popular in northern Spain, particularly in Galicia, but also in Asturias, Castile and León and Cantabria (principally in the valley of Liébana). It is also called augardente or aguardiente ("firewater"), and caña. orujo has become an artisanal craft for some families who after making wine for themselves distill the pomace in a little pot still. Many high-quality distilled spirits have appeared in the last twenty years, including some origin appellations (in Spanish, D.O.). These are obtained from quality grapes and produced according to the highest standards and are replacing the traditional homemade liquor, nowadays only available in small villages.

== Production ==
Orujo's basic ingredient is the residue from wine production. Once the grapes are crushed, the orujos or residue of the grapes can be used to produce the liqueur of the same name. The grape skins, seeds and stalks are fermented in closed vats and then distilled. Stills, called alambiques, alquitaras or potas are traditionally large copper kettles that are heated over an open fire, while a poteiro (orujo distiller) watches over his brew. The distilling process in the alambiques takes six hours or more. The copper stills used by Galicians for centuries are thought to have been brought to the Iberian Peninsula by the Arabs, which in fact, never was.

The orujo that is produced by the distillation is a colorless liquor, while the orujo envejecido or "aged orujo" is amber in color. The aged variety is fermented and distilled the same way, but is then poured into oak barrels to age for at least two years.

== History ==
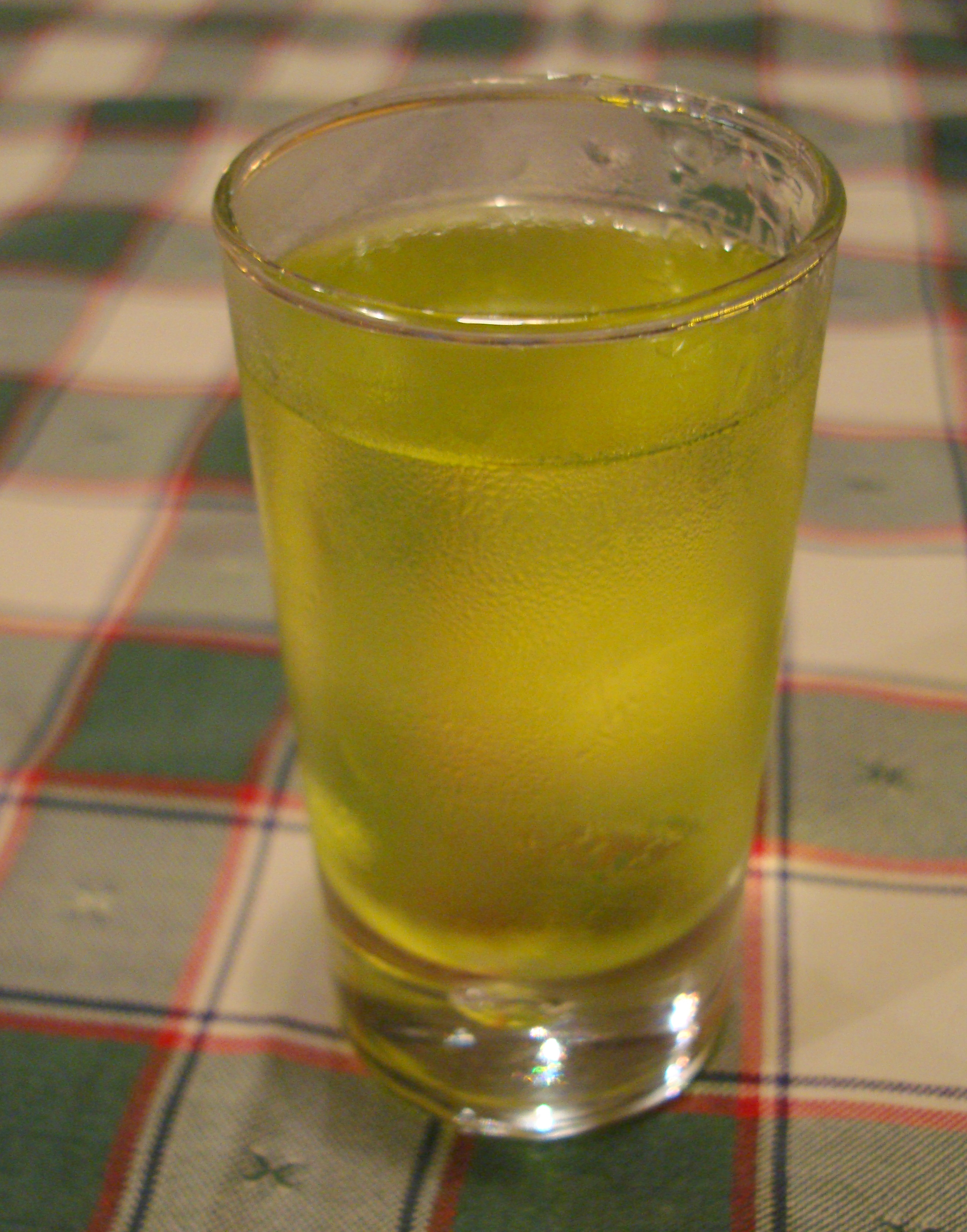
A glass of orujo de hierbas

Orujo is made in the north of Portugal and Spain. The monasteries in the county of Liébana, Cantabria has been distilling orujo since the Middle Ages. Each November the town of Potes celebrates the "Fiesta del Orujo", including tastings and a contest where participants distill orujo in public with their own stills and judges award a prize for the best-tasting batch. Since the 16th century Galicians have made orujo on their farms and take great pride in their liqueur, each family carefully guarding their own secret recipe. However, there are now over 20 commercial producers of orujo within Denominación Específica Orujo de Galicia, ("Denomination Orujo of Galicia"), which was formed in 1989.

== Orujo beverages ==
From orujo, Galicians traditionally make a drink called "queimada" (= burnt), in which bits of lemon peel, sugar and ground coffee are put into a clay pot or a hollow pumpkin when available. Then the orujo is poured on top and the pot is set fire to and allowed to burn until the flame turns blue.

In the Cantabria, León and Asturias mountain regions of the Cantabrian Mountains, three main derived versions are known, the original, orujo de hierbas (or té de los puertos, "tea of the mountain passes"), orujo de café (café de los puertos) and crema de orujo ("orujo cream"), among others lesser known.

== Other versions ==
Other pomace brandies similar to orujo, although with distinct names and characteristics, are also found in other countries, such as France (marc), Italy (grappa), Germany (tresterschnaps), Portugal (bagaceira), Hungary (törkölypálinka), Romania (rachiul de tescovina), while in Bulgaria, Serbia, Montenegro, Croatia, Greece and Cyprus it is the local variant of rakia. In Galicia itself it is also sometimes referred to as augardente, and in the rest of Spain as aguardiente.

The term "orujo" (in Galician, bagazo) is also sometimes used as a synonym for the pomace of the grape (prior to distillation).
