= Törkölypálinka =

Hungarian alcoholic beverage

Törkölypálinka (pomace pálinka, also Torkolypalinka) is a Hungarian pomace brandy, an alcoholic beverage produced by distillation from grape residues (pomace) left over from winemaking. One of the oldest types of pálinka, it is thought to aid digestion, and is usually consumed in small quantities after meals.

Under the 2008, LXXIII, Law of the Republic of Hungary, the Hungarian Pálinka Law, only distilled beverages made using special methods and technology, from fruits produced in Hungary, mashed, distilled, matured and bottled in Hungary can be called pálinka. Alcoholic beverages made from concentrates, semi-dried, or dried fruit cannot legally be called "pálinka".

Törköly is the name of the substance consisting of parts of the grapes (pomace) that remains in the press after they are pressed in the process of wine making. Depending on the weather, the type of the grapes and the method used for pressing, 15% to 30% törköly is produced as a by-product during the process of wine making, which is then used for making törkölypálinka.

Once, törkölypálinka was one of the most commonly produced types of pálinka. In the 1950, for example, 30% of all the pálinka produced was törkölypálinka, but the share of this type of pálinka has become smaller since then. A grape distillate from tokaji aszú has been produced since the 1960s. It is a blend of flavours resembling Italian grape distillates and of the aromas of aszú wine.

The beginnings of its regular production probably date back to the 15th century. Its production became so common in the 17th century that it had to be regulated by law. In those days, most törköly distillers working in Hungary were German by origin.

Törkölypálinka is distilled in February, March, or in April at the latest. The törköly is no longer suitable for distillation later than that. The törköly from red grapes is less precious because its acetic fermentation starts soon after the grapes are pressed.
