= Rakia =

Fruit brandy popular in the Balkans

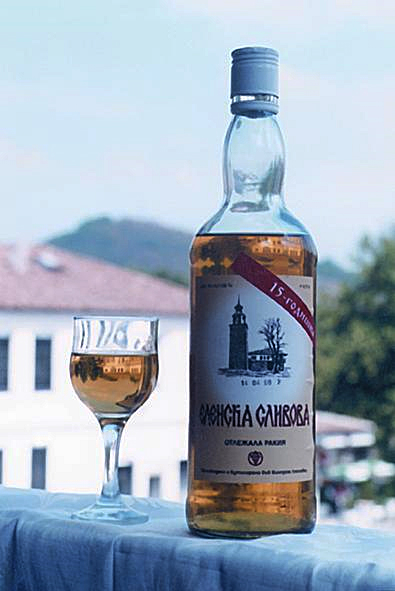
- Type: Liqueur
- Origin: Bulgaria or Serbia (Note: Bulgarian archaeologists have identified an 11th-century fragment of a distillation vessel, which some historians interpret as evidence that rakia may have originated in Bulgaria. The earliest written record of rakia production appears in a 14th-century Serbian source. There are 14th-century inscriptions mentioning rakia in Bulgaria.)
- Alcohol by volume: 40+ vol-%
- Flavour: various fruits, incl. grape, plum, peach, apricot

Rakia, rakija, rakiya, rachiu or rikea (/ˈrɑːkiə, ˈræ-, rəˈkiːə/), is the collective term for fruit spirits or fruit brandy popular in Southeastern Europe. The alcohol content of rakia is normally 40% ABV, but home-produced rakia can be stronger (typically 50–80%).

== Overview ==
Rakia is produced from fermented and distilled fruits, typically plums and grapes, but also apricots, pears, cherries or raspberries. Other fruits less commonly used are peaches, apples, figs, blackberries, and quince.

Common flavours are šljivovica and țuică, produced from plums, kaysieva/kajsija, produced from apricots, or grozdova/lozova in Bulgaria, raki rrushi in Albania, lozovača/komovica in Croatia, North Macedonia, Montenegro, Serbia, Bosnia and Herzegovina all produced from grapes.

Plum and grape rakia are sometimes mixed with other ingredients, such as herbs, honey, sour cherries and walnuts, after distillation.

== By country ==
=== Albania ===
Raki (Albanian definite form: rakia) (a type of rakia) is a traditional drink in Albania. Until the 19th century, meyhanes would serve wine or meze.

=== Bulgaria ===
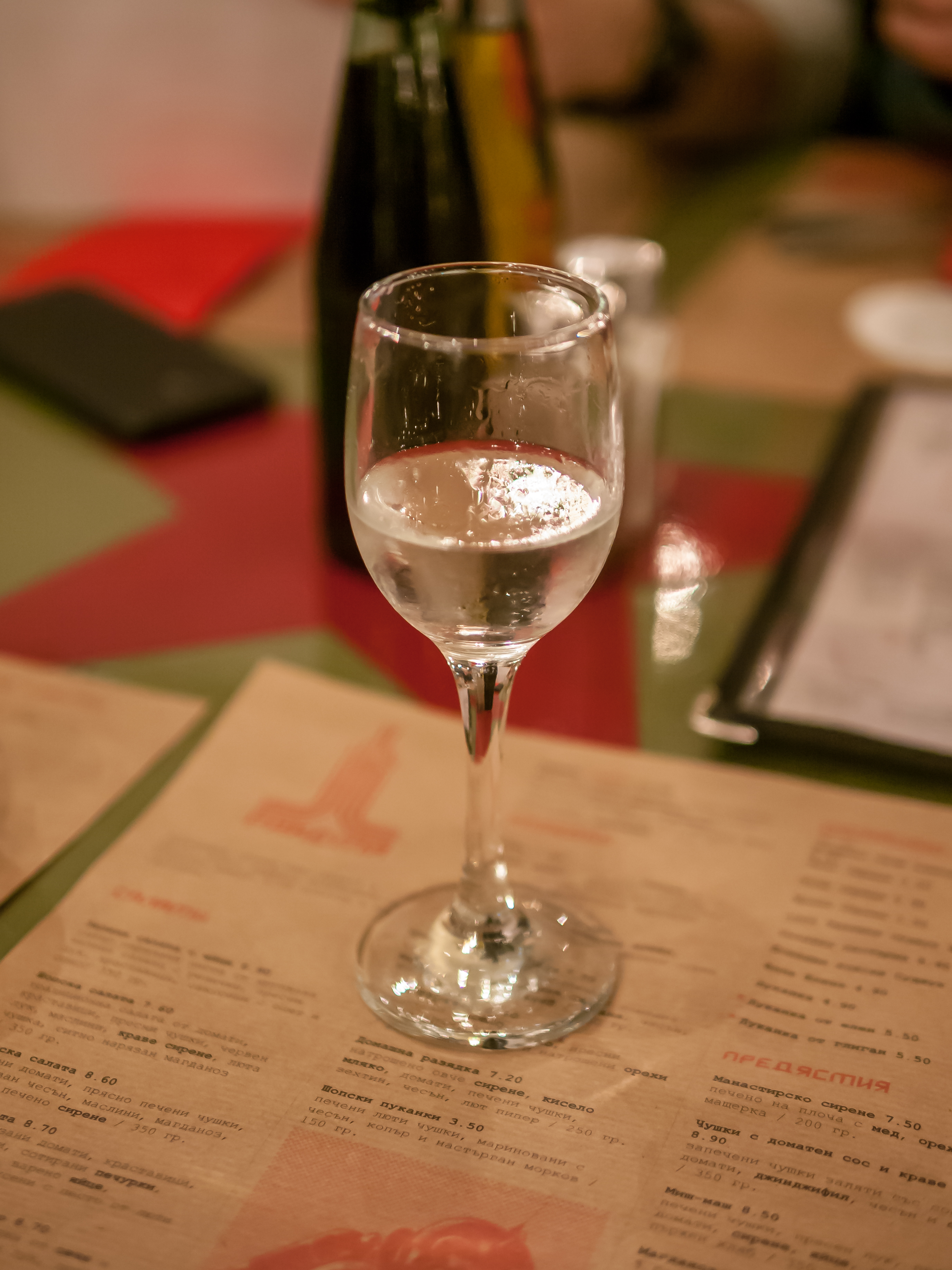
A glass of rakiya in a restaurant in Sofia, Bulgaria

Bulgaria cites an old piece of pottery from the 14th century in which the word rakiya (Bulgarian: ракия) is inscribed. The inscription on it reads: "I have celebrated with rakia." The country has taken measures to declare the drink as a national drink in the European Union to allow lower excise duty domestically but has yet yielded no concrete results. During an archaeological study, Bulgarian archaeologists discovered an 11th-century fragment of a distillation vessel used for the production of rakiya. Due to the age of the fragment, contradicting the idea that rakiya production only began in the 16th century, historians believe this indicates that rakiya did originally come from Bulgaria. The EU recognizes 12 brands of Bulgarian rakiya through the Protected Designation of Origin (PDO) and Protected Geographical Indication (PGI) marks, which protect the name of products from a specific region that follow a traditional production process.

=== Croatia ===
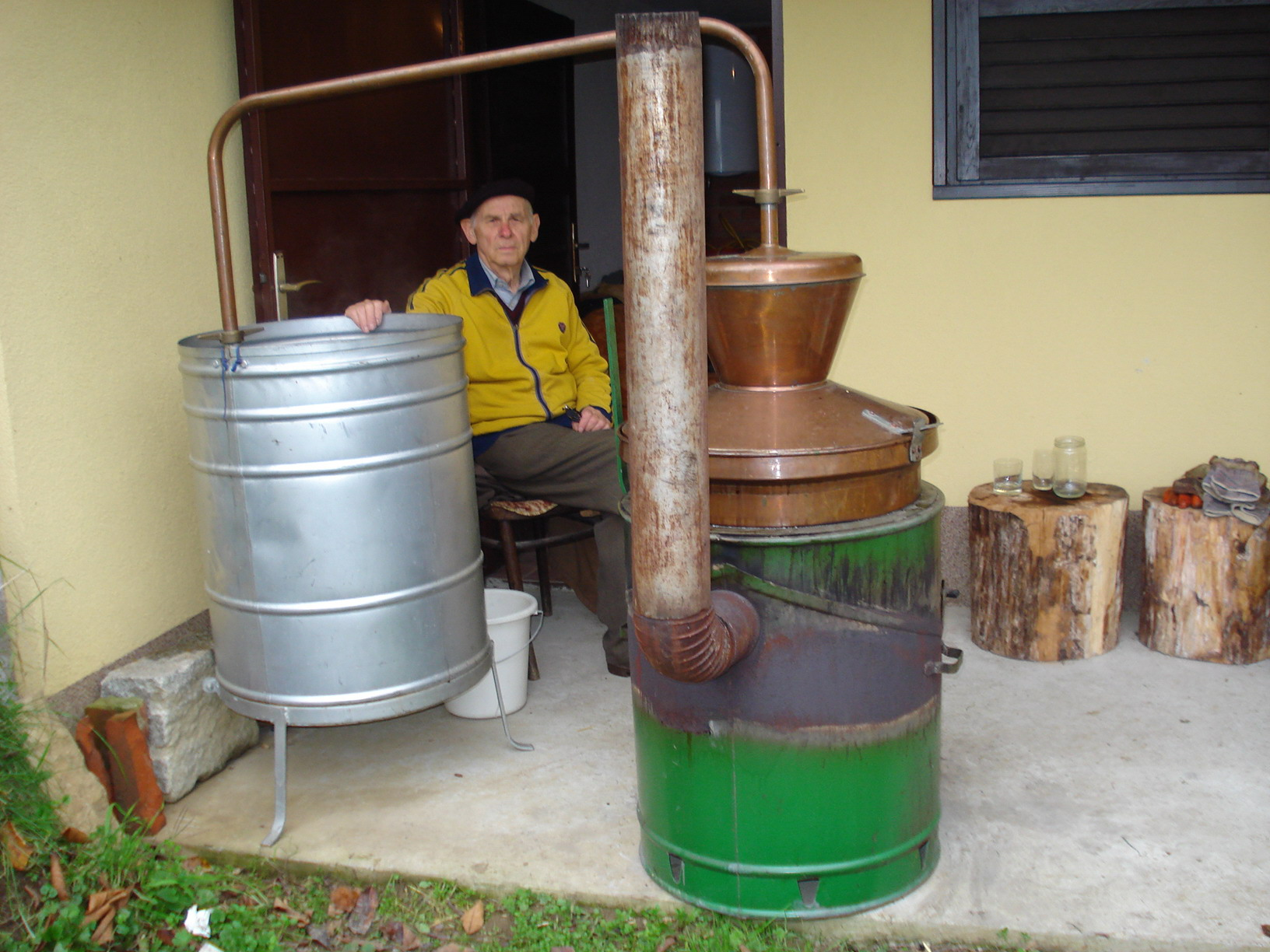
Traditional distillation of rakija (plum spirit) in Međimurje (northern Croatia)

Rakija was the most popular spirit in Croatia in 2012. However, as of 2021, liquor had taken that top ranking.. Travarica (herbal rakija) is usually served at the beginning of a meal, together with dried figs. The Croatian Adriatic coast is known for a great variety of herbal rakija, some typical for only one island or group of islands. The island Hvar is famous for rakija containing Myrtus (mrtina—bitter and dark brown). Southern islands, such as Korčula, as well as the city of Dubrovnik are famous for anise (aniseta) rakija, and in central Dalmatia the most popular rakija is rakija with walnuts (orahovica). That rakija is usually homemade, and served with dry cookies or dried figs. In the summer, it's quite typical to see huge glass jars of rakija with nuts steeping inside on every balcony, because the process requires orahovica to be exposed to the sun. In the northern Adriatic—mainly Istria—rakija is typically made of honey (medica) or mistletoe (biska). Biska, which is yellow-brown and sweet, is a typical liquor of Istria. In the interior of the country a spirit called šljivovica (shlivovitza) is made from plums, and one called viljamovka (viliam-ovka) is made from Williams pears. Croatia has EU Protected Geographical Indication of 6 rakija products (Zadarski maraschino, Hrvatska travarica, Hrvatski pelinkovac, Hrvatska stara šljivovica, Slavonska šljivovica and Hrvatska loza).

=== Greece ===
In Greece, the most popular traditional Cretan spirit is known as tsikoudia (Greek: τσικουδιά). On the mainland, a similar spirit called tsipouro (Greek: τσίπουρο) is prevalent. Both tsikoudia and tsipouro are informally referred to as raki due to the Ottoman-era nomenclature when raki was a generic term describing distilled liquors, a term which informally remains in use today.

Cretan tsikoudia is a pomace brandy made by single distilling grapes after most of their juice has been extracted to produce wine and having left them to ferment in barrels. Special permits are given from late October until the end of November to produce tsikoudia at home in Cretan villages. Unlike tsipouro, tsikoudia is not twice distilled and does not contain anise. It is commonly served cold as an apéritif with seafood and meze, usually referred to as rakomezedes, or as a complimentary digestif with spoon sweets or fruit after a meal.

Tsikoudia is an integral element of the island's culture, identified by many as "the national drink of Crete" and linked to hospitality.

=== Serbia ===
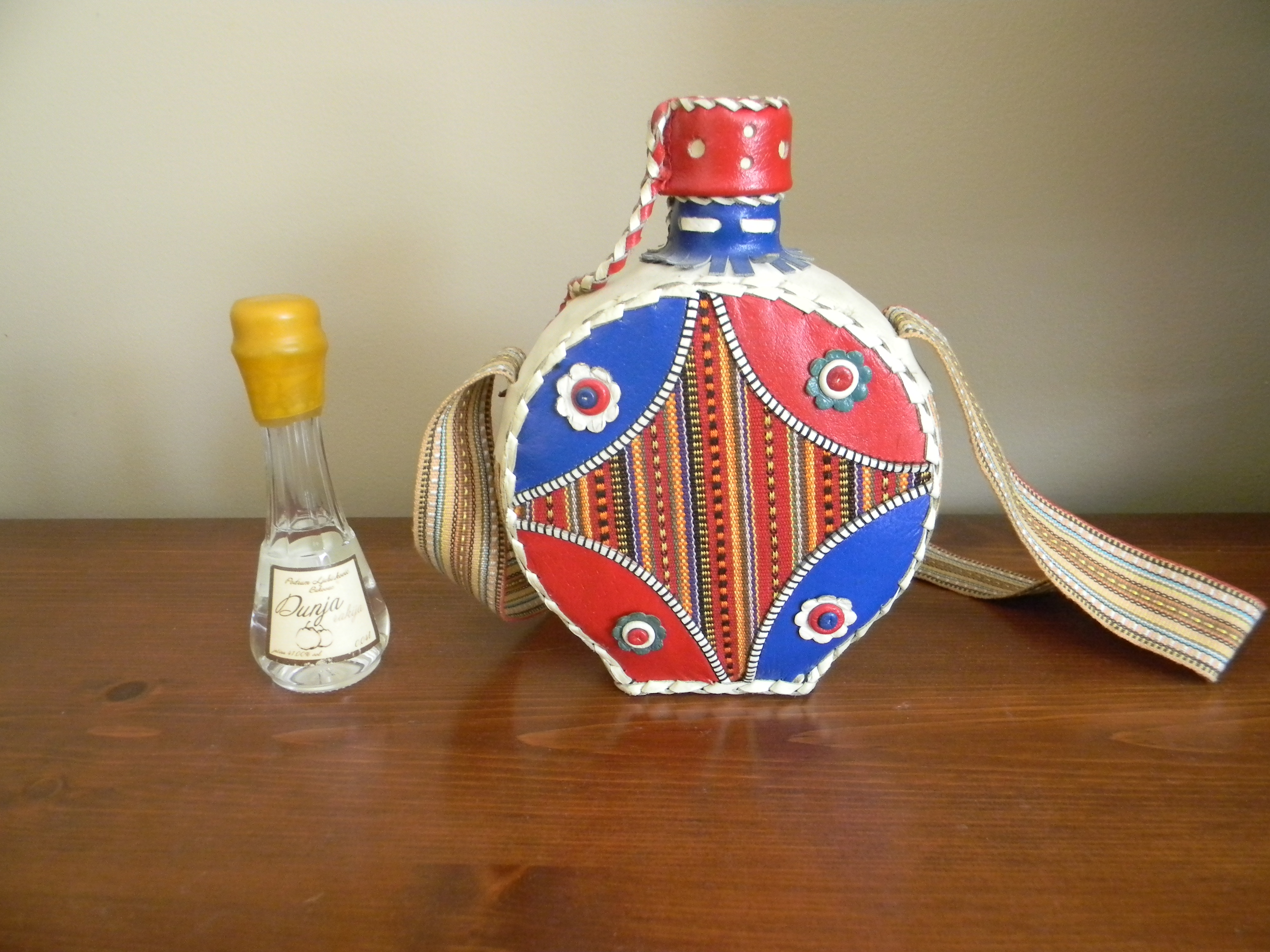
Quince rakija from Serbia in traditional flasks

Rakija (Serbian Cyrillic: Ракија) is one of the most popular alcoholic drinks in Serbia. It is the national drink of Serbia. The first legal and official rakija distillery, Bojkovčanka, was established in 1985 about 10 miles south of Belgrade. According to Dragan Đurić, President of the Association of Producers of Natural Spirits, the EU protects the names of beverages by allowing the prefix Serbian. In Serbia there are 10,000 private producers of rakija. Two thousand are on the official register and only about a hundred cellars produce a high-grade version of the spirit. The most popular rakijas in Serbia are: "sljivovica"- made from plums, as well as apricot rakija and pear rakija. Belgrade is the site of a Rakija museum. A 14th century Serbian source is the earliest documentary evidence of Rakija-making.

=== Turkey ===
Rakiya (not to be confused with similarly named, but entirely different, rakı) is also consumed in Turkey, but is far less popular than other distilled spirits or wine.

== Ritual use ==
At the end of the Orthodox Christian burial service, at the exit from the cemetery, visitors are offered a piece of soda bread (pogača) and a glass of rakia. When drinking "for the soul" of the deceased, one spills some rakia on the ground, saying "May God receive this for her/him", before drinking the rest.

It is also used as a sacramental element by the Bektashi Order, and Alevi Jem ceremonies, where it is not considered alcoholic and is referred to as "dem".

== Types ==
There are many kinds of rakia, depending on the fruit it is produced from:

Fruits	Bulgaria	Bosnia and Herzegovina, Croatia, Montenegro, North Macedonia, Serbia	Greece	Albania and Kosovo
Basic types
plum (slivovitz)	сливова (slivova) сливовица (slivovitsa)	šljivovica, шљивовица, шливка, сливка	Κουμπλόρακο (Ρακί κορόμηλου) / Raki koromilou	Raki Kumbulle
grapes	гроздова (grozdova) гроздовица (grozdovitsa) мускатова (muskatova)	лозова (lozova), lozovača/loza, лозова ракија/лозовача/лоза	Σταφυλόρακη (ρακί σταφυλής) / raki stafylis	Raki Rrushi
grape pomace (kom)	джиброва (dzhibrova) джибровица (dzhibrovitsa) шльокавица (shlyokavitsa)	komovica, комова ракија/комовица	Τσίπουρο-Τσικουδιά (ρακί στεμφύλων σταφυλής) / tsipouro-tsikoudia (raki stemfylon stafylis)	Raki Bërsi
apricot	кайсиева (kaysieva)	mareličarka, kajsijevača, кајсијевача	Ρακί βερίκοκου / raki verikokou	Raki Kajsie
peach	прасковена (praskovena)	rakija od breskve, ракија од брескве, breskavica	Ρακί ροδάκινου / raki rodakinou	Raki Pjeshke
pear	крушoва (krushova)	kruškovača/vilijamovka, крушковача/виљамовка, крушка	Ρακί αχλαδιού / raki achladiou	Raki Dardhe
apple	ябълкова (yabalkova)	jabukovača, јабуковача	Ρακί μήλου / raki milou	Raki Molle
mulberry	черничева (chernicheva) църница (tsarnitsa)	dudova rakija/dudovača/dudara, дудова ракија/дудовача/дудара	Ρακί απο σκάμνια, ρακί μούρων / raki apo skamnia, raki mouron	Raki Mëni
quince	дюлева (dyuleva)	dunjevača, дуњевача	Ρακί κυδωνιού / raki kydoniou	Raki Ftoji
fig	смокинова (smokinova)	smokovača, смоквача	Συκόρακη, Ρακί σύκου / Sykoraki, Raki sykou	Raki fiku
cherry	черешова (chereshova)	trešnjevača	Ρακί κερασιού / raki kerasiou	Raki qershie
mixed fruits	плодова (plodova)	—	Ρακί φρούτων / raki frouton	—
with sour cherries	вишновка (vishnovka)	višnjevac/višnjevača, вишњевача	Βυσνόρακι, Ρακί βύσσινου / Visnoraki, raki vyssinou	Raki Vishnje
With additions
with roses	гюлова (gyulova)	ružica	—	—
with herbs	билкова (bilkova)	travarica, траварица/trava	—	—
with bilberries	—	borovnička, боровничка	—	Raki Boronice
with juniper		klekovača, клековача	—	Raki Dëllinje
with honey	медена (medena)	medenica, medovača, medica, medenjača, zamedljana (very popular in Istria—a region in Croatia), медовача/medovača, medovice	Ρακόμελο / rakomelo	Raki e Pjekur
with anise	анасонлийка (anasonliyka)	mastika, мастика	Τσίπουρο με γλυκάνισο / tsipouro me glykaniso	—

== Notes ==
2.Kom or komina is the fruity grape mash that remains after winemaking. It contains up to 5.5 litres of pure alcohol per 100 kg, and at least 40% dry matter.
3.Not to be confused with mead, which is made solely of honey.

== See also ==
- Chacha (brandy)
- Liqueur
- Nalewka
- Pomace brandy
- Pálinka
