= Chacha (brandy) =

Type of alcoholic beverage

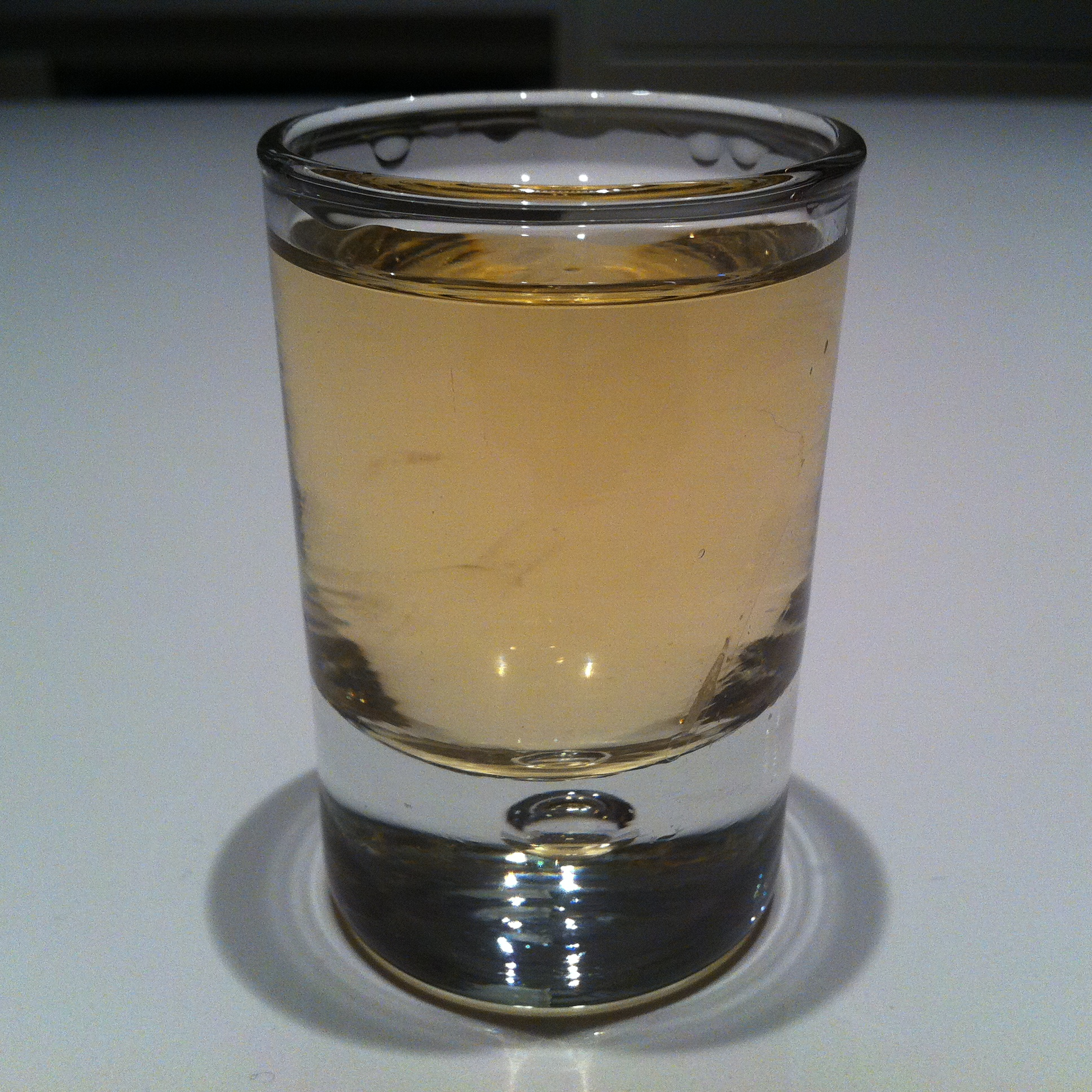
A shot of Chacha

Chacha (Georgian: ჭაჭა, romanized: ch'ach'a; [tʃʼatʃʼa]) is a Georgian pomace brandy, clear and strong (ranging between 40% alcohol for commercially produced to 85% for home brew), which is sometimes called "wine vodka", "grape vodka", or "Georgian vodka/grappa".

== History ==
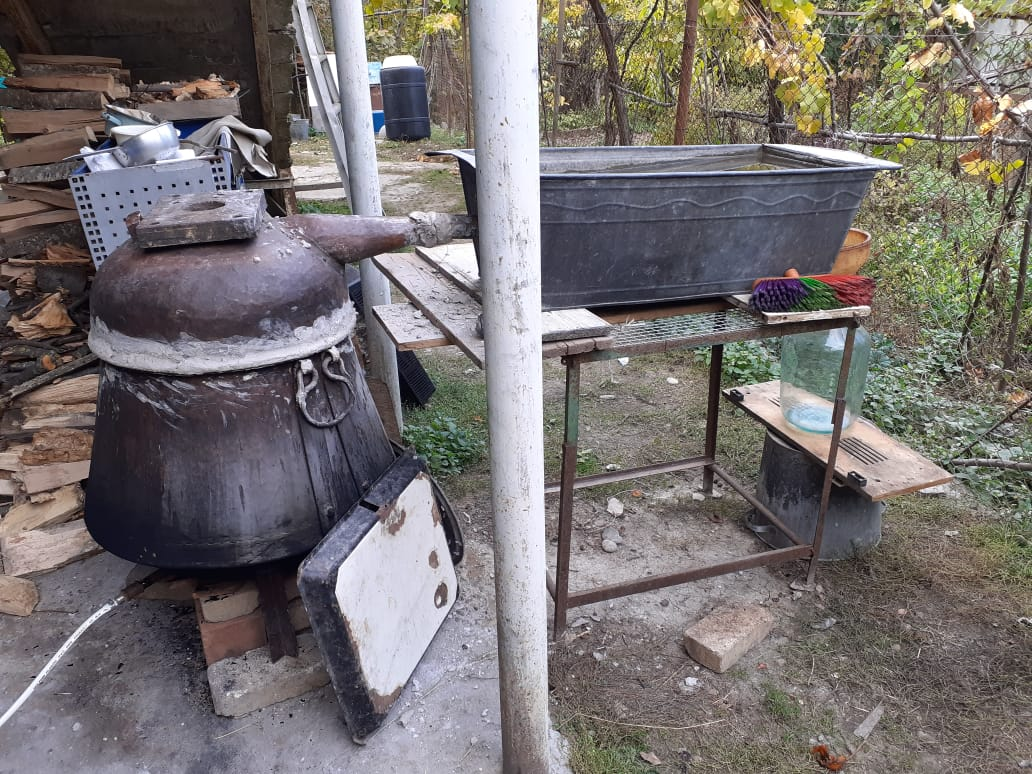
Georgian home distillery

It is made of grape pomace (grape residue left after making wine). The term chacha is used in Georgia to refer to grape distillate. It may be also produced from unripe or wild grapes. Other common fruits or herbs used are figs, tangerines, oranges, mulberries or tarragon.

The Kakheti region, which is in the easternmost part of the country, accounts for 75% of all vineyards (approximately 33,000 hectares) in Georgia.

Traditionally only a homedistilled drink of Georgians, it is today also commonly produced by professional distillers and most wineries who include it in their product range. The type and flavor of the different varieties of local chacha can differ depending on the region in which they are produced. For example, chacha made by producers in the Kakheti region tend to have more of an oak flavoring than chacha made in the capital city of Tbilisi. Among the larger companies, some of the more popular include Chateau Mukharni, Teliani Valley, Telavi Wine Cellar, and Vazi+. These distilleries have enhanced the traditional flavor and aromas of chacha through the addition of natural ingredients. Teliani Valley, for instance, distills four types of distinct chacha: Gold, made in aged oak barrels; Silver, made only with pomace from Rkatsiteli grapes; Honey, in which the chacha is distilled with honeycombs; and Ice, a version with a higher alcoholic content. Vazi+ has commercialized three types of chacha under their “Binekhi” label, all of which have proved to be exceedingly popular. All three types are distilled twice, and the most expensive – Binekhi Estragon – includes the addition of natural estragon (tarragon).

One of the most famous chacha products is the Binekhi Estragon, which became distinguished with the silver medal at the 2007 Mundus Vini awards. Competing with over 5,000 other wines and spirits, Chateau Mukhrani's chacha won the gold medal at the 2011 Hong Kong International Wine and Spirits Competition. At the 2012 Chisinau Wines and Spirits Contest in the Republic of Moldova, the Traditional Winery of Kakheti won five silver medals for its chacha.

In 2005 the government of Georgia enacted new intellectual property legislation called the “Law on Appellations of Origin and Geographical Indications of Goods” (the AOGI Law). This law primarily allows for the registrations of appellations of origin (AO) and geographical indications (GI) for wines, spirits, and mineral waters originating in Georgia. Many of Georgia's famous wines that make up the grape pomace were registered as AOs internationally through the Lisbon System for the International Registration of Appellations of Origin. On 13 December 2011, the Ministry of Agriculture of the Government of Georgia registered “chacha” as the first GI in the country.

The city of Batumi, second largest city of Georgia has implemented a unique campaign based on the power of the chacha brand. In the center of the city, a 25-meter tower was built in 2012 that house an observation deck, clock, pools, and tourist information center. Outside the chacha tower is an ornate water fountain, which for 10 – 15 minutes once per week flows with chacha made from local distillers instead of water. The tower was demolished in 2024.

== See also ==
- Sake
- Vodka
