= Eau de vie =

French clear, colorless fruit brandy

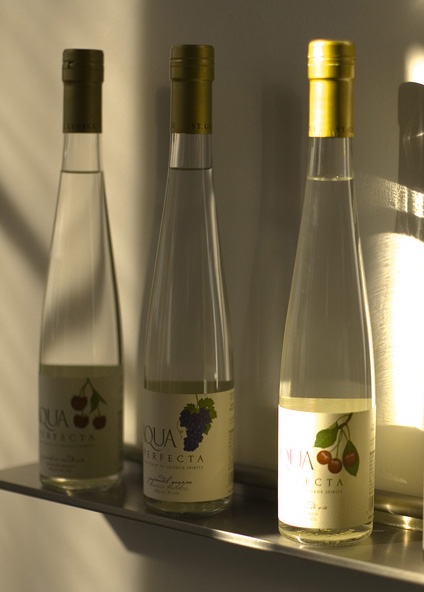
Three bottles of eau de vie. The flavors are framboise (raspberry), zinfandel grape, and Kirsch (cherry).

An eau de vie (Note: English: /oʊdəˈviː/; French: [odəvi]. Plural: eaux de vie. The phrase can also be hyphenated eau-de-vie and eaux-de-vie) (French for spirit, lit. 'water of life') is a clear, colourless fruit brandy that is produced by fermentation and double distillation. The fruit flavour is typically very light.

In English-speaking countries, eau de vie refers to a distilled beverage made from fruit other than grapes. Similar terms may be local translations or may specify the fruit used to produce it. Although eau de vie is a French term, similar beverages are produced in other countries (e.g., German Schnaps, Greek ούζο, Turkish rakı, Balkan rakia, Romanian țuică, Czech and Slovak pálenka, Hungarian pálinka, and Sri Lankan coconut arrack). In French, however, eau de vie is a generic term for distilled spirits. The proper French term for fruit brandy is eau-de-vie de fruit, while eau-de-vie de vin means wine spirit (brandy), and several further categories of spirits (distilled from grape pomace, lees of wine, beer, cereals, etc.) are also legally defined as eau-de-vie in a similar fashion. Many eaux de vie made from fruits, wine, pomace, or rye have a protected designation of origin within the European Union.

== Production ==
=== Fruit spirit ===
Traditional fruit spirits are made with ripe fruit that is fermented, distilled, and quickly bottled to preserve the freshness and aroma of the parent fruit. Eaux de vie are typically not aged in wooden casks; hence, they are clear. Although this is the usual practice, some distillers age their products before bottling.

=== Geist ===
Some fruits, such as raspberries, rowanberries, rosehips, and sloes, do not contain sufficient sugars for fermentation. Instead, the spirits are produced by macerating the fruit in neutral grain spirits for some time before distillation. The legal term used for these spirits within the European Union is Geist, meaning "spirit" in German. Geist can also be produced with vegetables, nuts, herbs, and other plant materials such as rose petals, mushrooms, or pumpkin seeds.

== Varieties ==
Most commonly available flavours in France are eau de vie de poire (pear, known as eau de vie de Poire Williams when made from the Williams pear), eau de vie de framboise (raspberry), eau de vie de pomme (apple), eau de vie de mirabelle (mirabelle plum), and eau de vie de pêche (peach). When made from pomace, it is called pomace brandy or marc.

While most eaux de vie from the Alpine regions of Europe rest only briefly in glass containers, others are aged in wooden casks before bottling. Thus, calvados, an apple-based spirit from northwestern France, is required by law to spend at least two years in wood, and most producers also offer much older products (up to 20 years or more). Some slivovitz are also aged in wooden casks, giving them their golden or amber color and additional flavors. Romanian țuică bătrână is aged in casks made from mulberry wood, which impart a pale brown color.

In the Caribbean, eaux-de-vie are made from tropical fruits such as banana, ambarella, guava, mango, pineapple, and sapodilla.

The term can also refer to maple eau de vie, made from maple syrup. Acerum is a Canadian eau de vie made in Quebec from maple syrup.

== Legal definition & regulation ==
Regulation (EU) 2019/787 of 17 April 2019 lays down rules on the definition, description, presentation, and labelling of spirit drinks (including eau-de-vie), the use of spirit drink names in the presentation and labelling of other foodstuffs, the protection of geographical indications for spirit drinks, and the use of ethyl alcohol and distillates of agricultural origin in alcoholic beverages. It repealed Regulation (EC) No 110/2008.

In France, provisions of the Code de la consommation, including Article L. 412-1, provide a national legal basis for decrees that can set detailed rules on product presentation and labelling, insofar as they are compatible with EU.

== Serving ==
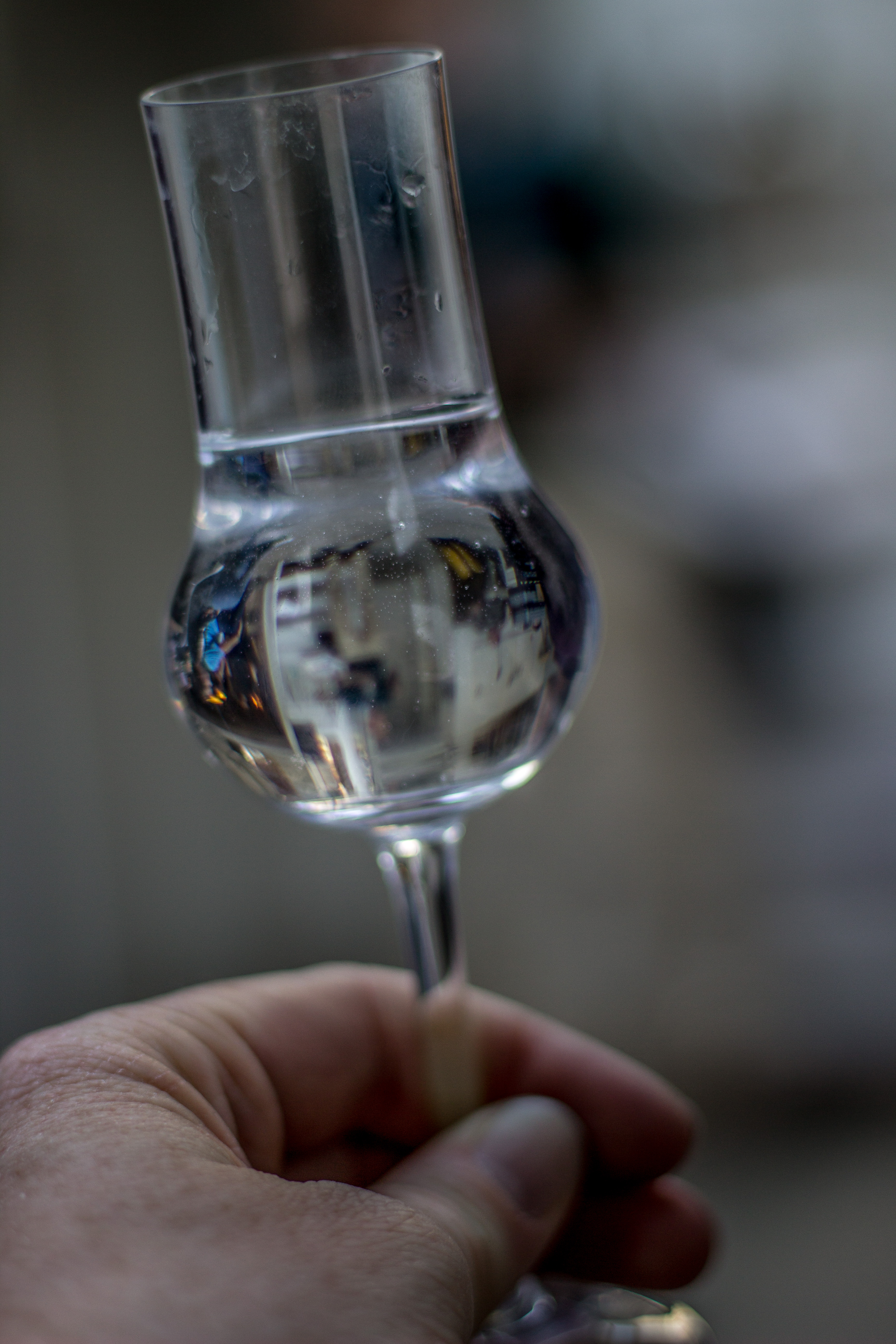
An Eau de vie in a traditional nosing glass

An eau de vie is usually served as a digestif. The typical serving size is 30 to 60 ml (1.1 to 2.1 imp fl oz; 1.0 to 2.0 US fl oz), owing to the high alcohol content of the spirit and because it is typically drunk after a meal during which wine or another alcoholic beverage has already been served.

It is also sometimes used in traditional French recipes for deglazing, instead of or along with white wine.

Eaux de vie should be served cold.

== See also ==
- Akvavit
- Aqua vitae
- Aguardiente
- Brandy
- Chacha
- Damassine
- Grappa
- Kirsch
- Liquor
- Orujo
- Pálinka
- Rakia
- Schnapps
- St. George Spirits – an American producer of eau de vie
- Țuică
- Williamine
