= Himbeergeist =

Distilled beverage

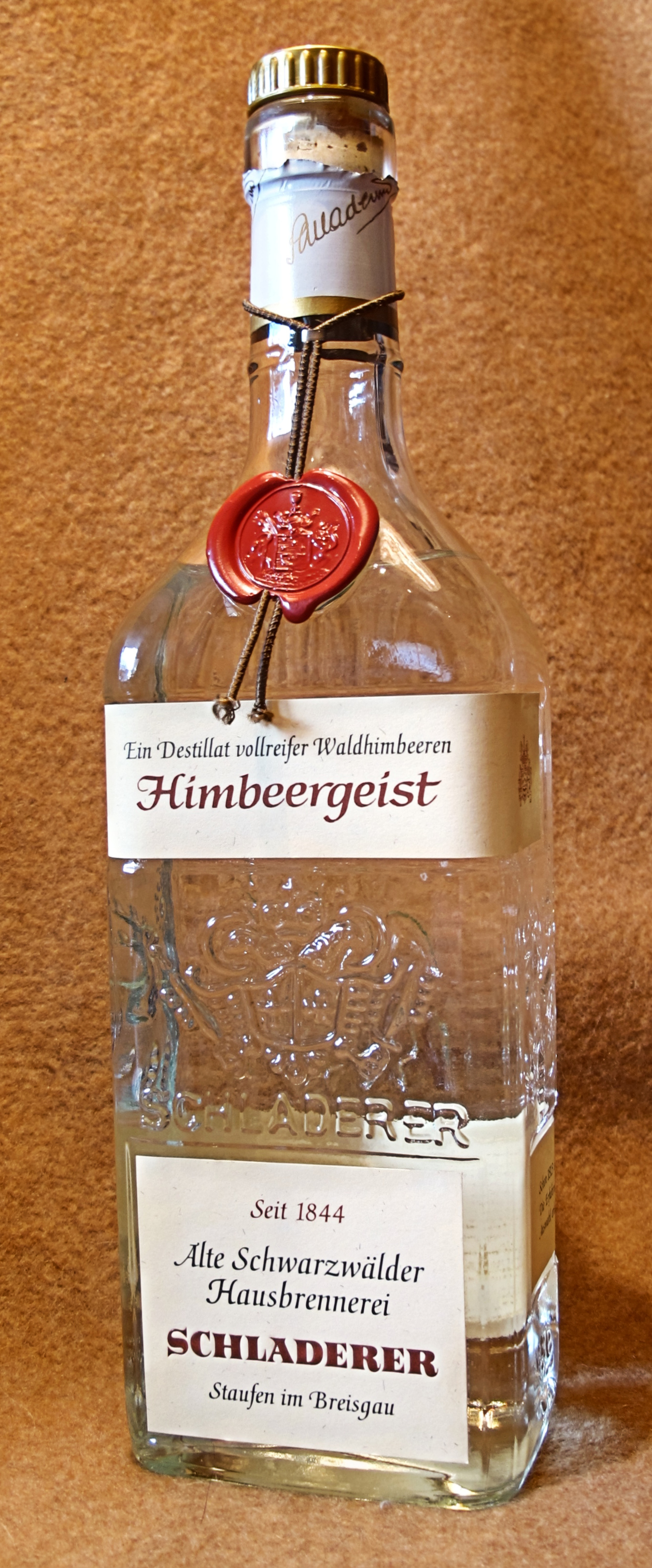
Himbeergeist made from wild raspberries in the Black Forest region of Germany

Himbeergeist (lit "raspberry spirit", also known as raspberry spirit obtained by maceration and distillation, eau de vie de framboise or simply framboise) is a geist (a type of eau de vie or Schnapps) made from raspberries. It is produced mainly in Germany and the Alsace region of France.

Rather than distilling a fermented mash of fresh fruit into liquor, like a fruit brandy (Obstler in German), Himbeergeist is made as an infusion. Raspberries have a low sugar content that can only produce a limited amount of alcohol, so Himbeergeist is created by macerating fresh berries in 96% pure neutral spirits. The mixture is then steeped for several weeks to draw out the raspberry essence, distilled, diluted with purified water, and bottled at 37.5% ABV or stronger. Producers may add a small amount of sugar to round off the final taste, but under EU law, this cannot exceed 10 grams of invert sugar per litre. Added colours and flavours are also not permitted.

It takes about 17 pounds (7.7 kg) of raspberries to produce one liter of Himbeergeist. It is traditionally served below room temperature, neat, in a fluted tulip glass.

== See also ==
- Brandy
