= Geist (liquor) =

Distilled beverage

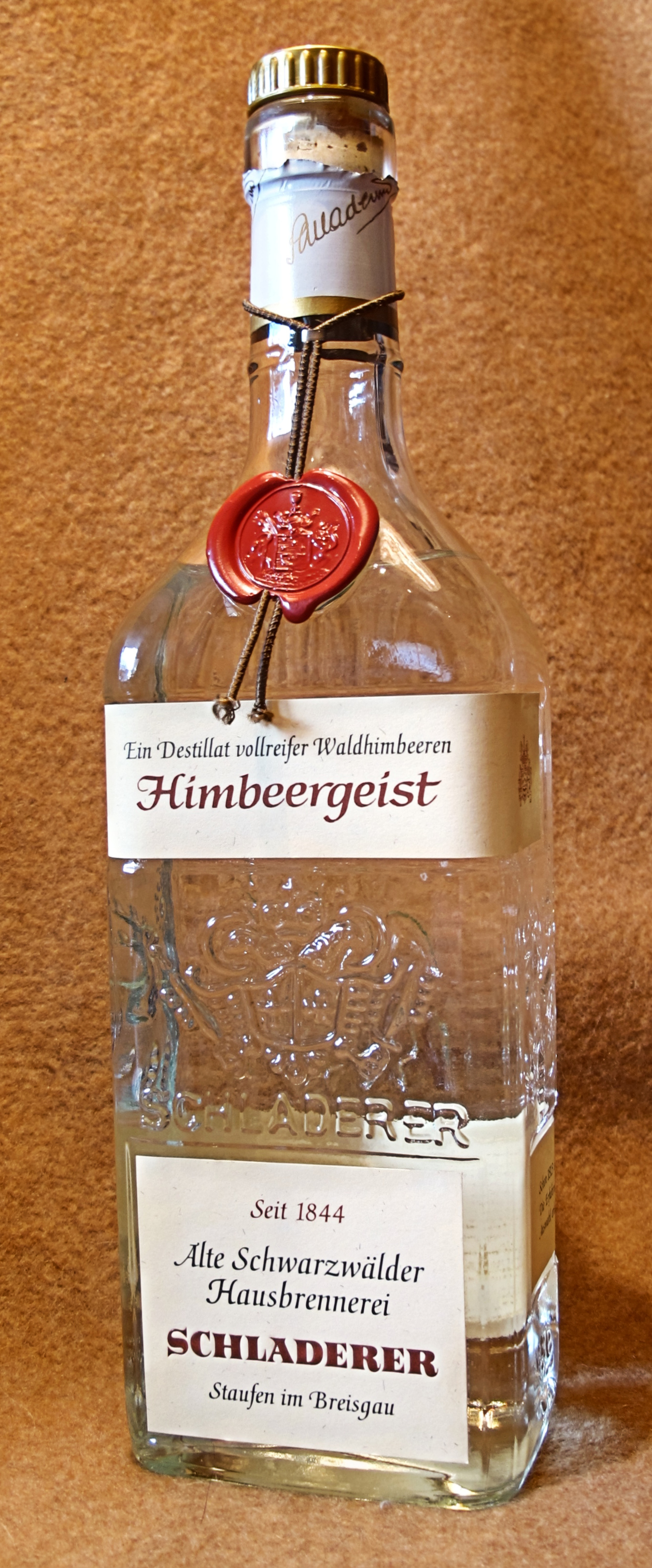
Himbeergeist, or raspberry spirit obtained by maceration and distillation

Geist (German for 'spirit', pl. "Geister") is a distilled beverage obtained by maceration of unfermented fruit or other raw materials in neutral spirits, followed by distillation. This differs from fruit brandy, where the alcohol comes from fermenting the fruit's naturally occurring sugars. As such, geist can be made from a much wider range of materials, as it is not limited to fruits with sufficient fermentable sugars.

Geist can be produced from a single material (like Himbeergeist) or a combination of multiple ingredients.

Akvavit, most gins and white absinthes legally meet the description to be considered a geist, although they have more specific legal definitions.

== European Union ==
=== Geist ===
As per the EU regulations that define of spirit drinks, geist must be produced by maceration of unfermented fruits and berries or vegetables, nuts, other plant materials, such as herbs, rose petals, or mushrooms, in ethyl alcohol of agricultural origin, followed by distillation.

Geist must contain at least 37.5% alcohol by volume, it cannot contain added colours or flavours, and it may not contain more than 10 grams of sweetening products per litre (expressed as invert sugar).

=== Spirit obtained by maceration and distillation ===
Geist can also be named "Spirit obtained by maceration and distillation" only if it has been produced from the following fruits, berries or nuts:

- chokeberry
- black chokeberry
- chestnut
- citrus fruits
- hazelnut
- crowberry
- strawberry
- sea-buckthorn
- hollyberry
- cornel cherry or cornelian cherry
- walnut
- banana
- myrtle
- prickly pear
- passion fruit
- bird cherry
- sloe
- blackcurrant
- white currant
- redcurrant
- gooseberry
- rosehip
- arctic bramble
- cloudberry
- blackberry
- raspberry
- elderberry
- rowanberry
- sorb apple
- wild service tree
- ambarella
- hog plum
- high bush blueberry
- wild cranberry
- bilberry/blueberry
- cowberry

Elderberry geist can therefore be named "Elderberry spirit obtained by maceration and distillation" but elderflower geist cannot.

== See also ==
- Eau de vie
- Liquor
- List of alcoholic drinks
