= Pálenka =

Czech and Slovak distilled alcohol, especially fruit brandy

In the Czech Republic and Slovakia, pálenka is any kind of distilled beverage but especially fruit brandy. The term is often used generically for all kinds of liquors, including vodka, gin and borovička. The word derives from the Slavic verb *paliti (Czech: pálit, Slovak: páliť) 'to burn; to distill'.

Similar products exist in Hungary under the name pálinka and in Romania under the name palincă. The product is also often compared to Rakia, a spirit found throughout much of the Balkans.

Most traditional types of pálenka in Moravia and Slovakia are slivovica (plum spirit), ražná (grain spirit), borovička (a special kind of liquor distilled from the berries of Juniperus communis), hruškovica (pear spirit), jablkovica (apple spirit). Popular are also čerešňovica (cherry spirit) and marhuľovica (apricot spirit). Very distinctive among pálenkas are the ones distilled from fermented forest berries, including raspberries, blueberries, wild black thorn (planá trnka) and cranberries. Drienkovica (a spirit distilled from Cornelian cherries (Cornus mas) was popularized by the former Slovak president Rudolf Schuster.

Less common now but historically popular distillates include jeřabinka (made from Rowan berries) and kontušovka (made from vodka, and flavoured with star anise and other spices, and sweetened with honey). The latter was quite popular prior to the First World War, and features prominently in the works of Jaroslav Hašek, Petr Bezruč and Sigmund Freud.

It was the title of a 2014 award-winning novel by Matěj Hořava, about a Czech-speaking minority community in a village in Romania in Banat.

== See also ==
- Pálinka, Hungarian fruit spirit similar to pálenka
- Rakia, fruit brandy common throughout Southeastern Europe
- Slivovitz, popular plum brandy
- Țuică, Romanian plum spirit
