= Cold brew =

Culinary process

Cold brew is the culinary process of steeping raw organic materials – such as coffee beans, tea leaves, fruit, or botanicals – in cold or room-temperature water for an extended period. The method relies on time rather than thermal energy to extract flavour, oils, and active chemical compounds. The steeping process typically lasts between 4 and 24 hours, depending on the density of the raw material.

== Chemical extraction ==
The absence of heat fundamentally alters the chemical extraction profile compared to traditional thermal brewing. At temperatures between 4 and 6 °C, the solubility rates of various botanical compounds change. Bitter catechins and caffeine extract significantly more slowly in cold water, while amino acids such as L-theanine release freely. This results in a beverage with lower titratable acidity and reduced astringency.

== Applications ==
=== Coffee ===
Cold brew coffee involves steeping coarsely ground beans to produce a dense concentrate. The lower temperature restricts the extraction of certain acidic oils found in hot-brewed coffee.

=== Tea ===
Cold brew tea uses loose leaves and functions primarily as a light table infusion. The cold water extraction preserves volatile essential oils and limits tannic astringency.

=== Mixology ===
Beverage professionals use cold extraction for fruit, citrus peel, and herbs to develop non-alcoholic bases, cold-process syrups, and house liqueurs. Avoiding thermal exposure prevents fresh ingredients from developing stewed characteristics and protects delicate aromatics.

== See also ==
- Maceration (food)
- Steeping
