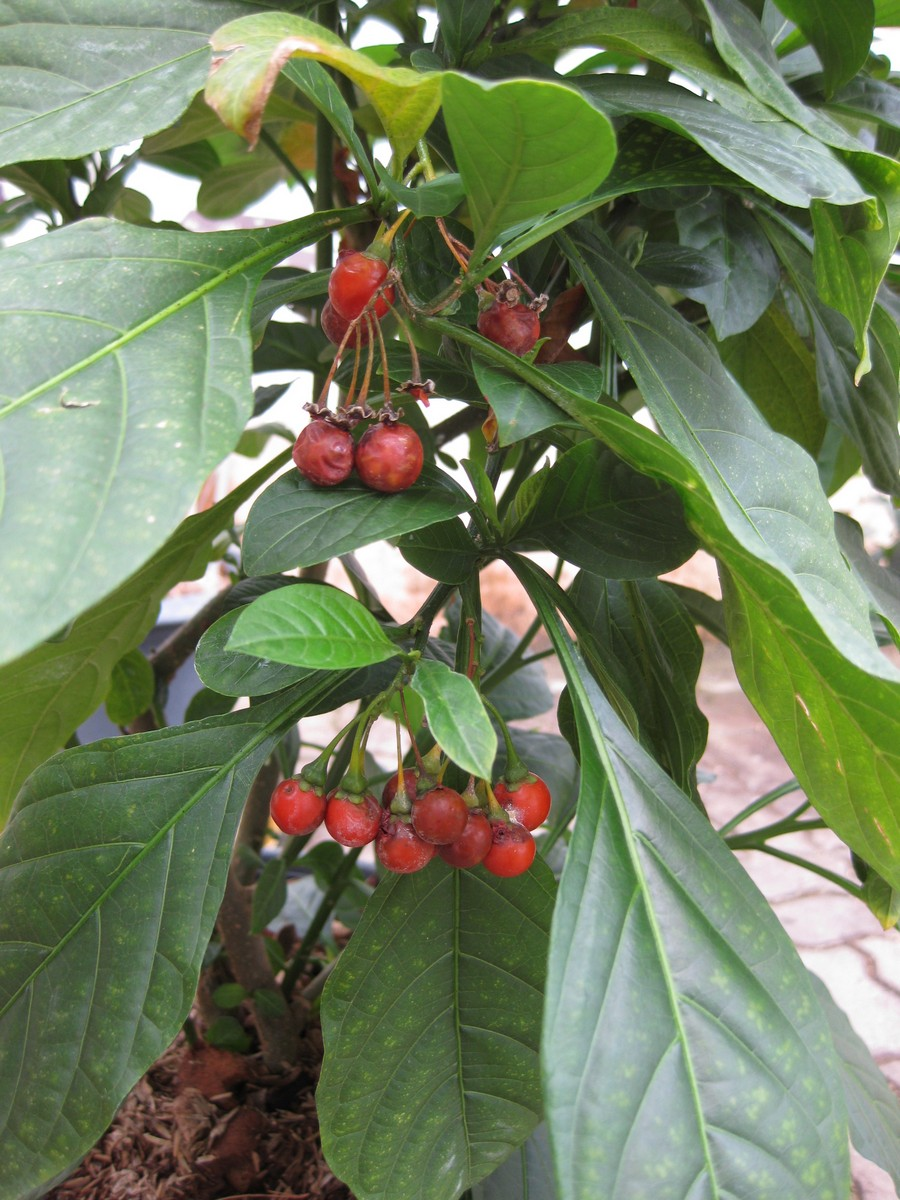
- Solanum Spirale fruit and leaves

Scientific classification
- Kingdom: Plantae
- Clade: Tracheophytes
- Clade: Angiosperms
- Clade: Eudicots
- Clade: Asterids
- Order: Solanales
- Family: Solanaceae
- Genus: Solanum
- Species: S. spirale

Binomial name
- Solanum spirale Roxb.

Synonyms
- Solanum callium C.T.White ex R.J.F.Hend.

= Solanum spirale =

Species of shrub

Solanum spirale is a small fruiting shrub in the family Solanaceae, present in mid-elevation (500 to 1,900 m) paleotropical areas, in Southern China, India, Burma, Thailand, Laos, Vietnam, Indonesia and Australia (Queensland).

It is widely cultivated in dooryard gardens in India, Thailand, and Laos and used for:

- food (cooked young leaves, raw or cooked berries)
- medicine (roots used as a narcotic and diuretic in Assam; bark macerate used as a febrifuge in Laos).

== Conservation status ==
In Queensland, Australia this species is listed as "Vulnerable" under the Nature Conservation Act 1992 under the synonym Solanum callium which is based on a different type specimen but the same species.
