= Fruit brandy =

Distilled beverage

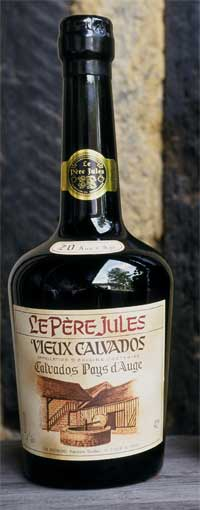
A bottle of Calvados, a French fruit spirit made from apples

Fruit brandy (or fruit spirit) is a distilled beverage produced from mash, juice, wine or edible fruit residues. The term covers a broad class of spirits produced across the world, excluding beverages made from grapes, which are referred to as plain brandy (when made by distillation of wine) or pomace brandy (when made directly from grape pomace). Apples, pears, apricots, plums and cherries are the most commonly used fruits.

== Definition ==
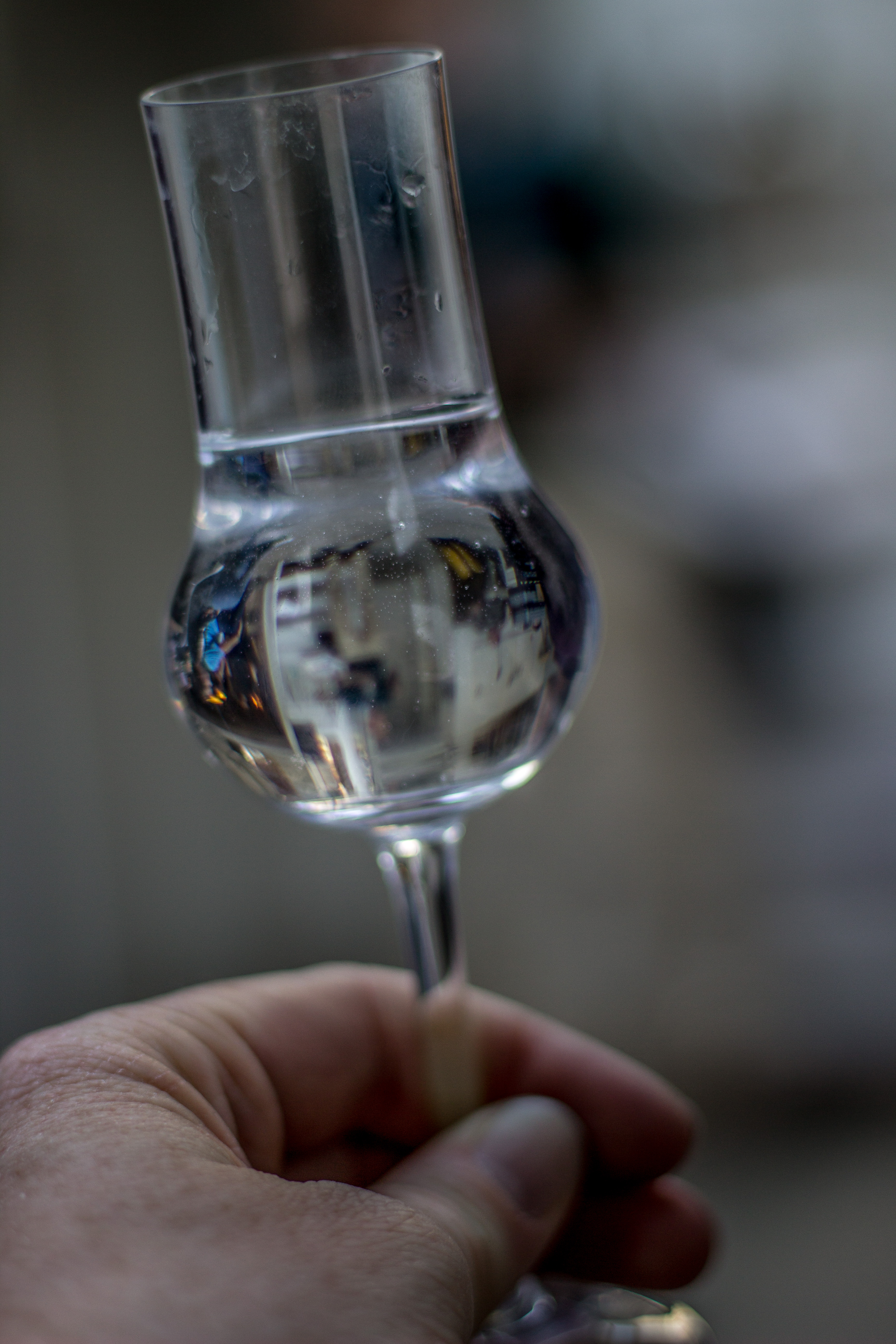
A fruit brandy in a traditional nosing glass

According to a legal definition in the United States, a "fruit brandy" is distilled "solely from the fermented juice or mash of whole, sound, ripe fruit, or from standard grape, citrus, or other fruit wine, with or without the addition of not more than 20 percent by weight of the pomace of such juice or wine, or 30 percent by volume of the lees of such wine, or both."

In British usage, "fruit brandy" may refer to liqueurs obtained by maceration of whole fruits, juice or flavoring in a distilled beverage, and such liqueurs are legally labeled as cherry brandy, apricot brandy etc. all across the European Union. Such beverages are used similarly to cordials, and as an ingredient in cocktails and cakes.

Cider brandy is defined in EC law as a distinct cask-aged product produced in the UK, distilled from cider made by fermenting traditional cider apple varieties. This includes "Somerset Cider Brandy", typically sold at 42% ABV, which is specifically protected as a Geographical Indication (GI) within the United Kingdom.

=== Fruit spirit ===
In the European Union, spirits distilled from fruit other than grapes may not be labeled as "fruit brandy". The legal English denomination is fruit spirit, which is "produced exclusively by the alcoholic fermentation and distillation of fleshy fruit or must of such fruit, berries or vegetables, with or without stones".

A large number of European fruit spirits have a protected designation of origin and are labeled with their respective protected names rather than "fruit spirit" (e.g., "apricot spirit"). Fruit spirit, often colourless, usually contains 40% to 45% ABV (80 to 90 US proof). Fruit spirit is customarily drunk chilled or over ice, but is occasionally mixed. Fruit spirits obtained by distillation are often referred to by the French term eau de vie. Cider spirit and perry spirit (fruit spirit distilled from cider or perry) form a separate legal category. Some fruit spirits may be labeled with alternative names, such as kirsch (cherry spirit) or slivovitz (plum spirit), regardless of their country of origin.

== Types ==
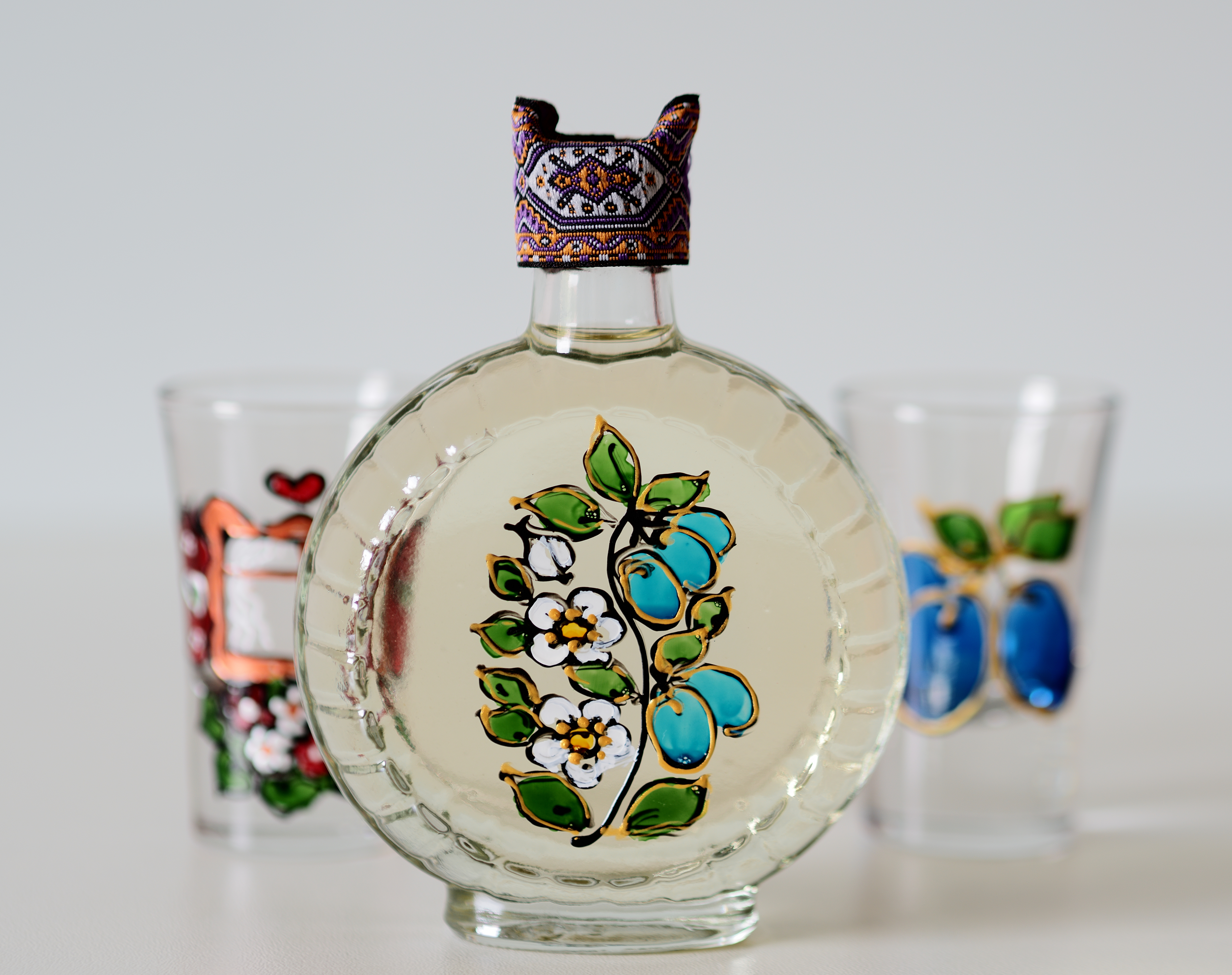
Slivovitz, a plum brandy common in Central, Eastern, and Southeastern Europe.

Including some of the above, there are about 80 different kinds of fruit spirits in the European Union, registered with protected designations of origin from Germany, France, Italy, Portugal, Luxembourg, Austria, Hungary, Slovakia, Bulgaria, Romania and Spain. Most of these fruit spirits are named after their region of origin and base ingredients. For example: Schwarzwälder Kirschwasser (cherry spirit of the Black Forest), Framboise d'Alsace (raspberry of Alsace), Aprikot dell'Alto Adige (apricot of South Tyrol), etc. They are often regulated more strictly than generic fruit spirits: in addition to limiting their region of origin, restrictions may include fruit variants, mashing and fermenting technology, distilling apparatus, barrel aging, etc.

Among the better-known fruit spirits are:

- Applejack is an American apple spirit made from the distillation of hard cider. It was once made by fractional freezing, which would disqualify it as a proper brandy.
- Brinjevec is a Slovenian spirit distilled from ground and fermented juniper berries.
- Buchu is a South African spirit flavoured with extracts from Agathosma species.
- Calvados is an apple spirit from the French region of Lower Normandy.
- Coconut brandy is actually made from the sap of palmyra palm flowers.
- Damassine brandy is made with the prune fruit of the Damassinier tree in the Jura Mountains of Switzerland.
- Eau de vie is a French term for colorless fruit spirit. This term is also applied to grape-based brandy other than Armagnac and Cognac.
- Himbeergeist is a raspberry-based spirit produced mainly in Germany and the Alsace region of France as an infusion of macerated fruit in neutral spirit which is then distilled. While not a true fruit brandy (its correct denomination is Geist), it is typically referred to as a form of Schnaps.
- Kirschwasser is a fruit spirit made from cherries.
- Kukumakranka is a South African spirit flavored with the fruit of the Kukumakranka plant.
- Marpha is a Nepalese fruit brandy produced in the Himalayan region of Mustang district.
- Obstler is a German word for fruit spirit (Schnaps), often called Schnapps in English.
- Pálenka or "Pálené" is a common traditional description for Slovak or Czech spirit. It must be distilled from wild or domestic fruits from Slovakia or the Czech Republic.
- Pálinka is a traditional Hungarian fruit spirit. It can only be made with fruits from Hungary, such as plums, apricots, peaches, elderberries, pears, apples, or cherries.
- Poire Williams is made from the Williams pear, also known as the Bartlett pear.
- Rakia is a type of fruit spirit produced in Albania, Bosnia and Herzegovina, Bulgaria, Croatia, North Macedonia, Montenegro, and Serbia: it may be made from plums, apples, quinces, pears, apricots, cherries, mulberries, or grapes.
- Slivovitz is a transparent to yellow-colored plum spirit produced in Bosnia and Herzegovina, Bulgaria, Croatia, Czech Republic, Macedonia, Poland, Serbia, Slovakia, and Slovenia.
- Somerset Cider Brandy is an apple brandy which dates back to 1678 and which obtained European protected status in 2011.
- Țuică, also known as horincă or turţ, is a clear Romanian plum spirit. Other Romanian fruit spirits, often distilled from apples, pears, apricots, mulberries, peaches, quinces, or mixtures of these, are colloquially known as Rachiu.

== Health issues ==
=== Moonshine ===
Although methanol is not produced in toxic amounts by fermentation of sugars from grain starches, it is a major occurrence in fruit spirits. Methanol in fruit spirits forms mainly from pectins during fermentation and mash storage. Manufacturing controls are used to mitigate and monitor methanol levels. However, in modern times, reducing methanol with the absorption of a molecular sieve is a practical method for production. Which is why the spirits produced are safe for the consumer, respecting the legal limits imposed for methanol.

According to a population-level risk assessment, unregistered fruit brandies in particular can contain high concentrations of methanol. These unregistered beverages are sold illegally and are the cause of many accounts of methanol poisoning worldwide.

== See also ==
- Aperitif
- Cordial
- Whisky
