= Burrow Hill Cider Farm =

Cider manufacturer in Somerset, England

Coordinates: 50°58′35″N 2°50′03″W

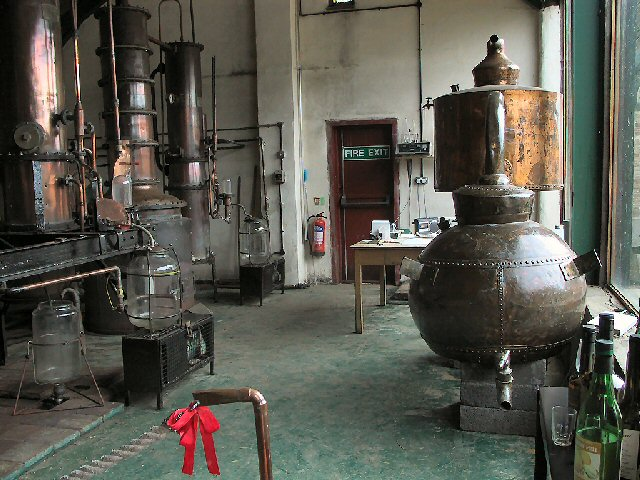
Cider Brandy Still

Burrow Hill Cider Farm is a cider farm in Somerset, England at the base of Burrow Hill overlooking the Somerset Levels.

It has views of most of South Somerset on clear days. The cider is made in traditional vats and uses age old traditional methods of production. Every October is "Apple Day" when the apples are harvested from locally owned orchards.

In 2003 the company won the NFU Great British Food Award.

== Cider Bus ==
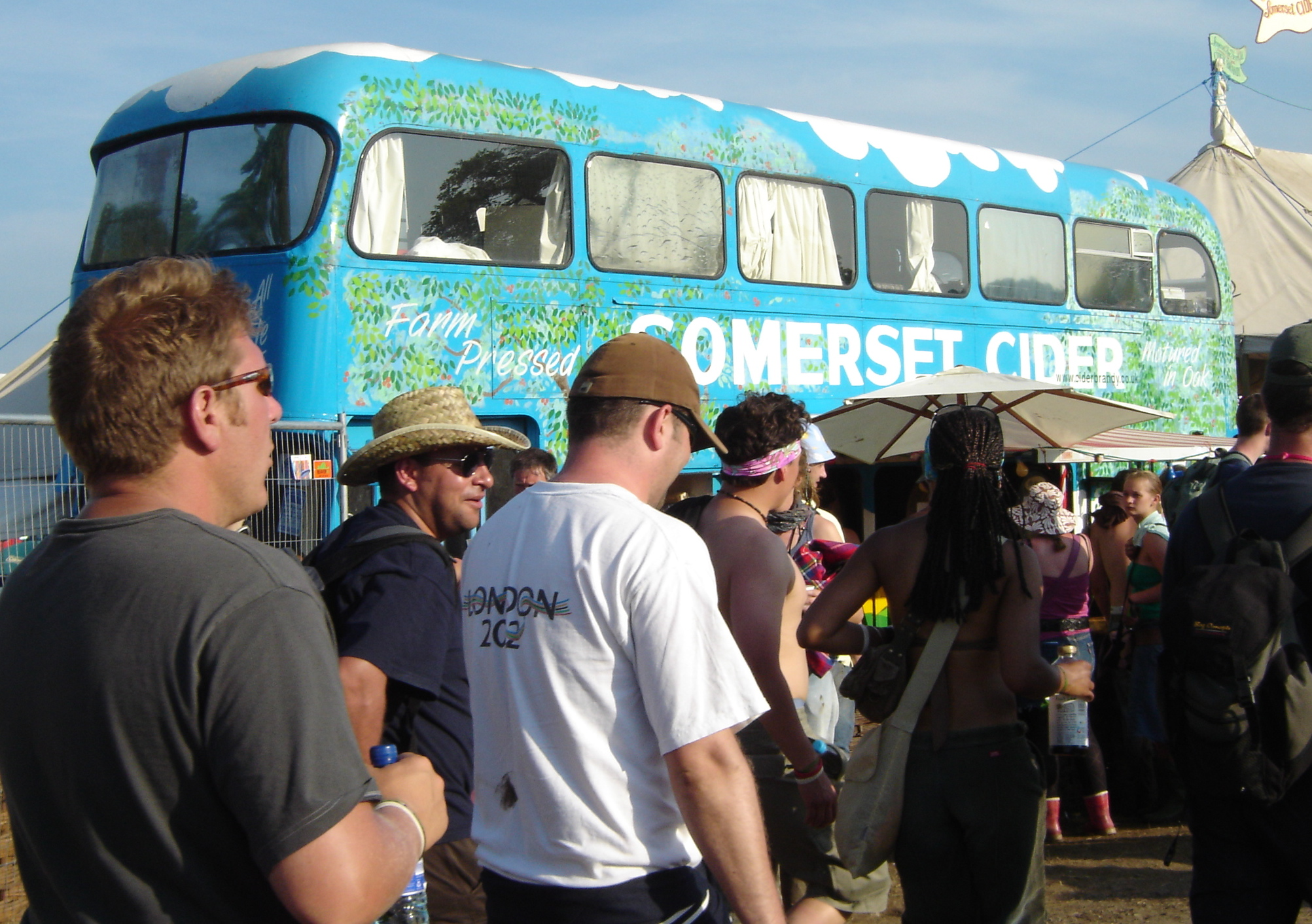
Burrow Hill's "cider bus" in 2005

Burrow Hill Cider has a double-decker 'Cider Bus' at the Glastonbury Festival selling a variety of cider-based drinks, including Hot Spiced Cider. The Cider Bus has been selling at Glastonbury since the first festival in 1970 and has become a mainstay of the festival.

== Somerset Cider Brandy ==
Somerset Cider Brandy is an apple brandy that has been in written records as far back as 1678. A modern version was first produced by Burrow Hill in 1987. It reportedly became the first legal distillery in Somerset for 150 years, when, in 1989, the farm received the first full cider-distilling licence ever issued by the UK's HM Customs and Excise.

== In popular culture ==
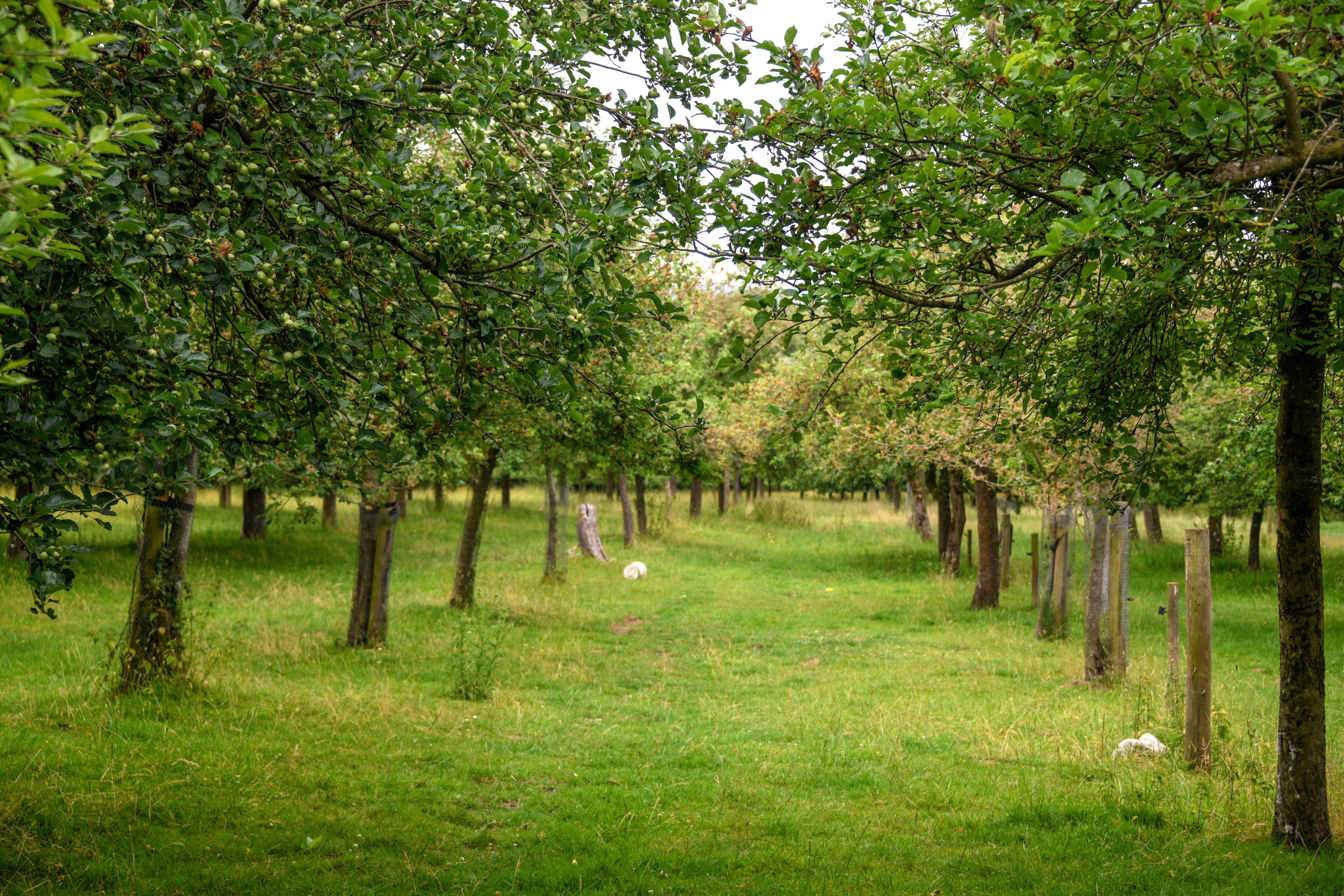
Filming location for Wanda's orchard

Filming for Wanda's apple orchard scene for the 2022 Marvel film Doctor Strange in the Multiverse of Madness occurred at the farm.
