= Acerum =

Maple syrup brandy from Quebec

Acerum is maple eau de vie (brandy) made in Quebec, Canada, following the specifications of Canada's the Union of Maple Spirits Distillers (UDSÉ). Acerum comes from the Latin words “acer” meaning maple and the English word “rum”. Maple syrup is fermented and distilled.

== History ==
In the 1970s, distillers began to produce alcohol from maple syrup. Although some distilled alcohol tests were then carried out in university laboratories, it was not until the 1990s that certain maple syrup producers began to produce a wine based on this sweet resource, which was initially called Acer. One of the first producers of Acerum was The Domaine Acer, based in Témiscouata, Quebec. When Vallier Robert took the reins of his family maple business in 1990, he quickly saw the potential to make alcohol. In 1996, the maple farmer was granted the first licence to produce artisanal maple-based alcoholic beverages. He began creating several varieties of maple sap wine, including dry, sparkling and dessert wines.

During the same period, some distilleries began to market maple eau-de-vie, but it was not until December 2017 that the name Acerum appeared for the first time for a maple eau-de-vie.

== Area of production ==
As defined by the specifications of the UDSÉ, Acerum must be entirely manufactured in the province of Quebec, in Canada, with maple syrup, maple concentrate, or maple sap from Quebec maples.

== See also ==
- Rum
- Tequila
- Mead
