= Coconut brandy =

Distilled spirit

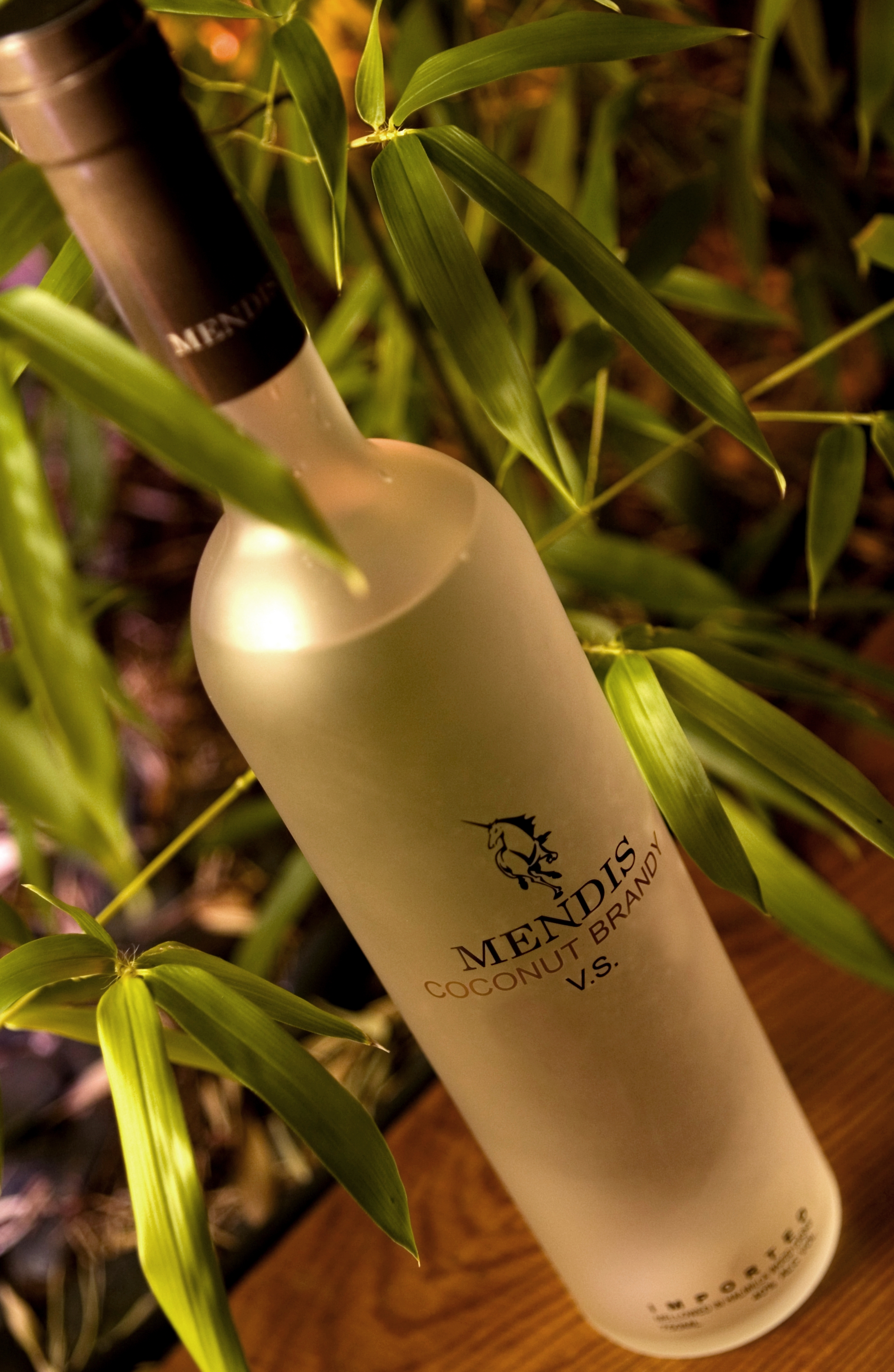
- Type: Fruit brandy
- Manufacturer: Mendis Brandy
- Introduced: 2009
- Alcohol by volume: 40.0%
- Proof (US): 80

Coconut brandy is a clear distilled spirit produced from borassus flower nectar and matured in wood casks. The spirit is produced by Mendis Brandy, a Georgia, U.S.-based company. The spirit is not made with coconuts.

== Production ==
Coconut brandy is produced from the sap ("toddy") of borassus flowers that are extracted by a process called tapping and paring. The toddy is sourced from the borassus palm in Sri Lanka, where the borassus palm is tapped and pared for a total of 8 months, beginning in the first week of April and ending the second week of December each year.

The toddy's main constituent is sucrose, and it naturally ferments in the wood casks it is brought to the distillery in. Under normal conditions during toddy collection this sucrose will ferment without aid, due to naturally occurring yeast.

At the distillery, the fermented toddy is transferred into wood storing vats where it is filtered. It is then pumped into the distillation house where the distiller uses both a pot still and a patent still to distill different batches of toddy. the Toddy is double distilled in the French pot still and single distilled in the patent still by a continuous distillation process. During distillation, the distillate of toddy is placed in wooden holding vats which are transferred to warehouses for maturation.

Oak casks and hamlilla wood casks are used to age the coconut brandy. Coconut brandy bottled after two years labelled as a V.S., while brandy labelled X.O. has a minimum of 10 years maturation, which emulates cognac grades.
