= Țuică =

Traditional Romanian spirit

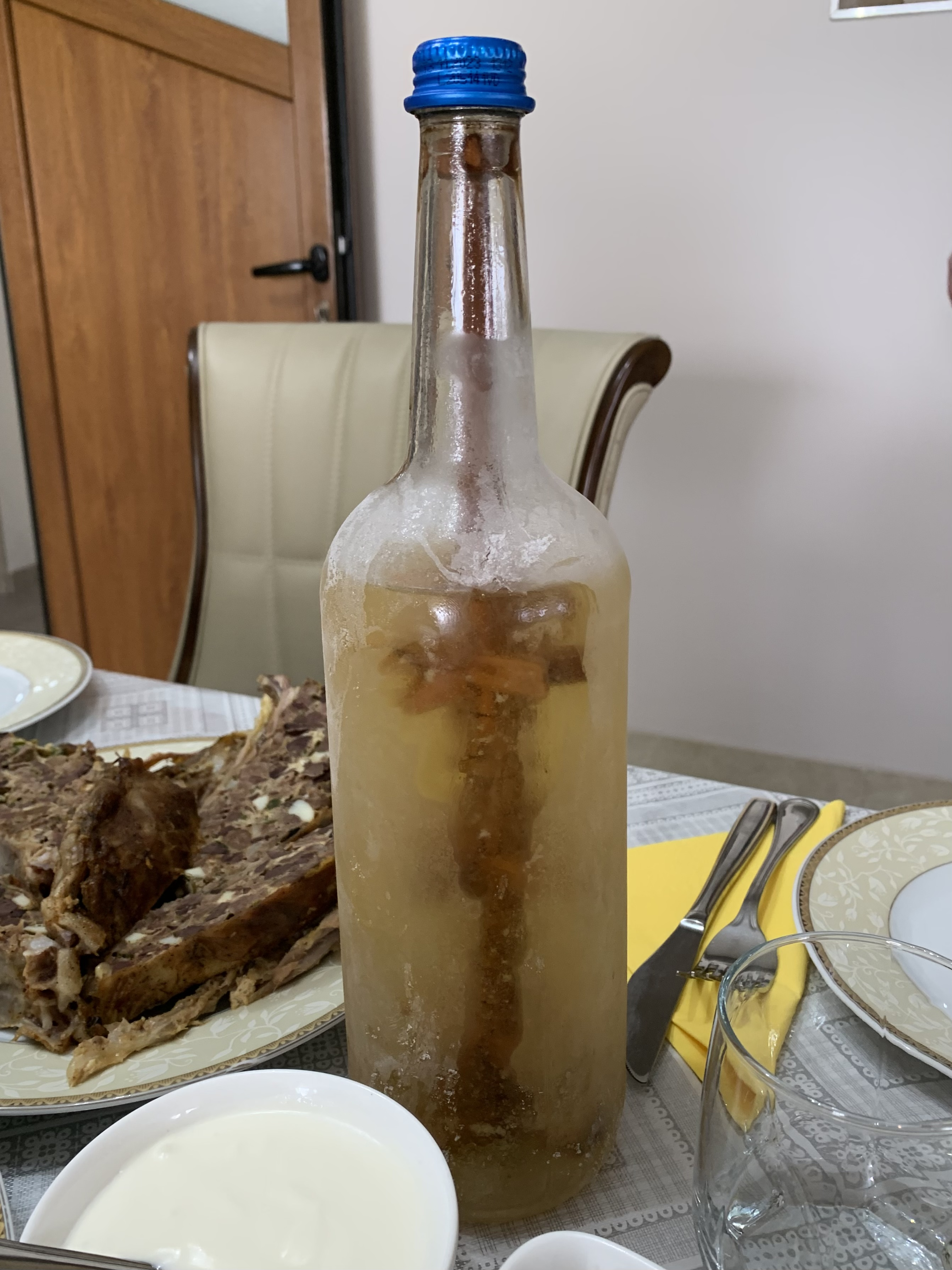
A bottle of home-produced Țuică in Sighetu Marmației served alongside other Easter feasts. Noted an interlocking wooden stick inside of the bottle, typical of Maramureș region

Țuică (Romanian pronunciation: [ˈt͡sujkə]) is a traditional Romanian spirit that contains ~ 24–86% alcohol by volume (usually 40–55%), prepared only from plums. Other spirits that are produced from other fruit or from a cereal grain are called "rachiu" or "rachie". Țuică is also the foundational element for creating the traditional Romanian vinars from different spirited fruits. In 2013, Romania produced 1.3 million hectolitres (34 million US gallons) of țuică.

It is considered Romania's national drink.

== Preparation ==
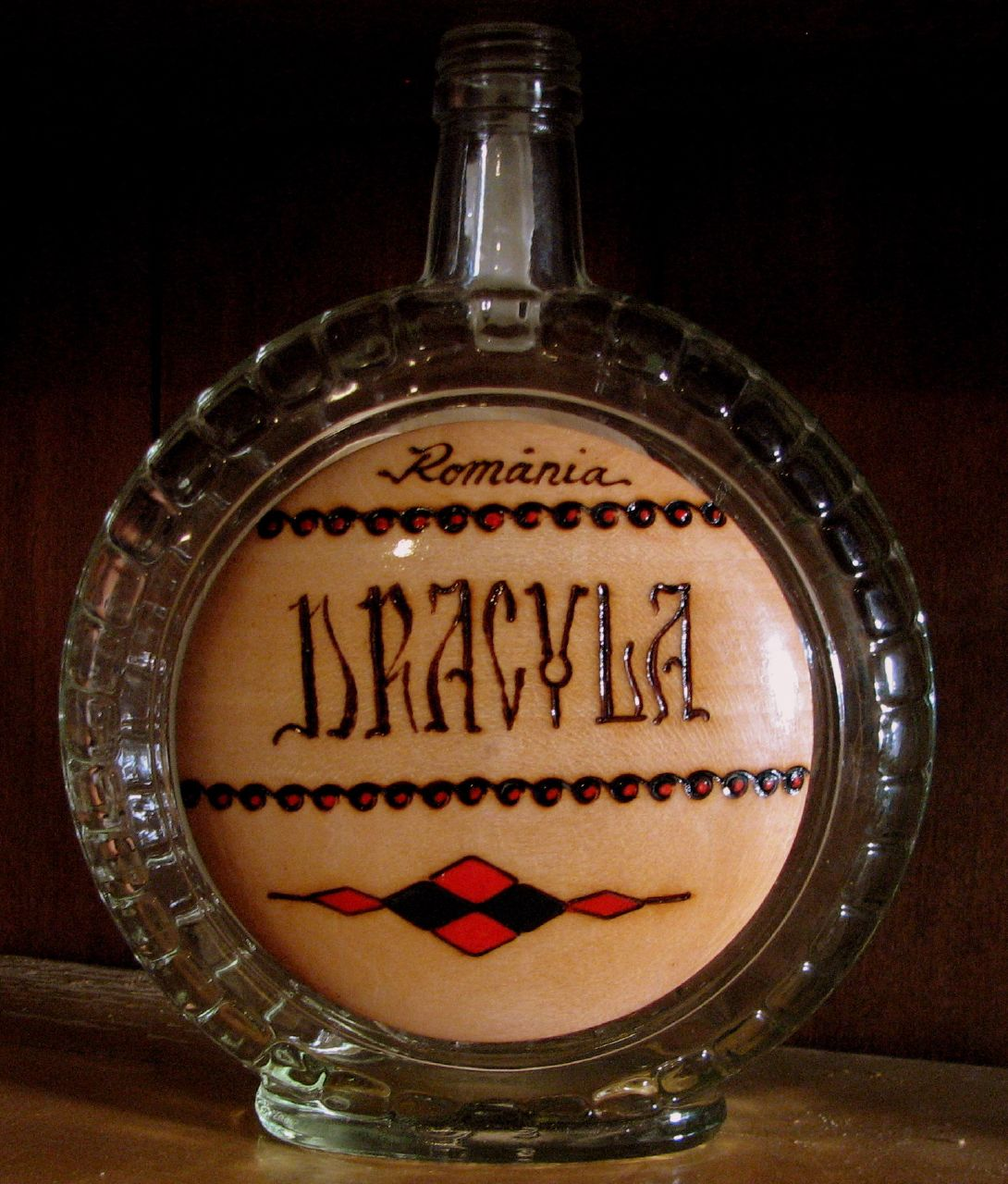
Bottled Țuică

Traditionally, țuică is prepared from early summer (after winemaking is complete). The plums must be left for fermentation (macerare) for 6–8 weeks, in large barrels (butoaie or căldări or putini). Plums are the most commonly used and widely marketed fruit in this context. Historically, and even in the present day, their consumption has been more prevalent in urban areas, where they are often used to make jams, kompot, or eaten fresh. However, in rural towns and villages, where economic constraints play a significant role, plums have often been considered a high-standard fruit, making them a less common choice for distillation.

Instead, rural communities have traditionally turned to more accessible and cost-effective alternatives, such as mulberries (Morus species) and mirabelle plums, which are more readily available and affordable. Another widely used resource is the byproduct of winemaking: the leftover grape pomace. After the grapes are pressed for wine production, the remaining solids—skins, seeds, and pulp—are left inside the wine cask throughout the winter, where they continue to ferment and absorb alcohol from the surrounding liquid. This process enhances their flavor and extends their usability, reflecting a long-standing tradition of resourcefulness in winemaking regions.

According to both tradition and Romanian standards (SR), distillation must be done in a copper still (cazan, pictures at ), using a traditional fire source (generally wood, but also charcoal).

The temperature is controlled traditionally by interpreting the sounds that the still makes and by tasting the brew at different points in the process. Usually, this process results in two grades of țuică:

- normal: distilled once, the last to come from the still; between 24–40% alcohol.
- very strong: distilled twice, generally a quarter of the production, and the first to come out of the still; about 50–65% alcohol by volume, stronger than palinka; called pălincă de prune, fățată, întoarsă, or horincă depending on the region; the most famous țuică served before a meal; in rural regions, it is customary to serve this drink to a guest.

After distillation, țuică may be left to age between six months and ten years in mulberry aging barrels (the result is pearlescent yellow, has a strong aroma, and is known as "old țuică", țuică bătrână), or it may be consumed immediately ("fresh țuică", țuică proaspătă). The people preparing țuică are sometimes referred to as țuicari, căzănari, or cazangii, but this varies according to geographical region. Mixed with water, țuică should never turn white or opaque. There are several different classifications of țuică based on aging duration, with varieties such as old, selected, superior, etc.

== Types and terminology ==
The term "țuică" is defined as a spirit made from plums, although it is also colloquially used to refer to all distilled beverages. Romanian law (Order No. 368/2008, published in Monitorul Oficial) standardises definitions and labelling for traditional Romanian spirits including țuică, horincă, turț and others. Țuică is described as an autochthonous product found only in Romania. The term "palincă" is a generic term for any type of fruit brandy, while "palincă de prune" refers specifically to plum brandy.

Țuică is prepared using traditional methods both for private consumption and for sale. Although this was illegal in the past, the government tolerated the practice due to the traditional character of the beverage. Some communities have acquired production licences and produce it legally. Home distillation in Romania is legal provided the distiller pays an excise tax and produces no more than 50 litres per year (13 US gal/a) per household.

The names "horincă" and "turț" are used in the regions of Maramureș and Oaș as synonyms for țuică. These terms are occasionally used in other areas of northern Transylvania. This is codified in the Romanian law "Order No. 368/2008 approving the Rules on the definition, description, presentation and labelling of traditional Romanian beverages".

A commercial famous presentation is "țuică cu fruct". This is a glass bottle of țuică containing a whole plum fruit. It is obtained by hanging empty bottles on trees in spring or early summer and growing the fruit inside the bottle.

Among geographically protected drink names is Țuică Zetea de Medieșu Aurit, registered as a fruit spirit under the GI scheme (originally registered with the EU on 21 June 2005; carried into the UK scheme on 31 December 2020).

== Consumption ==
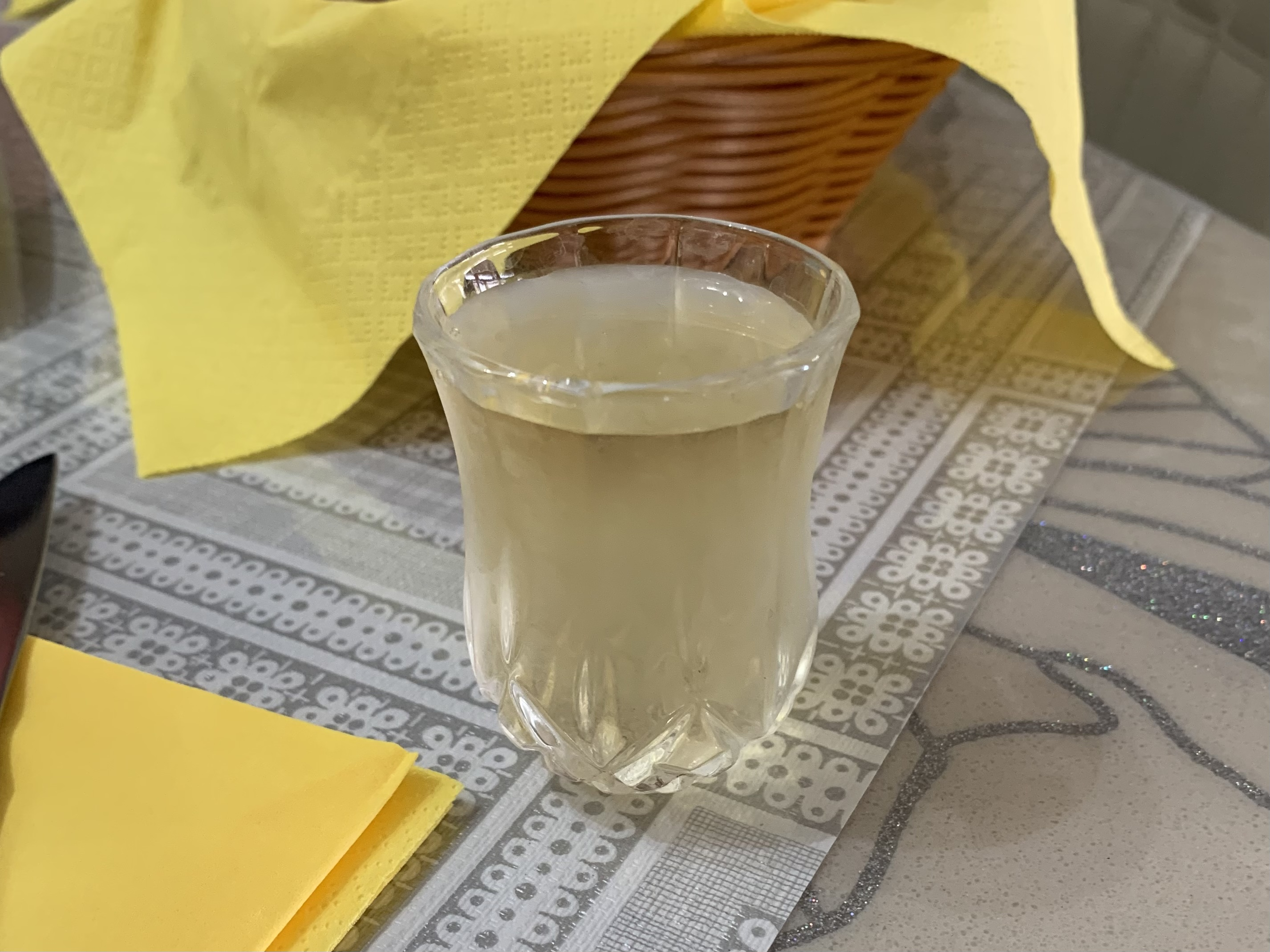
A shot glass of țuica in Sighetu Marmației, pictured here during Easter celebration

Normally, țuica is only consumed before the meal (traditionally every meal). In most cases, only a shot-sized amount is served, and it is generally sipped. The drink is also present in all traditional parties (agape) such as weddings, baptisms, hunting parties, harvest festivals, religious holidays, family reunions, and wakes. In most of rural Romania, țuică is the usual drink to hold a toast with, rather than wine. Usually it is drunk before a meal, as it increases appetite.

A modern portrayal of a modern village inhabitant almost always includes a bottle of țuică. Studies of Romanian fruit processing and rural economies describe plum distilling as closely associated with hill and Subcarpathian rural livelihoods and with forms of farm diversification, including marketing to urban consumers and visitors. For rural families producing țuică for their own consumption (not commercial) the output can amount between ~ 10 - 200 litres per family per year, as the plum tree is the most widely present tree in Romanian orchards (see also Agriculture in Romania). Academic studies also highlight the Subcarpathian region as a longstanding centre for plum use, where plums are widely valued for țuică and where the product has maintained a substantial commercial outlet beyond household consumption.

Țuică is sometimes used as part of a small remuneration package for favors or "daily work" (informal or between friends).

Romania is the largest plum producer in the European Union and among the top plum producers in the world. According to the Romanian Ministry of Agriculture, around 65,000 hectares (250 mi^{2}) are cultivated with plum trees, and 80% of production is transformed into țuică.
