= Pálinka =

Central European alcohol

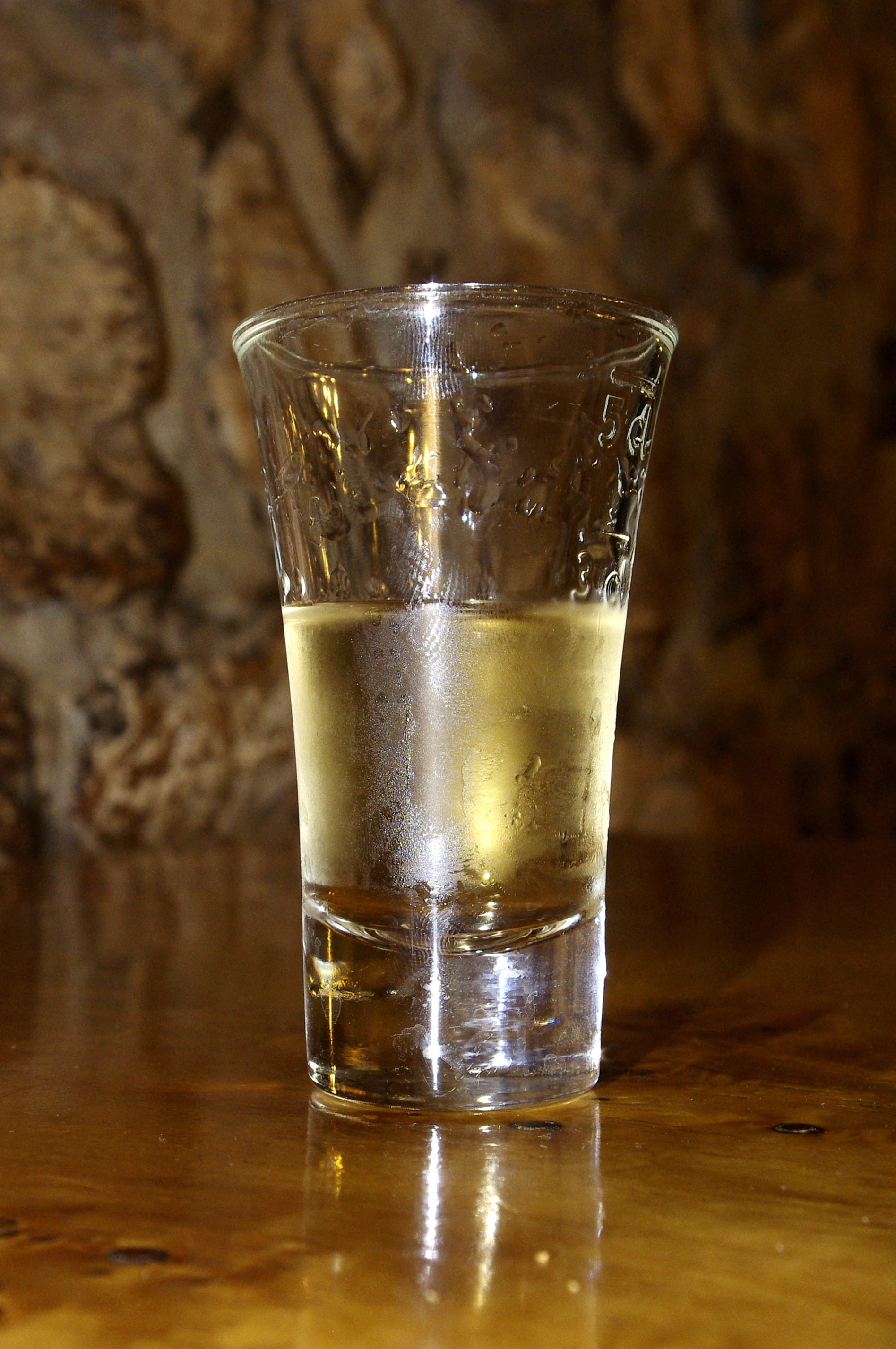
A glass of apricot pálinka

Pálinka (Hungarian pronunciation: [ˈpaːliŋkɒ]) is a traditional fruit spirit (or fruit brandy) with origins in medieval Hungary, known under several names. The earliest verifiable reference to pálinka dates back to 1332, when it was used as medicine in the Hungarian royal court. Protected as a geographical indication of the European Union, only fruit spirits mashed, distilled, matured and bottled in Hungary and similar apricot spirits from four provinces of Austria can be called "pálinka", while "Tótpálinka" refers to wheat-derived beverages. Törkölypálinka, a different product in the legal sense, is a similarly protected pomace spirit that is commonly included with pálinka. While pálinka may be made of any locally grown fruit, the most common ones are plums, apricots, apples, pears, and cherries.

A similar product exists in Romania (Transylvania) and Slovakia, regions that were once part of the Kingdom of Hungary. In the Czech Republic and Slovakia it is known as pálenka, in Italy and Greece under the name palincă. In Turkey it is known as boğma.

== Etymology ==
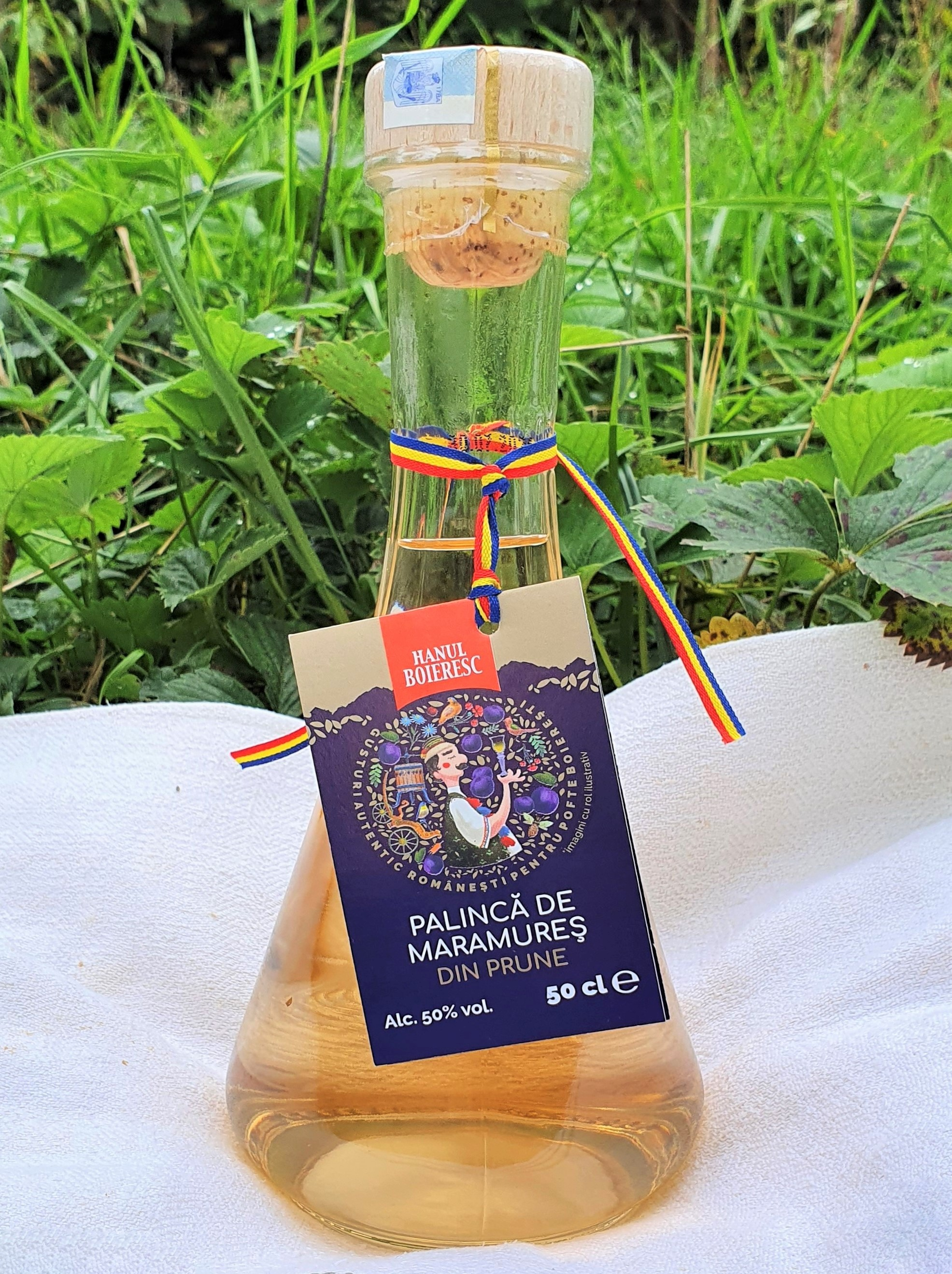
Romanian palincă from Maramureș

Pálinka was known by the old Hungarian name babinka, while the word pálinka was adopted into the Hungarian language in the 17th century. The words pálinka (in Hungarian), pálenka (Czech and Slovak), and pălincă (Romanian) derive from the Slavonic stem paliti, "to burn, to distill". In Hungarian, the word Tótpálinka (literally 'Slavic pálinka') was used to refer to alcoholic drinks derived from wheat.

The Hungarian name stampedli derives from German Stamperl.

== Legal definitions ==
The production of Hungarian pálinka is regulated by local law LXXIII of 2008, often referred to as "pálinka law", which is based on the regulation of generic fruit spirits of the European Union. An alcoholic beverage may be called pálinka if:

1. it is fermented exclusively from fruit (excluding concentrates and dried fruits) grown in Hungary, and free of additional ingredients;
2. it is grown, distilled and bottled in Hungary; and
3. it is not rectified higher than 86% and is bottled with at least 37.5% ABV.

While pálinka is traditionally made from a mash of ripe fruit, the law does not control the addition of non-concentrated fruit juice, and explicitly allows the use of fruit pulp. Dried fruits are excluded from the mash only, and may be used in the aging process.

As a consequence of this regulation, a whole family of popular Hungarian products were rebranded as szeszes ital (spirit drinks). Traditional pálinkas mixed with honey were also rebranded as szeszes ital (or liqueur if the sugar content exceeded the required limit), even if there were no unorthodox steps in the process of distillation. Most of the brands re-categorized as spirit drinks, however, are cheap mixtures of flavorings, water, and rectified spirit.

In 2004, the European Union accepted pálinka as a Hungarian speciality, and hence its production is limited to Hungary and four provinces of Austria for pálinka made from apricots. This caused some confusion in neighbouring countries, as some claimed that producers of fruit spirits would have to pay a royalty to Hungary. This is, however, not the case. It is the brand "pálinka" that is protected by Hungarian and EU law, hence producers outside of Hungary are not allowed to use the brand "pálinka" for their products, but they are free to produce fruit spirits and sell them under different names. This is in spite of the drink being historically distilled in most of the former Kingdom of Hungary, much of which falls outside present-day Hungary.

In Austria, four provinces are allowed to label local apricot spirits as Barack Palinka (transliteration of Hungarian barackpálinka): Burgenland, Lower Austria, Styria, and Vienna. Unlike Hungarian pálinka, its Austrian counterpart may not be made with column stills, and in order to achieve a full character, careful slow distillation is required by law.

=== Geographical protection ===
Pálinka as a geographical indication (in other terms, a product with protected designation of origin or PDO) has been officially registered in the European Union since 2004.

While pálinka has PDO on its own, some regions of Hungary are especially suitable for the production of certain fruits, and pálinka of excellent quality has been produced in those regions for centuries. These local variations are protected as separate geographical indications and have their own well-detailed regulations. In order to use these protected names on the label, strict geographical and technical requirements must be met. A product not meeting the special requirements of gönci barackpálinka (apricot pálinka of Gönc) for example, cannot be labeled as such, not even if it is otherwise a legitimate apricot pálinka from Gönc. In Hungary, only these local variations are referred to as pálinka with protected designations of origin.

=== The eight palinkas with local PDO ===
Pálinkas with PDO include szatmári szilvapálinka (plum pálinka of Szatmár), kecskeméti barackpálinka (apricot pálinka of Kecskemét), szabolcsi almapálinka (apple pálinka of Szabolcs), békési szilvapálinka (plum pálinka of Békés), gönci barackpálinka (apricot pálinka of Gönc), újfehértói meggypálinka (sour cherry pálinka of Újfehértó), göcseji körtepálinka (pear pálinka of Göcsej), and pannonhalmi törkölypálinka (pomace pálinka of Pannonhalma).

== History ==
The earliest verifiable reference to pálinka dates back to 1332, in the court of King Charles Robert of Hungary. Queen Elizabeth, who suffered from arthritis, was treated with aqua vitae (water of life). This drink was called Aqua vitae reginae Hungariae, which means the "Hungarian Queens' water of life". At that time, it was not made from fruit, but from distilled wine infused with rosemary. Thus, the earliest distillates were primarily wine-based, preserved through distillation. Over time, other ingredients began to be used in the production of pálinka, including potatoes, fruits, and grains.

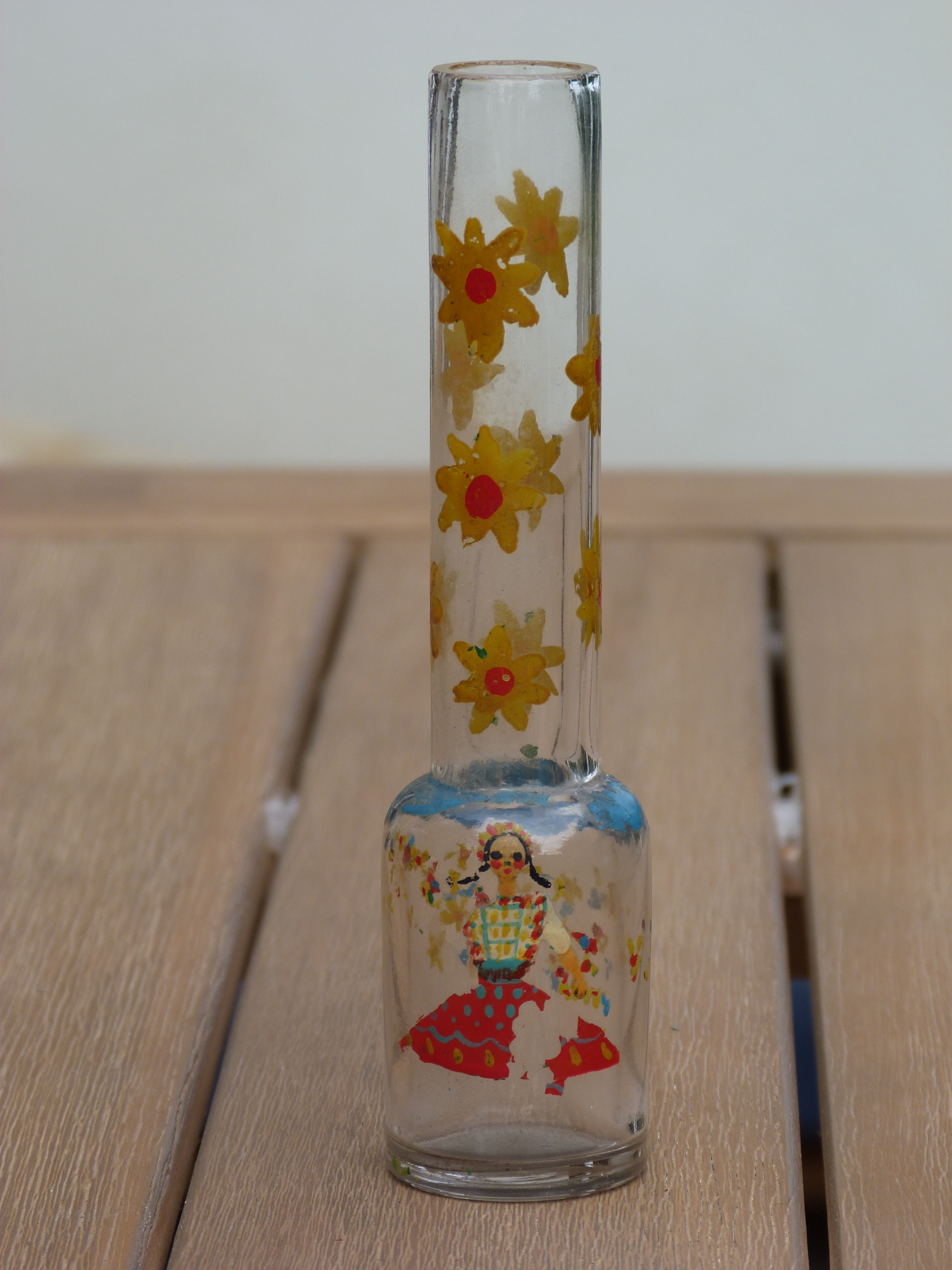
Hungarian pálinka bottle

In the 19th century, breweries and pálinka distilleries operated in tandem. Comenius described the equipment used to make pálinka in Orbis sensualium pictus ("The World in Pictures"), his famous book written for children in the Hungarian town of Sárospatak. Distilling itself was the right of landowners, and laws were introduced to prevent peasants from making pálinka at home. The use of wheat was banned, and distillation was forbidden on religious holidays. Despite this, the church still oversaw alcohol production. Records show that Cistercian monks in Heves County were brewing beer and distilling pálinka in 1715. The role of Jewish lenders and businessmen also grew with the production of alcohol, and Saint Michael was designated patron saint of distilling. Textbooks and publications also began to appear on the subject around this time.

The larger-scale production of distillates, pálinka and liqueurs from 1799 resulted in guidelines being drawn up for distillation, and the priority rights granted to landowners were made law. It was not long before a pálinka tax was introduced, and by 1850 distillation was a state monopoly. In 1920, there were 260 pálinka distilleries in Hungary, a figure that grew to 1,070 in 1970 before falling back down to 815 in 1982. In the meantime, various laws were introduced to restrict production, including prohibition during the short-lived Hungarian Soviet Republic in 1919 and the splitting of production 50-50 with the state from 1952 to 1970.

Illegal home distilling became popular in the 18th century when peasant breweries were shut down. The practice was fuelled by the desire to make use of fruit that had fallen from the tree and could not be eaten, coupled with the knowledge that making pálinka at home was much less expensive. Because the end product was often inferior, it was reserved for personal use and only offered to friends and guests.

The word pálinka became widespread in Hungary in the 17th century, but it still referred to distillates made from grain. The meaning was later transferred to fruit spirits while wheat distillates were referred to as crematura. Distillation became a privilege of the landlords, which led to the proliferation of home stills. Law forbade the use of bread-stuffs for distillation, hence the use of fruits. Private distilleries and factories started to appear towards the end of the eighteenth century, which led to legislation and to the introduction of a pálinka tax.

== Varieties ==
A popular saying in Hungary says: what can be used to prepare jam can also be used to produce pálinka. For a fruit to be suitable for jam production it has to contain some sugar. This saying suggests that pálinka can be made from a variety of fruit, and indeed it is made from most of the fruits available in Hungary.

The most common pálinkas are made from apricots, pears, and plums. Other fruits that are often used are sour cherries, apples, mulberries, and quince. Pálinka made from chestnuts or walnuts is also available.

- Kisüsti (literally 'small pot, cauldron') is a double-distilled pálinka made in a copper pot not exceeding a volume of 1000 litres.
- Érlelt ('aged') is a pálinka aged for at least three months in a wooden cask smaller than 1000 litres, or for at least six months in a wooden cask of 1000 litres or above.
- Ó ('old') is a pálinka aged for at least 12 months in a wooden cask smaller than 1000 litres, or for at least 24 months in a wooden cask of 1000 litres or above.
- Ágyas ('bedded') is a pálinka aged for at least three months together with fruit. The fruit can be of the same sort used to obtain the distillate or of another sort. To 100 liters of pálinka at least 10 kg of ripe or 5 kg of dried fruit must be added.
- Törköly (Pomace pálinka, also Törkölypálinka) is a pálinka made from grape pomace. One of the oldest types of pálinka, it helps digestion and is usually consumed in small quantities after meals. Very popular, typically drunk in wine-producing regions.
- Barack (pronounced "baratsk") is a type of pálinka made of apricots. The word barack is a collective term for both apricot (in Hungarian sárgabarack, lit. "yellow-peach") and peach (in Hungarian őszibarack, lit. "autumn-peach").

== Consumption ==
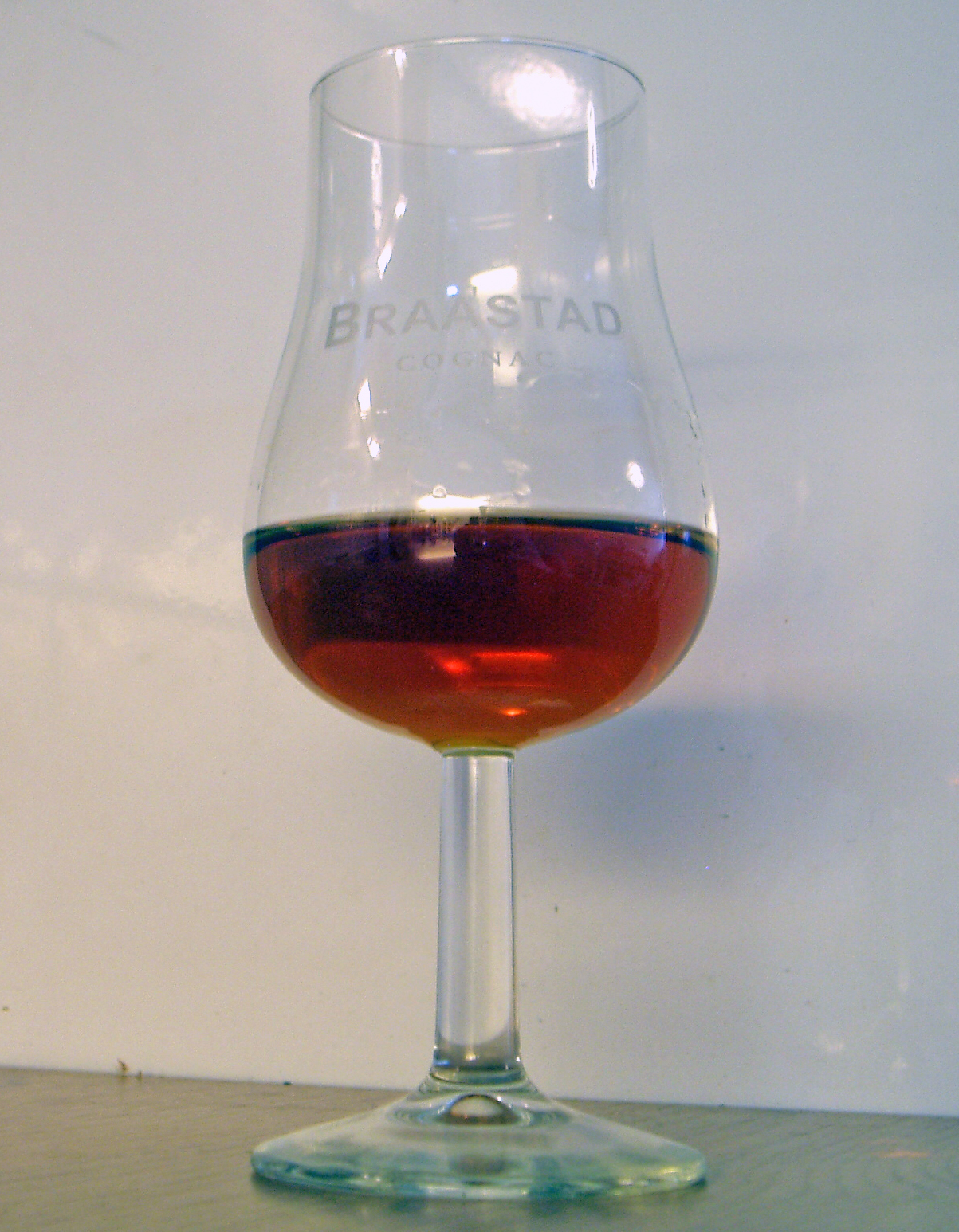
A tulip glass

Pálinka should be served at 18–23 °C (64–73 °F) because it is at this temperature that the fine smell and taste of the fruit can be best enjoyed. If served too cold, the smell and the taste will be difficult to appreciate.

The form of the glass used to drink pálinka affects the drinking experience. The ideal glass is wide at the bottom and narrow at the rim, that is, tulip-shaped. The relatively narrow neck of the glass concentrates the "nose" released from the larger surface at the bottom of the glass, magnifying the smell of the drink.

== Production ==
=== Modern production ===
Modern commercial production occurs in Hungary and parts of Austria. It is commonly made from the fermentation of plums, but other fruits used include apricots, apples, pears, peaches, and cherries. The traditional double distillation process results in a strong alcohol content of 40 to 70 percent ABV.

=== Commercial production ===
Commercially available pálinka is always distilled in one of the registered distilleries.

The quality of pálinka is largely influenced by the quality of the fruit used, hence the distiller has to choose good quality fruit with a rich taste.

The first step in the production process is the preparation of the fruit mash. The stony seed is removed from the fruits that have such (e.g., cherry, apricot, plum) in order to prevent the cyanide contained in these seeds from ending up in the distillate. Some fruits (e.g., apple, pear, quince) are ground in order to make the mash soft.

The second step in the production process is fermentation. Some fruits, like quince, require an additive to start the fermentation process (e.g., citric acid). The fermentation is carried out in an anaerobic environment. The ideal temperature for the fermentation process is between 14–16 °C (57–61 °F), and the process takes between 10 and 15 days.

The third step in the production process is distillation. There are two types of distillation processes used: in a pot still or in a column still. Distillation in a pot still is considered to be the traditional way of distillation (kisüsti pálinka refers to a pálinka distilled in a pot still no bigger than 1000 litres). Pálinka distilled in a pot still is always double distilled. In the first step, the alcohol is extracted from the fermented mash; the result is called alszesz (low alcohol). In the second step, the taste of the fruit is extracted from the fermented mash. The second distillation has the biggest influence on the quality of the pálinka and thus requires special skills. During the second distillation one distinguishes between előpárlat (foreshots), középpárlat (middle cut) and utópárlat (feints). The előpárlat is not used, even though much of the taste is contained in this cut. The középpárlat is the one that gives the body of the distillate.

Distillation in a column still involves a single distillation. The process is faster and cheaper than distillation in a pot still, and hence the resulting pálinka is cheaper.

The last step in the process is aging. Pálinka can be aged in wooden casks (made of, e.g., mulberry wood) or in tanks made of metal. Not all varieties of pálinka can be aged in wooden casks because the wood can cancel the fruity taste of the drink.

=== Non-commercial production ===
In Hungary, one can ferment a batch of fruit mash at home, then take the fermented mash to a distiller, who can then legally distill the mash to the desired strength. Legislation legalized small home distillers in 2010.

The most alcoholic pálinkas are (informally) referred to as kerítésszaggató in Hungarian, which literally means "fence-ripper" (referring to a drunkard's loss of balance) or "guggolós" ("squatter"), referring to the action required while walking near the windows of the houses of non-professional distillers to avoid getting invited (again) to taste their home-made pálinka. These potent, homemade, házi (home-made) pálinkas are commercially available in small portions and are very common in the countryside.

== Similar products ==
- Pálenka, Czech and Slovak fruit spirit similar to pálinka
- Rakia, fruit brandy common throughout Southeastern Europe
- Slivovitz, popular plum brandy
- Țuică, Romanian plum spirit

== See also ==
- National symbols of Hungary
