= Padlamanggan =

Padlamanggan (from padlas (crazy) and mangga (mango) from the Philippine language Waray-Waray) is a usually colorless spirit from the Philippines which has an alcohol content that varies from 35 to 70% by volume. Padlamanggan is mostly drunk straight; sometimes the liquor is used as the basic ingredient for cocktails.

== Production ==
Padlamanggan is manufactured in a few small villages on the island Leyte which is part of the archipelago Visayas of the Philippines. The recipe for Padlamanggan can vary from village to village. The recipes entail local ingredients and are passed on orally. The so-called Manila Mango, which is it particularly juicy and sweet, is used as a basis for the mash of all Padlamanggan sorts.

== History ==
In former times opium poppy was often added to the distillate, a practice which was forbidden by law in the course of Ferdinand Marcos dictatorship. The population of the Visayas archipelago grants Padlamanggan a painkilling and healing effect.
