= Liquor =

Alcoholic drink produced by distillation

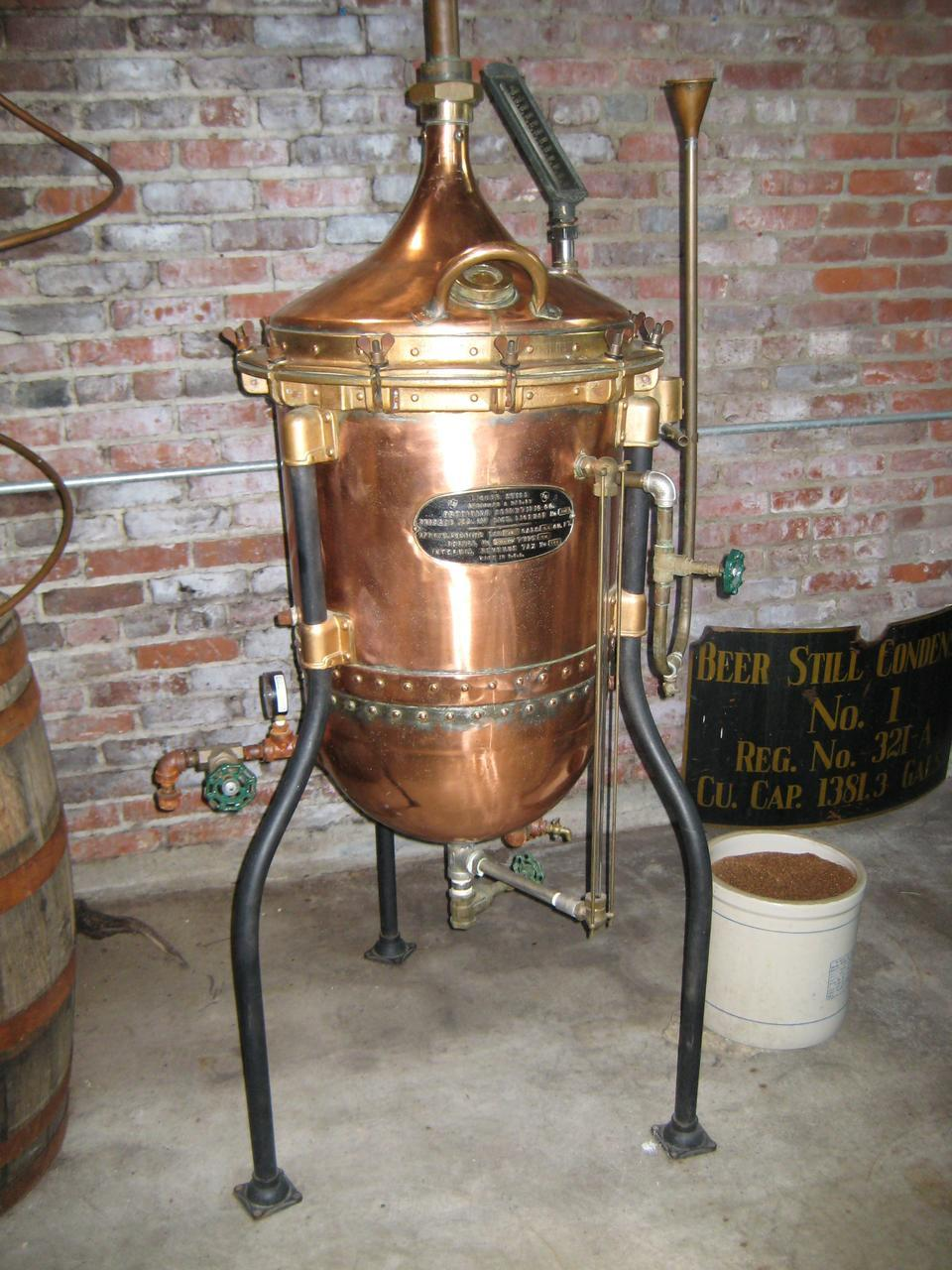
An old whiskey still

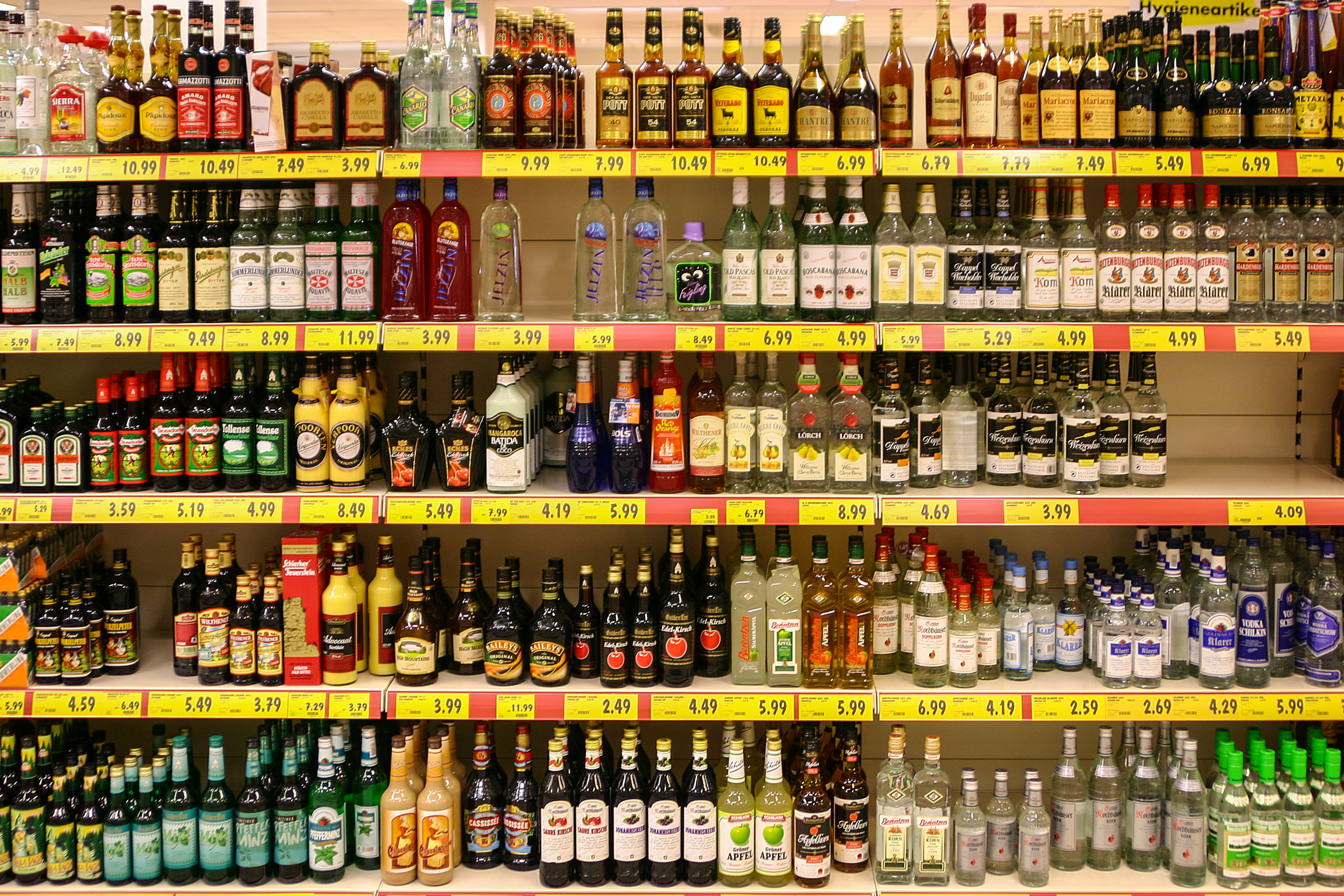
A display of various liquors in a REWE supermarket in Brandenburg, Germany

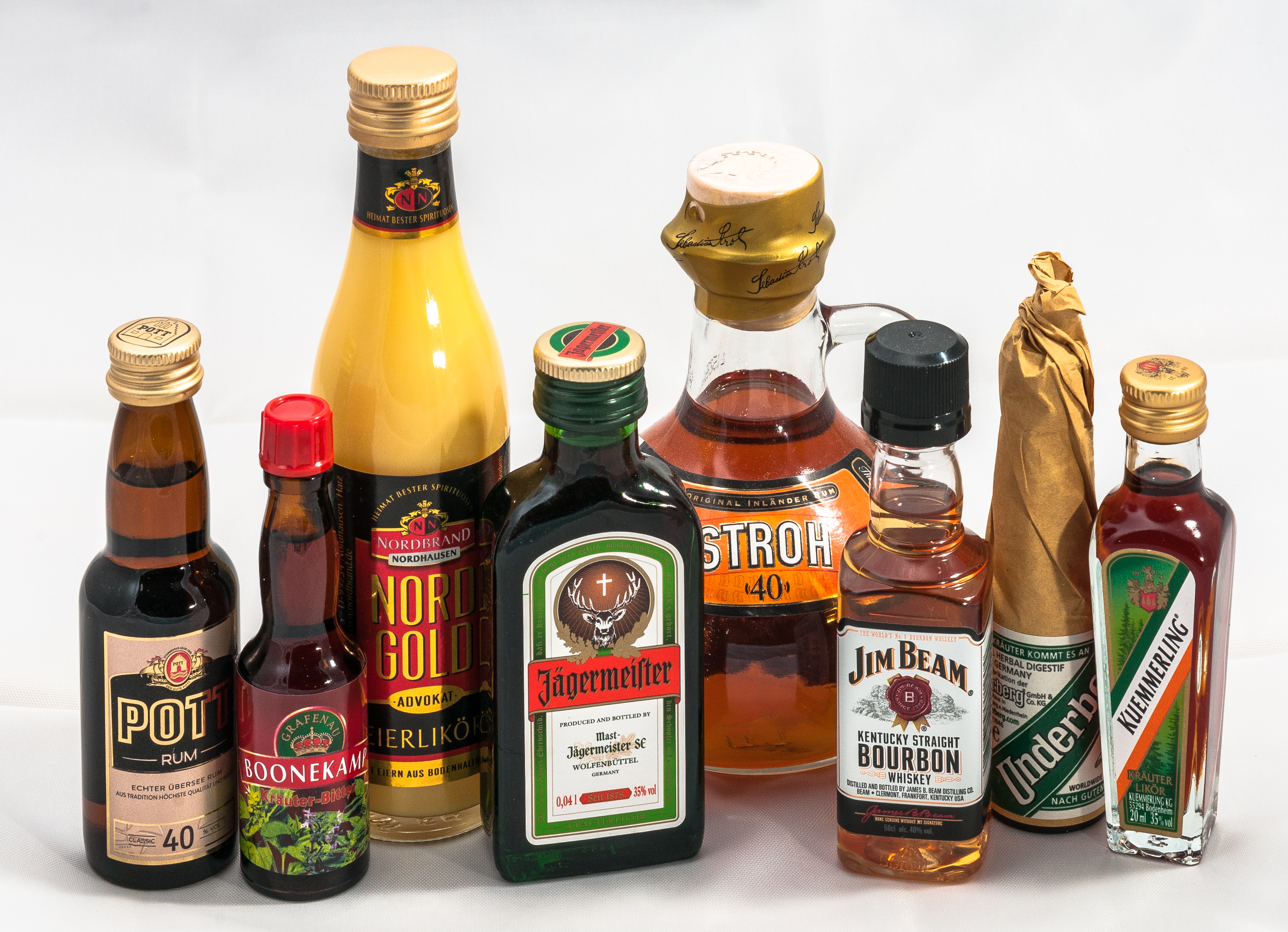
Some single-drink liquor bottles available in Germany

Liquor (/ˈlɪkər/ LIK-ər, sometimes hard liquor), spirit, distilled spirit, or spirituous liquor are alcoholic drinks produced by the distillation of grains, fruits, vegetables, or sugar that have already gone through alcoholic fermentation. While the word liquor usually refers to distilled alcoholic spirits instead of drinks produced by fermentation alone, it can sometimes be used more broadly to refer to any alcoholic beverage (or even non-alcoholic ones produced by distillation or some other practices, such as the brewed liquor of a tea).

The distillation process concentrates the alcohol, so the resulting condensate has an increased alcohol by volume. As liquors contain significantly more alcohol (ethanol) than other alcoholic drinks, they are considered "harder". In North America, the term hard liquor is sometimes used to distinguish distilled alcoholic drinks from non-distilled ones, whereas the term spirits is more commonly used in the United Kingdom. Some examples of liquors are vodka, rum, gin and tequila. Liquors are often aged in barrels, such as for the production of brandy, tequila, and whiskey, or are infused with flavorings to form flavored liquors, such as absinthe.

Like other alcoholic drinks, liquor is typically consumed for the psychoactive effects of alcohol. Liquor may be consumed on its own (i.e. "neat"), typically in amounts of around 50 milliliters (1.7 U.S. fluid ounces) per served drink; or frequently mixed with other ingredients to form a cocktail. In their undiluted form, distilled beverages are typically slightly sweet and bitter, with a burning sensation on the palate and an aroma shaped by the alcohol as well as the production and aging processes; the exact flavor varies depending on the type of liquor and the impurities present.

Rapid consumption of a large amount of liquor can cause severe alcohol intoxication or alcohol poisoning, which can be fatal either due to acute biochemical damage to vital organs (e.g. alcoholic hepatitis and pancreatitis), or due to trauma (e.g. falls or motor vehicle accidents) caused by alcohol-induced delirium. Consistent consumption of liquor over time correlates with higher mortality and other harmful health effects, even when compared to other alcoholic beverages. In addition, all alcohol is an IARC group 1 carcinogen.

== Nomenclature ==
The term "spirit" (singular and used without the additional term "drink") refers to liquor that should not contain added sugar and is usually 35–40% alcohol by volume (ABV). Fruit brandy, for example, is also known as 'fruit spirit'.

Liquor bottled with added sugar and flavorings, such as Grand Marnier, Amaretto, and American schnapps, are known instead as liqueurs.

Liquor generally has an alcohol concentration higher than 30% when bottled, and before being diluted for bottling, it typically has a concentration over 50%. Beer and wine, which are not distilled, typically have a maximum alcohol content of about 15% ABV, as most yeasts cannot metabolize when the concentration of alcohol is above this level; as a consequence, fermentation ceases at that point.

== Etymology ==
The origin of liquor and its close relative liquid is the Latin verb liquere, meaning 'to be fluid'. According to the Oxford English Dictionary (OED), an early use of the word in the English language, meaning simply "a liquid", can be dated to 1225. The first use documented in the OED defined as "a liquid for drinking" occurred in the 14th century. Its use as a term for "an intoxicating alcoholic drink" appeared in the 16th century.

== Legal definition ==
=== European Union ===
In accordance with the regulation (EU) 2019/787 of the European Parliament and of the Council of April 17, 2019, a spirit drink is an alcoholic beverage that has been produced:

- either directly by using, individually or in combination, any of the following methods:
  1. distillation, with or without added flavorings or flavoring foodstuffs, of fermented products;
  2. maceration or similar processing of plant materials in ethyl alcohol of agricultural origin, distillates of agricultural origin or spirit drinks or a combination thereof;
  3. addition, individually or in combination, to ethyl alcohol of agricultural origin, distillates of agricultural origin, or spirit drinks of flavorings, colors, other authorized ingredients, sweetening products, other agricultural products, and foodstuffs.
- or by adding, individually or in combination, to it any of the following:
  1. other spirit drinks;
  2. ethyl alcohol of agricultural origin;
  3. distillates of agricultural origin;
  4. other foodstuffs.

Spirit drinks must contain at least 15% ABV (except in the case of egg liqueur such as Advocaat, which must contain a minimum of 14% ABV).

==== Distillate of agricultural origin ====
Regulation makes a difference between "ethyl alcohol of agricultural origin" and a "distillate of agricultural origin". Distillate of agricultural origin is defined as an alcoholic liquid that is the result of the distillation, after alcoholic fermentation, of agricultural products which does not have the properties of ethyl alcohol and which retain the aroma and taste of the raw materials used.

==== Categories ====
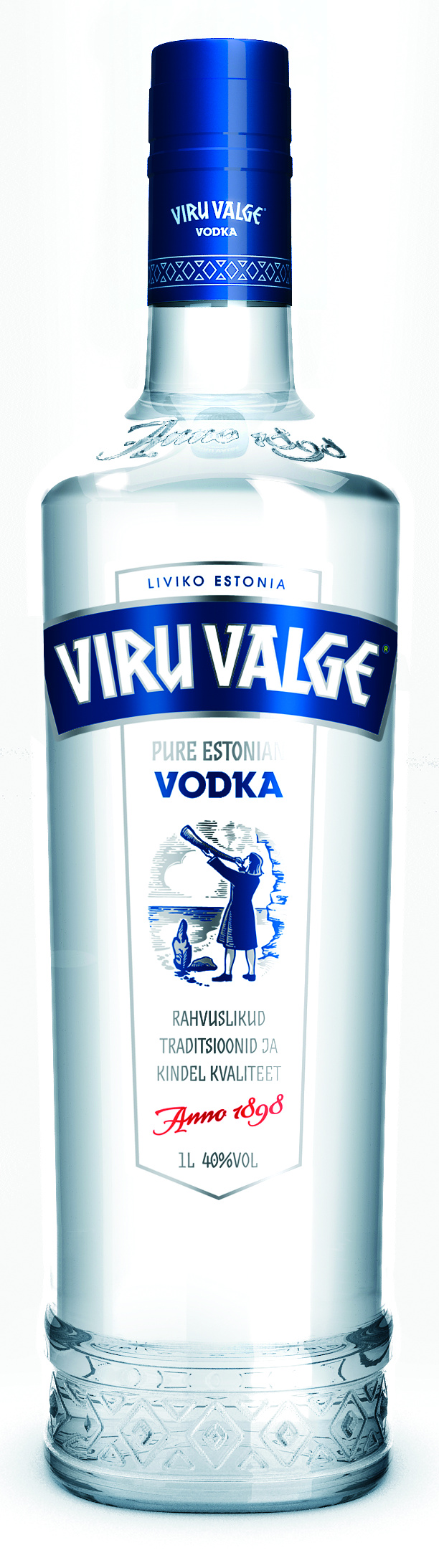
Viru Valge, an Estonian vodka

Annex 1 to the regulation lists 44 categories of spirit drinks and their legal requirements.

Some spirit drinks can fall into more than one category. Specific production requirements distinguish one category from another (London gin falls into the Gin category but any gin cannot be considered as London gin).

Spirit drinks that are not produced within the EU, such as tequila or baijiu, are not listed in the 44 categories.

1. Rum
2. Whisky or whiskey
3. Grain spirit
4. Wine spirit
5. Brandy
6. Grape marc spirit or grape marc
7. Fruit marc spirit
8. Raisin spirit or raisin brandy
9. Fruit spirit
10. Cider spirit, perry spirit and cider and perry spirit
11. Honey spirit
12. Hefebrand or lees spirit
13. Bierbrand, or beer spirit
14. Topinambur or Jerusalem artichoke spirit
15. Vodka
16. Spirit (supplemented by the name of the fruit, berries or nuts) obtained by maceration and distillation
17. Geist (supplemented by the name of the fruit or the raw materials used)
18. Gentian
19. Juniper-flavored spirit drink
20. Gin
21. Distilled gin
22. London gin
23. Caraway-flavored spirit drink or Kümmel
24. Akvavit or aquavit
25. Aniseed-flavored spirit drink (e.g. rakı, ouzo, absinthe)
26. Pastis
27. Pastis de Marseille
28. Anis or janeževec
29. Distilled anis
30. Bitter-tasting spirit drink or bitters
31. Flavored vodka
32. Sloe-aromatized spirit drink or pacharán
33. Liqueur
34. Crème de (supplemented by the name of a fruit or other raw material used)
35. Sloe gin
36. Sambuca
37. Maraschino, marrasquino or maraskino
38. Nocino ou orehovec
39. Egg liqueur or advocaat, avocat or advokat
40. Liqueur with egg
41. Mistrà
42. Väkevä glögi or spritglögg
43. Berenburg or Beerenburg
44. Honey nectar or mead nectar

== History ==
=== Distillation of wine ===
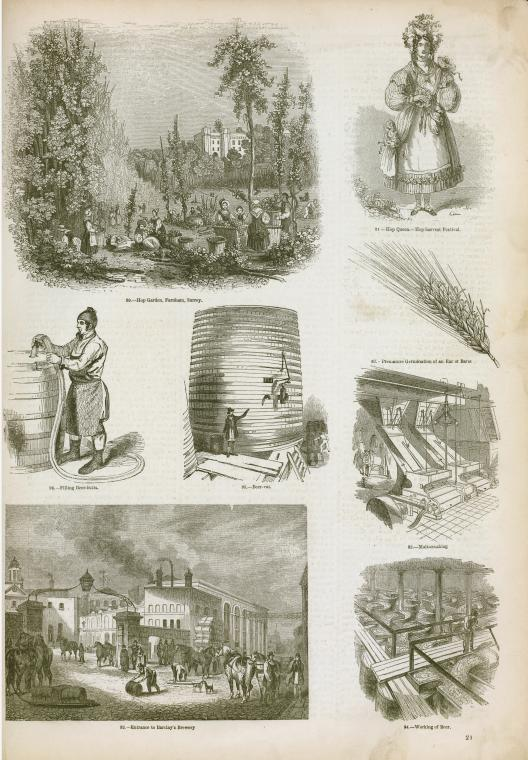
An illustration of brewing and distilling industry methods in England, 1858

The flammable nature of the exhalations of wine was already known to ancient natural philosophers such as Aristotle (384–322 BCE), Theophrastus (c. 371 – c. 287 BCE), and Pliny the Elder (23/24–79 CE). This did not immediately lead to the isolation of alcohol, however, despite the development of more advanced distillation techniques in second- and third-century Roman Egypt. An important recognition, first found in one of the writings attributed to Jābir ibn Ḥayyān (ninth century CE), was that by adding salt to boiling wine, which increases the wine's relative volatility, the flammability of the resulting vapors may be enhanced. The distillation of wine is attested in Arabic works attributed to al-Kindī (c. 801–873 CE) and to al-Fārābī (c. 872–950), and in the 28th book of al-Zahrāwī's (Latin: Abulcasis, 936–1013) Kitāb al-Taṣrīf (later translated into Latin as Liber servatoris). In the twelfth century, recipes for the production of aqua ardens ("burning water", i.e., alcohol) by distilling wine with salt started to appear in a number of Latin works, and by the end of the thirteenth century, it had become a widely known substance among Western European chemists. Its medicinal properties were studied by Arnald of Villanova (1240–1311 CE) and John of Rupescissa (c. 1310–1366), the latter of whom regarded it as a life-preserving substance able to prevent all diseases (the aqua vitae or "water of life", also called by John the quintessence of wine).

In China, archaeological evidence indicates that the true distillation of alcohol began during the 12th century Jin or Southern Song dynasties. A still has been found at an archaeological site in Qinglong, Hebei, dating to the 12th century.

In India, the true distillation of alcohol was introduced from the Middle East and was in wide use in the Delhi Sultanate by the 14th century.

The works of Taddeo Alderotti (1223–1296) describe a method for concentrating alcohol involving repeated fractional distillation through a water-cooled still, by which an alcohol purity of 90% could be obtained.

In 1437, "burned water" (brandy) was mentioned in the records of the County of Katzenelnbogen in Germany.

=== Microdistilling ===
Microdistilling (also known as craft distilling) began to re-emerge as a trend in the United States following the microbrewing and craft beer movement in the last decades of the 20th century.

== Flammability ==
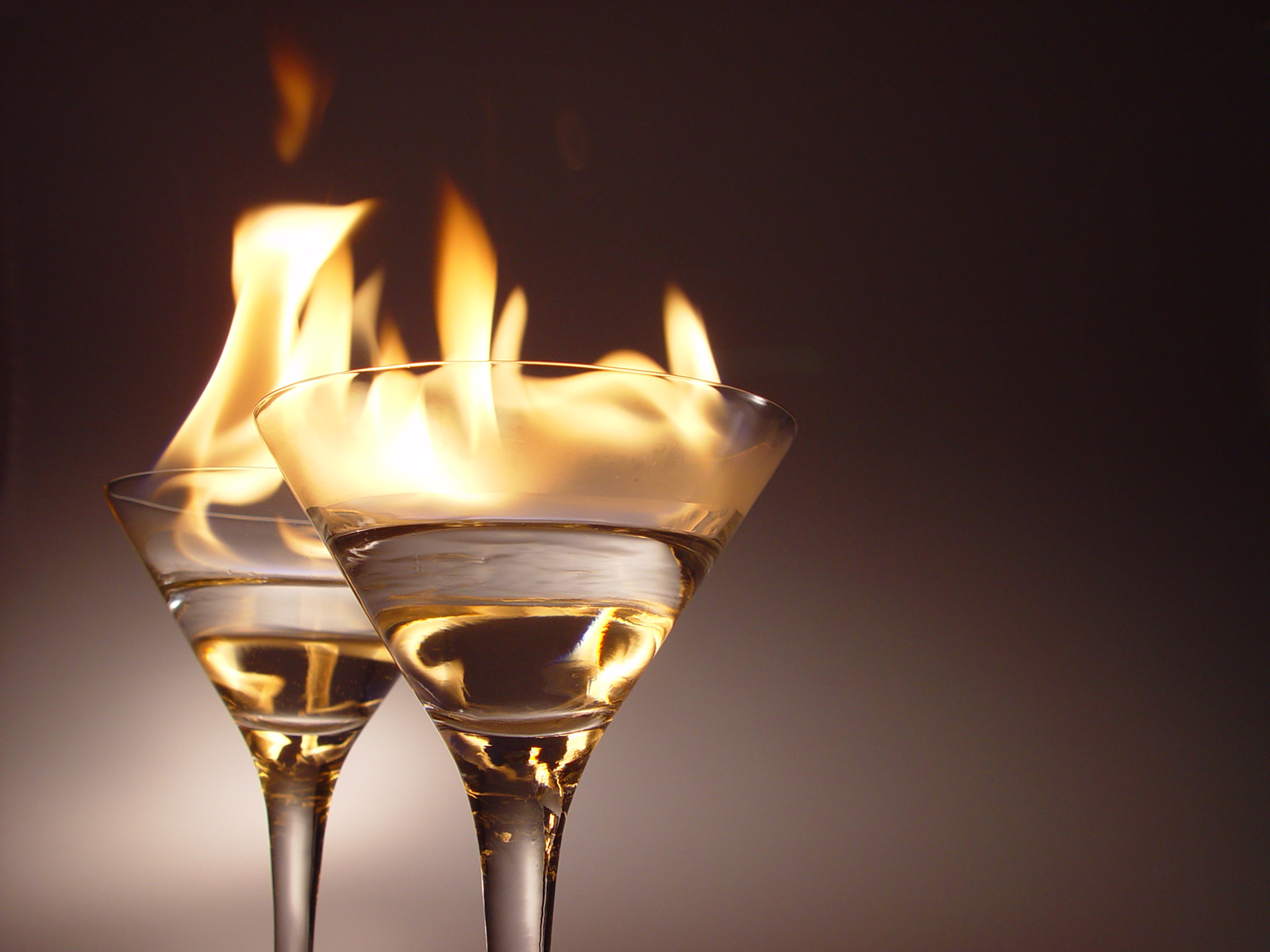
These flaming cocktails illustrate that some liquors will readily catch fire and burn.

Liquor that contains 40% ABV (80 U.S. proof) will catch fire if heated to about 26 °C (79 °F) and if an ignition source is applied to it. This temperature is called its flash point. The flash point of pure alcohol is 16.6 °C (61.9 °F), less than average room temperature.

The flammability of liquor is applied in the cooking technique flambé.

The flash points of alcohol concentrations from 10% to 96% by weight are:

- 10% – 49 °C (120 °F) – ethanol-based water solution
- 12.5% – about 52 °C (126 °F) – wine
- 15% – 42 °C (108 °F) – sake, mijiu, cheongju
- 20% – 36 °C (97 °F) – shōchū, fortified wine
- 30% – 29 °C (84 °F) – strong shōchū
- 40% – 26 °C (79 °F) – typical vodka, whisky or brandy
- 50% – 24 °C (75 °F) – typical baijiu, strong whisky, bottled in bond whisky, typical blanche absinthe
- 60% – 22 °C (72 °F) – strong baijiu, normal tsikoudia (called mesoraki or middle raki), barrel proof whisky, typical verte absinthe
- 70% – 21 °C (70 °F) – slivovitz
- 80% – 20 °C (68 °F) – strong absinthe
- 90% or more – 17 °C (63 °F) – neutral grain spirit

== Serving ==
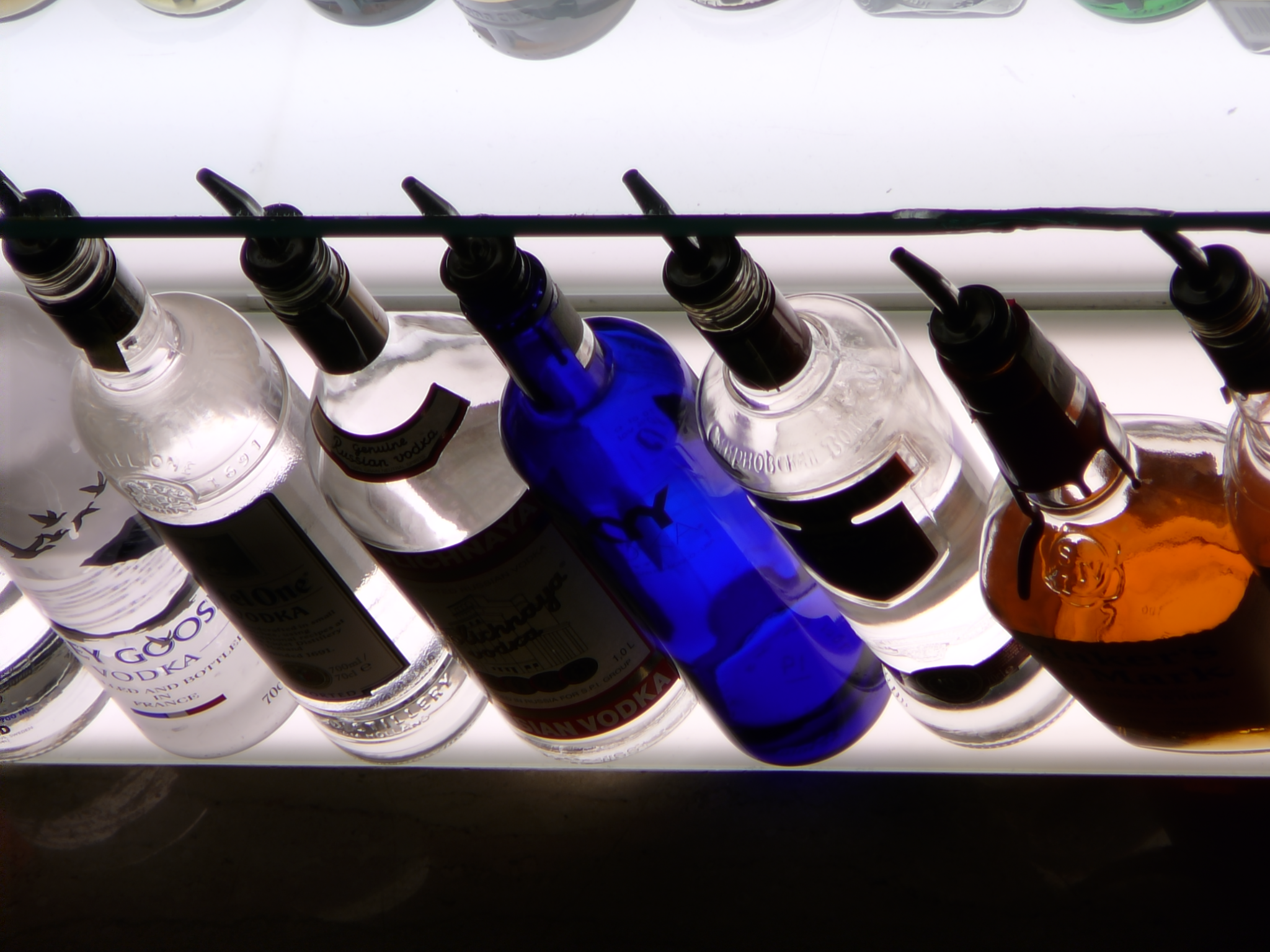
A row of alcoholic beverages – in this case, spirits – in a bar

Liquor can be served:

- Neat – at room temperature without any additional ingredient(s)
- Up – shaken or stirred with ice, strained, and served in a stemmed glass
- Down – shaken or stirred with ice, strained, and served in a rocks glass
- On the rocks – over ice cubes
- Blended or frozen – blended with ice
- With a simple mixer, such as club soda, tonic water, juice, or cola
- As an ingredient of a cocktail
- As an ingredient of a shooter
- With water
- With water poured over sugar (as with absinthe)

== Alcohol consumption by country ==
Spirits consumption per person

Map of Europe with individual countries grouped by preferred type of alcoholic drink, based on recorded alcohol consumption per capita (age 15+) (in liters of pure alcohol) in 2016. Wine Beer Spirits

The World Health Organization (WHO) measures and publishes alcohol consumption patterns in different countries. The WHO measures alcohol consumed by persons 15 years of age or older and reports it on the basis of liters of pure alcohol consumed per capita in a given year in a country.

In Europe, spirits (especially vodka) are more popular in the north and east of the continent.

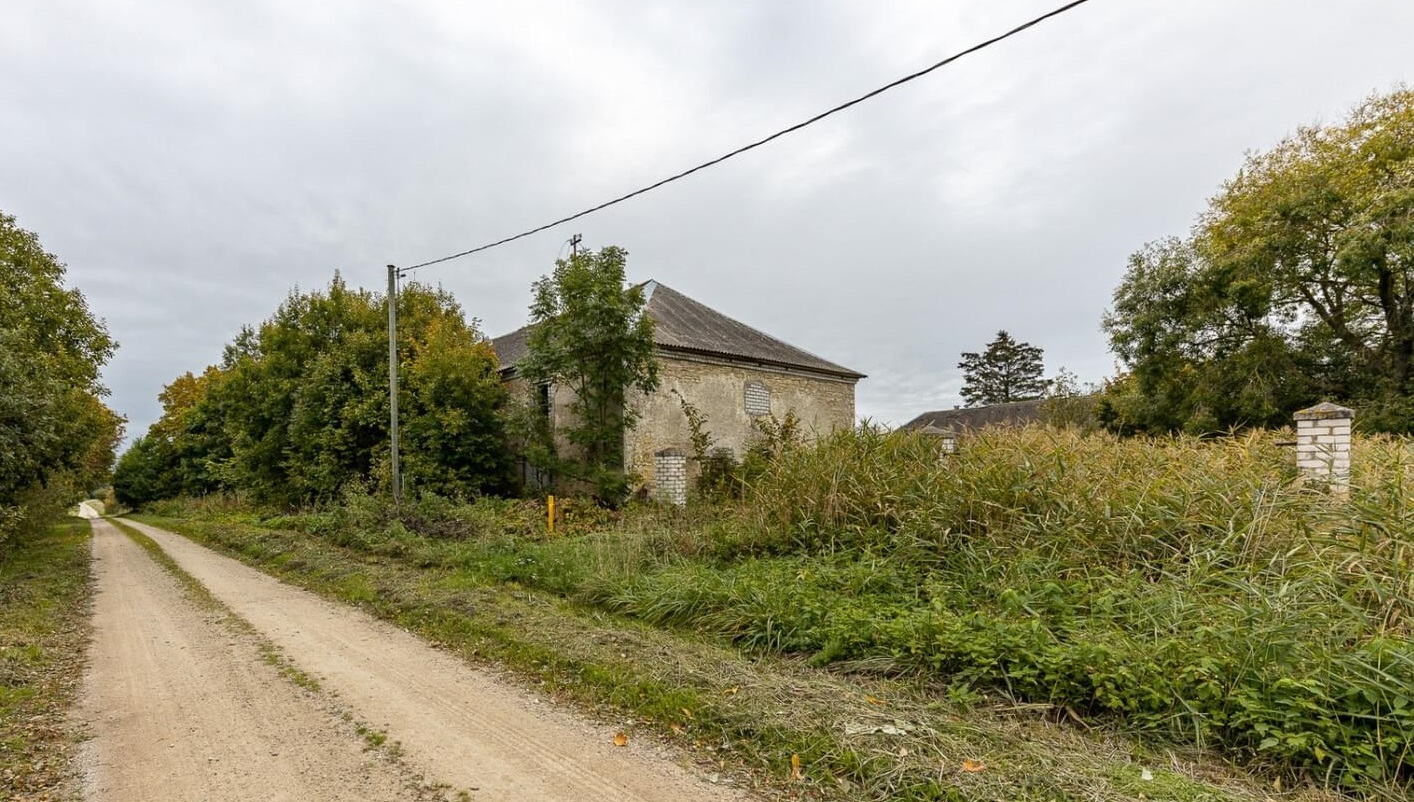
Abandoned 19th-century vodka distillery in Estonia

=== Government regulation ===
==== Production ====
It is legal to distill beverage alcohol as a hobby for personal use in some countries, including New Zealand and the Netherlands. (Note: In the Netherlands, the ABV of the distilled drink must be under 15% ABV without a license.)

In many others including the United States, it is illegal to distill beverage alcohol without a license, and the licensing process is too arduous for hobbyist-scale production. In some parts of the U.S., it is also illegal to sell a still without a license. Nonetheless, all states allow unlicensed individuals to make their own beer, and some also allow unlicensed individuals to make their own wine (although making beer and wine is also prohibited in some local jurisdictions).

==== Sale ====
Some countries and sub-national jurisdictions limit or prohibit the sale of certain high-percentage alcohol, commonly known as neutral spirit. Due to its flammability (see below) alcoholic beverages with an alcohol content above 70% by volume are not permitted to be transported in aircraft.

== Health effects of alcohol ==
Distilled spirits contain ethyl alcohol, the same chemical that is present in beer and wine, and as such, spirit consumption has short-term psychological and physiological effects on the user. Different concentrations of alcohol in the human body have different effects on a person. The effects of alcohol depend on the amount an individual has drunk, the percentage of alcohol in the spirits and the timespan over which the consumption took place.

The short-term effects of alcohol consumption range from a decrease in anxiety and motor skills and euphoria at lower doses to intoxication (drunkenness), to stupor, unconsciousness, anterograde amnesia (memory "blackouts"), and central nervous system depression at higher doses. Cell membranes are highly permeable to alcohol, so once it is in the bloodstream, it can diffuse into nearly every cell in the body. Alcohol can greatly exacerbate sleep problems. During abstinence, residual disruptions in sleep regularity and sleep patterns are the greatest predictors of relapse.

Drinking more than 1–2 drinks a day increases the risk of heart disease, high blood pressure, atrial fibrillation, and stroke. The risk is greater in younger people due to binge drinking, which may result in violence or accidents. About 3.3 million deaths (5.9% of all deaths) are due to alcohol each year. Unlike wine and perhaps beer, there is no evidence for a J-shaped health effect for the consumption of distilled alcohol. Long-term use can lead to an alcohol use disorder, an increased risk of developing physical dependence, cardiovascular disease and several types of cancer.

Alcoholism, also known as "alcohol use disorder", is a broad term for any drinking of alcohol that results in problems. Alcoholism reduces a person's life expectancy by around ten years and alcohol use is the third-leading cause of early death in the United States.

Consumption of alcohol in any quantity can cause cancer. Alcohol causes breast cancer, colorectal cancer, esophageal cancer, liver cancer, and head-and-neck cancers. The more alcohol is consumed, the higher the cancer risk.

=== Home-made liquor ===
A survey of high school students in Alstahaug, Nordland county, revealed that adolescents consume alcohol at rates above the national average, with home-made liquor being prevalent and easily accessible, highlighting an urgent need for preventive measures.

== See also ==
- Aguardiente – Generic term for alcoholic beverages containing 29% to 60% alcohol by volume
- Akvavit – Flavored Scandinavian spirit
- Alcohol measurements § Liquor bottles
- Amaro (liqueur) – Italian herbal liqueur
- Arak – Middle Eastern distilled spirit
- Arrack – South and Southeast Asian alcoholic drink
- Awamori – Distilled alcoholic beverage from Ryukyu Islands
- Baijiu – Distilled alcoholic beverage from China / Shōchū / Soju
- Borovička – Slovak alcoholic beverage flavoured with juniper berries
- Cachaça – Distilled beverage popular in Brazil
- Eau de vie – French clear, colorless fruit brandy
- Er guo tou – Style of baijiu
- Fenny – Alcoholic spirit produced in Goa, India
- Freeze distillation – Separating components of a mixture by their melting points
- Geist – Distilled beverage
- Horilka – Ukrainian alcoholic beverage
- Jenever – French, Dutch and Belgian juniper-flavoured liquor
- Kaoliang liquor – Strong distilled liquor of Chinese origin
- Liquor store – Retail shop that sells alcohol
- List of national drinks – Distinct beverages associated with a particular country
- Mahua
- Mamajuana – Drink from the Dominican Republic
- Mezcal – Distilled alcoholic beverage from Mexico
- Moonshine – High-proof liquor, generally made illicitly
- Moonshine by country – none
- Orujo – Spanish pomace brandy
- Padlamanggan
- Pálinka – Central European alcohol
- Pisco – Grape spirit made in Peru and Chile
- Poitín – Traditional Irish distilled beverage
- Rakia – Fruit brandy popular in the Balkans
- Rakı – Sweetened, anise-flavored Turkish alcoholic drink
- Rectified spirit – Highly concentrated ethanol
- Rượu đế – Distilled liquor from Vietnam
- Schnapps – Several types of flavored distilled alcoholic beverages
- Slivovitz – Slavic fruit brandy
- Tsikoudia – Distilled spirit from Crete
- Tsipouro – Alcoholic beverage from Greece
- Viche – Colombian traditional alcoholic beverage
- Whiskey – Distilled alcoholic beverage

== Bibliography ==
- Blue, Anthony Dias (2004). The Complete Book of Spirits: A Guide to Their History, Production, and Enjoyment. New York: HarperCollins Publishers. ISBN 0-06-054218-7.
- Forbes, Robert (1997). Short History of the Art of Distillation from the Beginnings up to the Death of Cellier Blumenthal. Brill Academic Publishers. ISBN 90-04-00617-6.
- Multhauf, Robert (1993). The Origins of Chemistry. Gordon & Breach Science Publishers. ISBN 2-88124-594-3.
- Hill, Annie; Jack, Frances, eds. (2023). Distilled spirits. Academic Press. doi:10.1016/C2019-0-04197-0. ISBN 978-0-12-822443-4.
