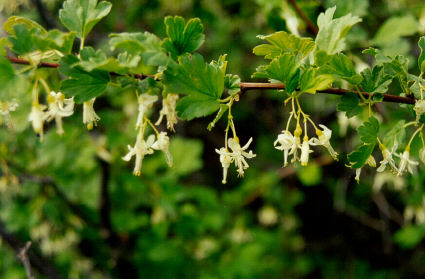

Conservation status
- Vulnerable (NatureServe)

Scientific classification
- Kingdom: Plantae
- Clade: Tracheophytes
- Clade: Angiosperms
- Clade: Eudicots
- Order: Saxifragales
- Family: Grossulariaceae
- Genus: Ribes
- Species: R. niveum

Binomial name
- Ribes niveum Lindl., 1834

Synonyms
- Grossularia nivea (Lindl.) Spach (1838); Ribes gracile Michx. (1803); Ribes niveum f. pilosum H.St.John (1937)

= Ribes niveum =

North American species of currant

Ribes niveum is a North American species of currant known by the common names snowy gooseberry, white-flowered gooseberry, or snow currant.

== Description ==
Ribes niveum is a shrub up to 3 meters (10 feet) tall. The branches have 1–3 spines at the nodes. The leaves are 2.5–5 centimetres (1–2 in) wide, with 3–5 toothed lobes.

The flowers are white or pale pink. The berries are dark blue or dark purple, and are palatable but sour.

== Distribution and habitat ==
It is native to the western United States (Washington, Idaho, Oregon, and Nevada with isolated populations in Colorado and New Mexico). It grows in open hillsides and thickets along streams.
