= Viche (drink) =

Colombian traditional alcoholic beverage

Viche is a traditional home-brewed alcoholic drink made from sugar cane popular on Colombia’s Pacific Coast. It used to be illegal but in September 2021 Colombia's senate passed a law declaring the beverage a part of the country’s "cultural and ancestral heritage," allowing also commercial production.

Viche has long been used in traditional communities as a ceremonial intoxicant and for medicinal purposes, notably to purge stomach bugs and parasites, and as an aphrodisiac.

Viche contains approximately 35% of alcohol. It can be consumed on its own but it is often mixed with sugary fruit juices.
