= Maceration (cooking) =

Softening of food using a liquid

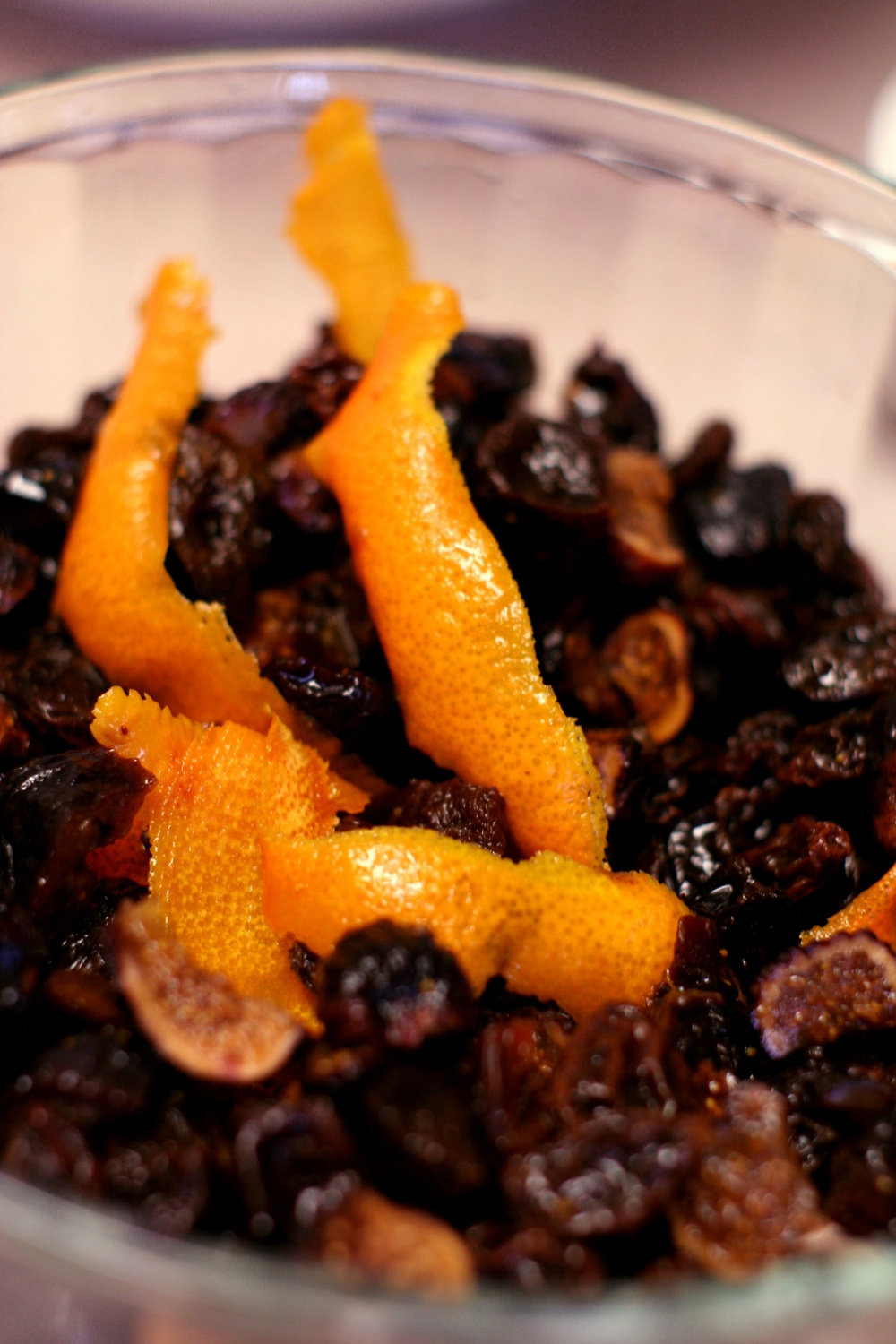
Maceration of dried fruit in rum and apple juice

Maceration is the process of preparing foods by softening, breaking down into pieces, or extracting its flavors, typically using a liquid.

Maceration is an important step in the making of wine, and is also used in the production of other flavored alcoholic beverages, such as cordials, liqueurs, and Geister.

Maceration may also refer to the preparing of fresh fruits (such as strawberries or raspberries) by sprinkling them with sugar (and sometimes a small amount of salt) in order to promote the release of the fruit's juices, making the food more flavorful and easier to chew.

Maceration is often confused with marination, which is the process of soaking food in a seasoned, often acidic, liquid before cooking.

== Examples ==
Some herbal preparations call for maceration, as it is one way to extract delicate or highly volatile herbal essences without applying heat.

Maceration of byproducts from food processing plants and other organic byproducts such as cooking oil, stubble, wood chips or manure can involve the use of a chopper pump to create a slurry which can be used to create compost or co-digestion feedstock in biogas plants (or both).

== Etymology ==
The word maceration comes from Latin macerare, which means "to soften" or "to steep". It entered English in the mid-1500s referring to the wasting of flesh.

== Ritual foods ==
In Mandaeism, hamra is made by macerating raisins mixed in water blessed by priests.

== See also ==
- Food processor
