= List of alcoholic drinks =

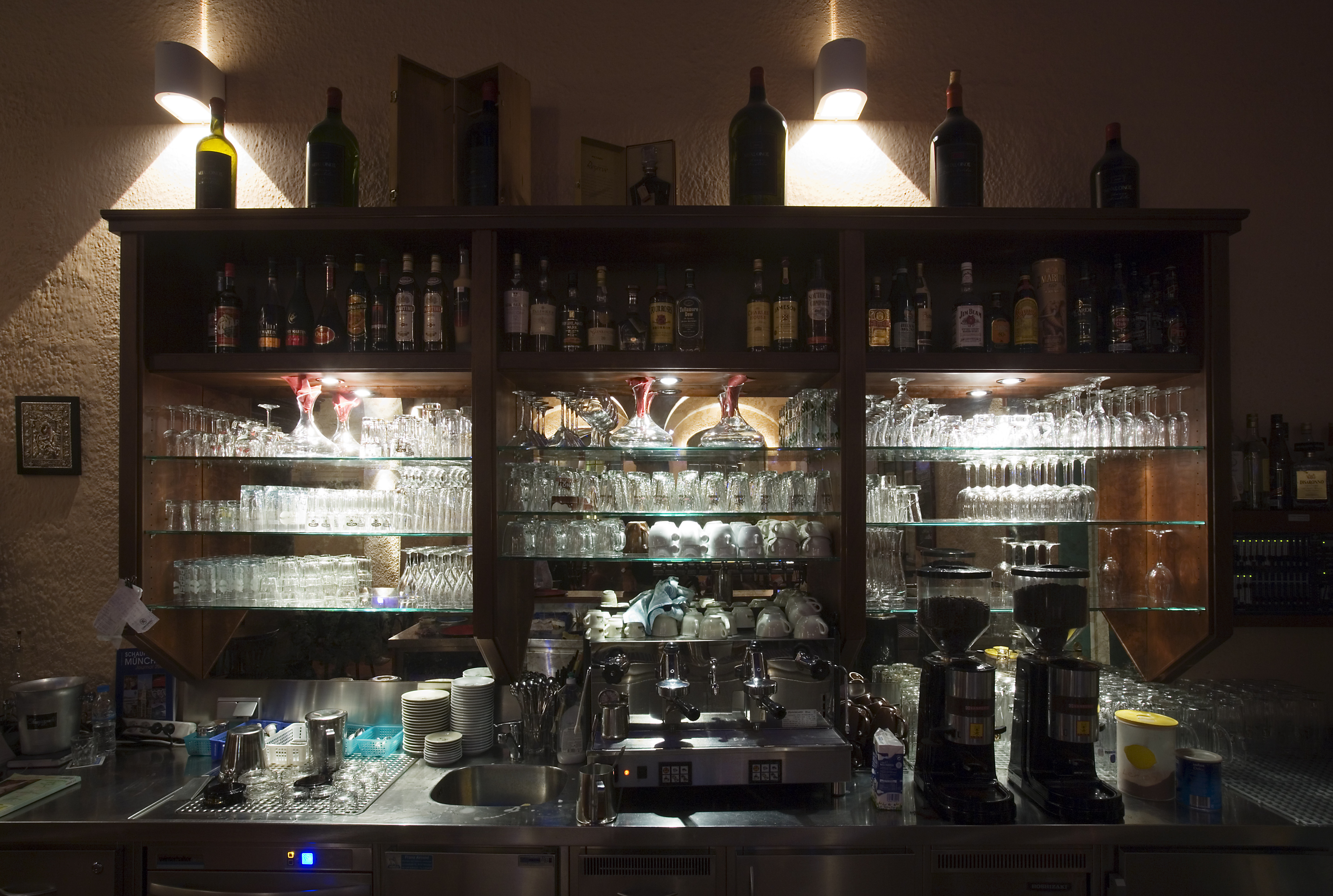
A fully supplied bar with various types of drinks

This is a list of alcoholic drinks. An alcoholic drink is a drink that contains ethanol, commonly known as alcohol. Alcoholic drinks are divided into three general classes: beers, wines, and distilled beverages. They are legally consumed in most countries, and over one hundred countries have laws regulating their production, sale, and consumption. In particular, such laws specify the minimum age at which a person may legally buy or drink them. This minimum age varies between 15 and 21 years, depending upon the country and the type of drink. Most nations set it at 18 years of age.

== Drinks by raw material ==
The names of some alcoholic drinks are determined by their raw material.

Grains	Name of fermented beverage	Name of distilled beverage
Barley	beer, barley wine	Scotch whisky, Irish whiskey, gin, jenever (Central Europe), ginebra (Spain, Argentina, Philippines), shōchū (mugijōchū) (Japan), soju (Korea), baijiu (China)
Buckwheat	beer	buckwheat whisky (Brittany), shōchū (sobajōchū) (Japan)
Corn	chicha, corn beer, tesguino	bourbon whiskey, moonshine, also vodka (rare)
Millet	millet beer (Sub-Saharan Africa), tongba (Nepal), boza (the Balkans, Turkey), chhaang (India, Nepal), millet wine (Taiwan), burukutu (Tropical Africa)	kachasu (Sub-Saharan Africa), raksi (Nepal, India, Tibet)
Oat	beer, oatmeal stout	oat whiskey
Rice	beer, brem (Indonesia), ruou gao (Vietnam), tuak (Borneo Island, Brunei/Indonesia/Malaysia), sato (Thailand), huangjiu and choujiu (China), sake (Japan), makgeolli and cheongju (Korea), sonti, handia, and chuak (India), thwon (Newari), Jaad (Nepal)	aila (Newari), Raksi (Nepal), rice baijiu (China), shōchū (komejōchū) and awamori (Japan), soju (Korea), langkau and montoku (Malaysia), hkaung rai (Myanmar), arrack (Indonesia), lao khao (Thailand)
Rye	rye beer, kvass	rye whiskey, vodka (Russia), korn (Germany)
Sorghum	burukutu (Nigeria), pito (Ghana), merisa (southern Sudan), bilibili (Chad, Central African Republic, Cameroon)	Maotai, Kaoliang liquor, certain other types of baijiu (China)
Wheat	wheat beer	horilka (Ukraine), vodka, wheat whiskey, weizenkorn (Germany), soju (Korea)
Fruit juice	Name of fermented beverage	Name of distilled beverage
Apples	cider (U.S.: "hard cider"), apfelwein	jabukovača (Serbia), applejack (or apple brandy), calvados, cider
Apricots	jerkum	kajsijevača (Serbia), kaisieva rakia (Bulgaria), pálinka (Hungary)
Bananas or plantains	cauim (Kuna Indians of Panama), urgwagwa (Uganda, Rwanda), mbege (with millet malt; Tanzania), kasikisi (with sorghum malt; Democratic Republic of the Congo)	majmunovača (Balkans)
Blueberries		borovnica (Croatia)
Cashews		feni (India)
Cherries	cherry wine (Denmark)	Kirsch (Germany, Switzerland)
Coconuts or palm	palm wine, bahar (Malaysia), tuak (Brunei, Indonesia, Malaysia)	arrack, lambanog (Sri Lanka, India, Philippines)
Elderberries	elderberry wine	
Gouqi	gouqi jiu (China)	gouqi jiu (China)
Ginger with sugar, ginger with raisins	ginger ale, ginger beer, ginger wine	
Grapes	wine, Cachina (Perú)	brandy, cognac (France), vermouth, armagnac (France), branntwein (Germany), pisco (Peru), rakija (The Balkans, Turkey), singani (Bolivia), arak (Syria, Lebanon, Jordan), törkölypálinka (Hungary), zivania (Cyprus)
Juniper berries	smreka (Balkans)	gin, jenever (Netherlands/Belgium), borovička (Slovakia), rakija (Balkans), brinjevec (Slovenia)
Mulberries	mulberry wine	oghi (Armenia)
Myrica rubra	yangmei jiu (China)	yangmei jiu (China)
Nopal fruit	colonche (Mexico)	
Pears	perry, or pear cider; poiré (France)	kruškovac (Croatia), viljamovka (Serbia), Poire Williams, pear brandy, eau-de-vie (France), pálinka (Hungary), krushova rakia / krushevitsa (Bulgaria)
Pineapples	tepache (Mexico), Pineapple Wine (Hawaii)	
Plums	plum wine, plum jerkum	šljivovica (Balkans and Central Europe), slivovitz, țuică (România), umeshu (Japan), pálinka, slivova rakia / slivovitsa (Bulgaria)
Pomace	pomace wine	raki/ouzo/pastis/sambuca (Turkey/Greece/France/Italy), tsipouro/tsikoudia (Greece), grappa (Italy/Argentina/Uruguay), trester (Germany), marc (France), orujo (Spain), zivania (Cyprus), bagaço (Portugal), tescovină (Romania), arak (Iran)
Pomegranates	pomegranate wine (Armenia)	
Quinces		dunjevača (Serbia)
Raspberries	raspberry wine (US, Canada)	Himbeergeist (Germany, Switzerland)
Sausage tree fruit	muratina wine (Kenya)	
Flowers	Name of fermented beverage	Name of distilled beverage
Madhuca longifolia	mahudo and mahuda no daru (Gujarat), mahuva ki sharaab, madhvi, and tharra (Madhya Pradesh, Chhattisgarh)	
Vegetables	Name of fermented beverage	Name of distilled beverage
Agave juice		tequila, mezcal, raicilla, bacanora
Agave sap	pulque	
Cassava	Saliva-fermented beverages: cauim; chicha: Throughout the Amazon Basin, including the interiors of Brazil, Ecuador, Peru, and Venezuela, chicha is made most often with cassava; in Peruvian Amazonia chichia is known as masato.; kasiri (Sub-Saharan Africa); nihamanchi (South America), also known as nijimanche (Ecuador and Peru); parakari (Guyana); sakurá (Brazil, Surinam)	tiquira (Brazil)
Ginger root juice	ginger beer (Botswana)	
Potato	potato beer	horilka (Ukraine), vodka (Poland), Kartoffelschnaps (Germany), akvavit (Scandinavia), poitín (poteen) (Ireland), tuzemák (Czech Republic), brennivín (Iceland)
Sugarcane juice, or molasses	basi, betsa-betsa (regional)	rum (Caribbean), rhum agricole (Haiti, Martinique, Guadeloupe and the rest of the French Caribbean), clairin (Haiti), cachaça (Brazil), desi daru (India), aguardiente de caña (Spain), aguardiente, guaro, lavagallo, pinga (Venezuela, Colombia, Nicaragua), mamajuana (Dominican Republic), gongo and konyagi (Tanzania), cocoroco (Bolivia), caña (Argentina, Uruguay), espinillar (Uruguay), caña blanca (Paraguay), ginebra (Philippines)
Sweet potato		shōchū (imojōchū) (Japan), soju (Korea)
Ti root		okolehao (Hawai'i)
Other raw materials	Name of fermented beverage	Name of distilled beverage
Sap of palm	coyol wine (Central America), tembo (Sub-Saharan Africa), toddy (Indian subcontinent), namtanmao (Thailand)	
Sap of Arenga pinnata, coconut, Borassus flabellifer	palm wine, tubâ (Philippines), namtanmao (Thailand), tuak (Brunei, Indonesia, and Malaysia)	arrack, lambanog (Philippines)
Honey	mead, horilka (Ukraine), sima (Finland), tej (Ethiopia)	medica (Croatia), distilled mead, honey-flavored liqueur
Milk	kumis, kefir, blaand	arkhi (Mongolia)
Sugar	kilju (Finland)	shōchū (kokutō shōchū): made from brown sugar (Japan) or rum
Walnuts		orahovac (Croatia, Serbia)

== Alcoholic fermented drinks ==
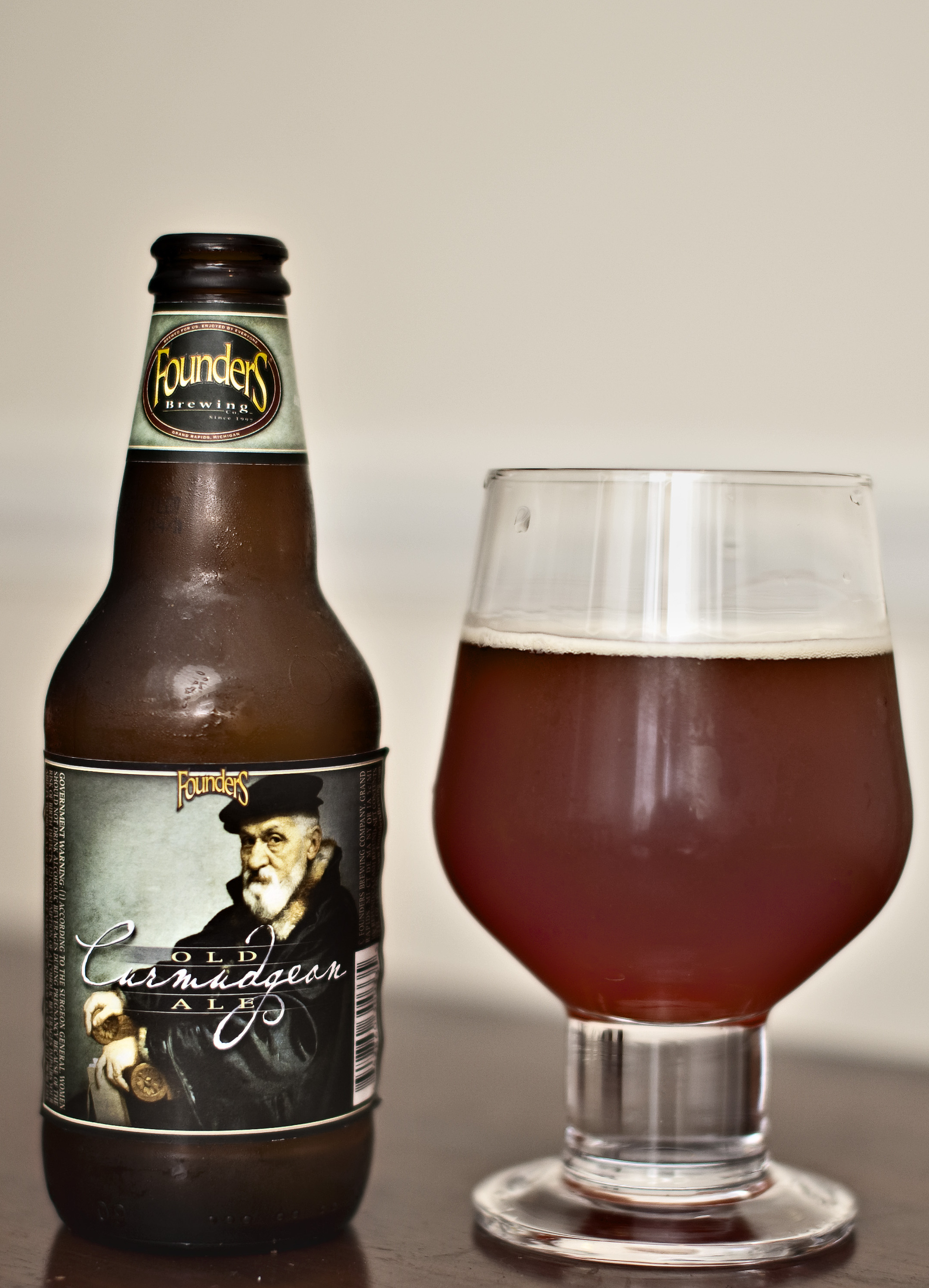
Founders Old Curmudgeon old ale

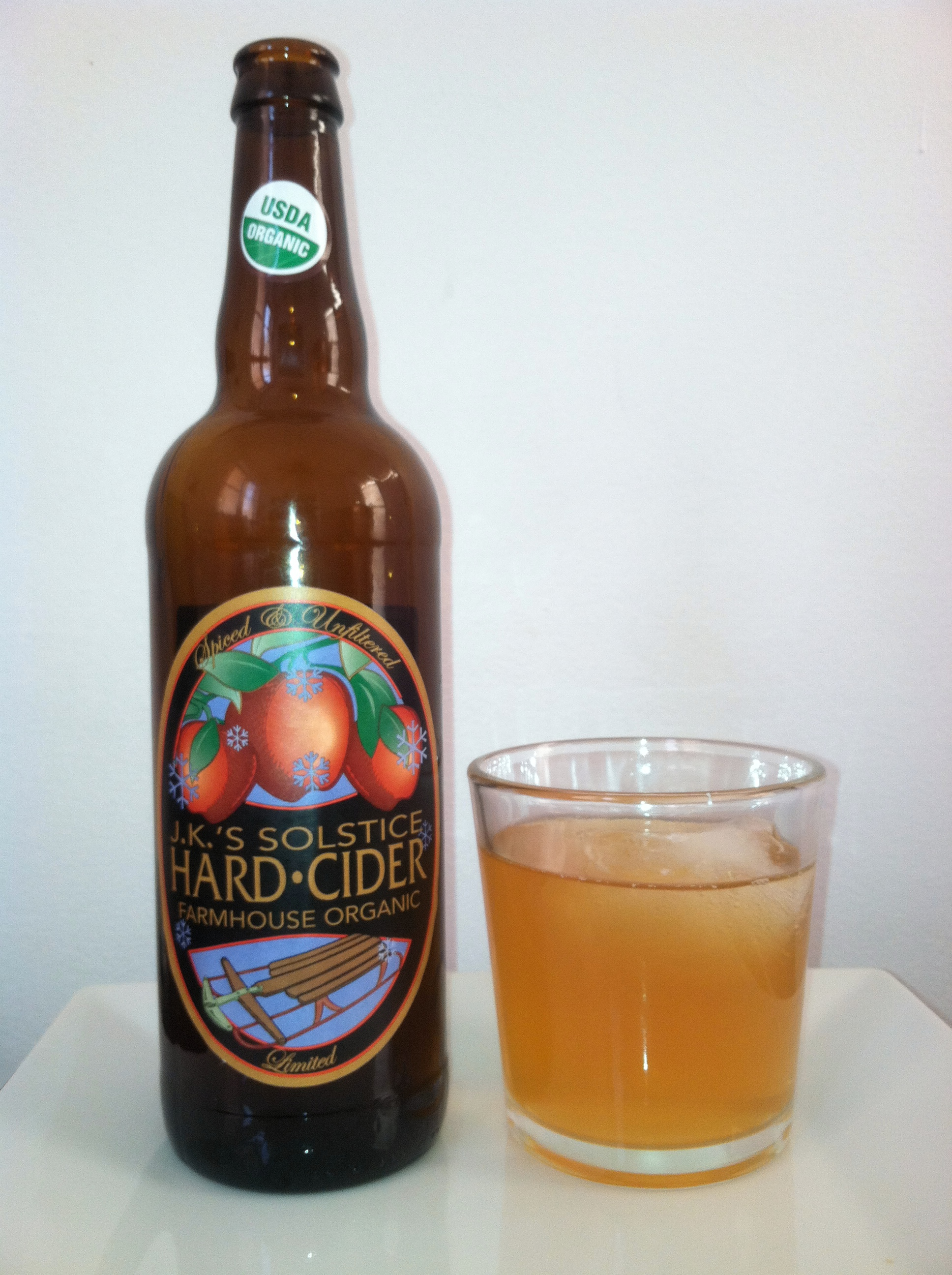
A hard cider produced in Michigan, U.S.

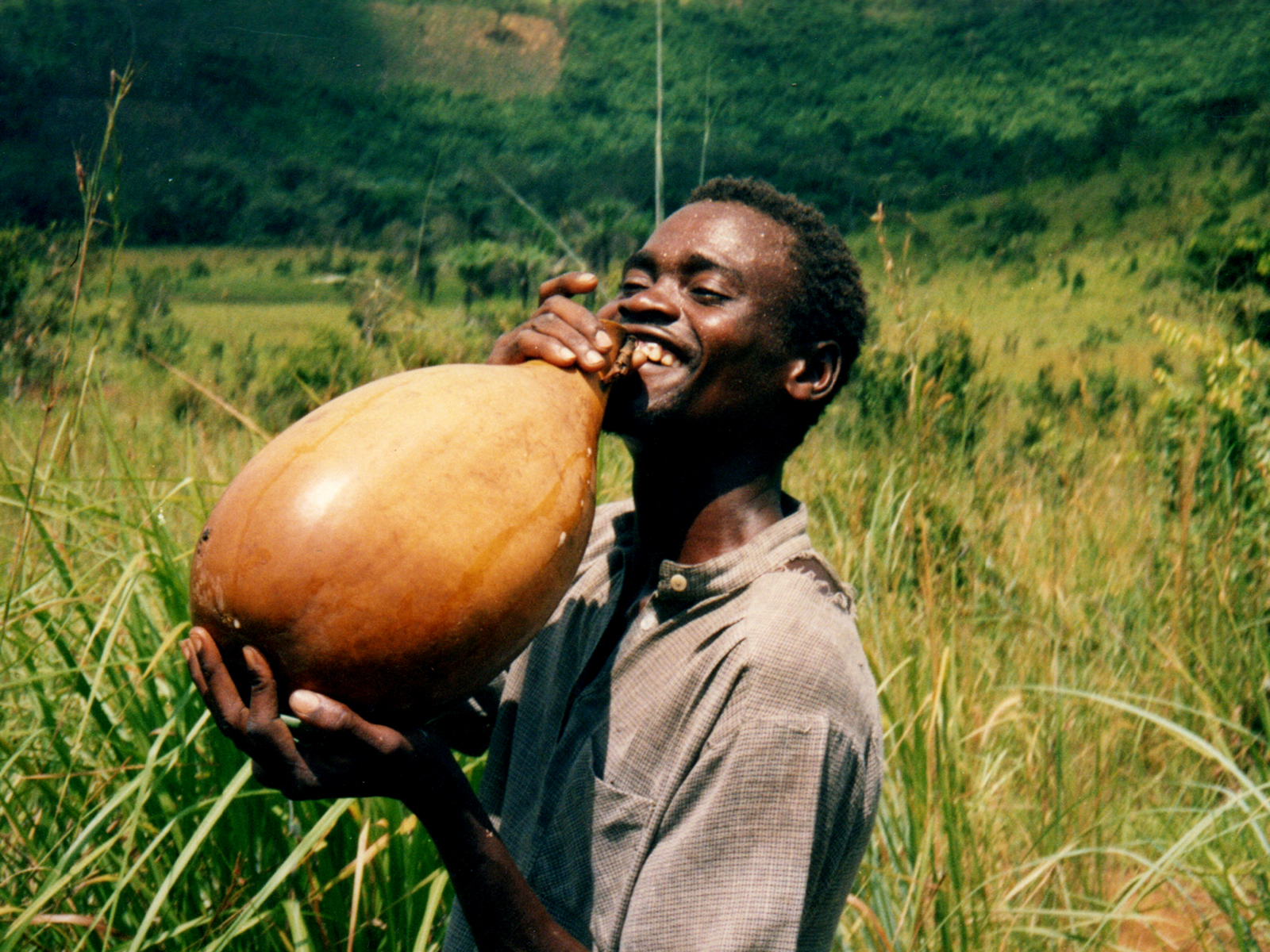
Palm wine is collected, fermented and stored in calabashes in Bandundu Province, Democratic Republic of the Congo.

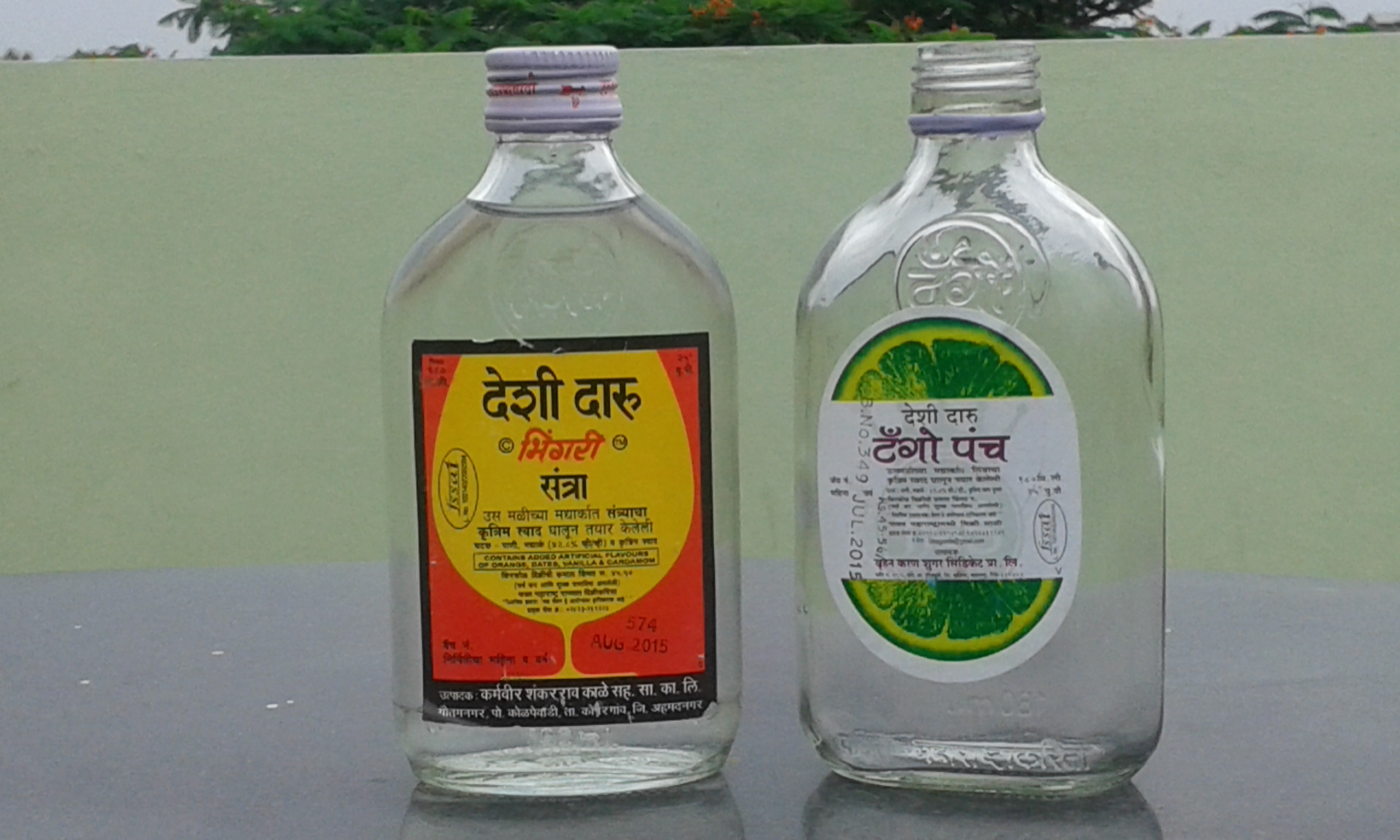
Desi daru from India

- Beer
  - Ale
    - Barleywine
    - Bitter ale
    - Brown ale
    - Cask ale
    - Mild ale
    - Old ale
    - Pale ale
      - Scotch ale
    - Porter (dark beer made from brown malt)
      - Stout (strong Porter)
    - Stock ale
  - Fruit beer
  - Lager
    - Pale lager (also "dry beer", made with a slow acting yeast that ferments at a low temperature while being stored)
      - Bock (strong lager)
      - Maerzen/Oktoberfest Beer
      - Pilsener (lighter lager brewed with partially malted barley)
    - Schwarzbier (dark lager)
  - Sahti (Finnish)
  - Small beer (very low alcohol)
  - Sur (made from rye)
  - Wheat beer (or "Hefeweizen", made with wheat in addition to malted barley)
    - Witbier ("White Beer", made with herbs or fruit instead of or in addition to hops)
- Cauim (made from cassava or maize)
- Cheongju (Korean, made from rice)
- Chicha (made from cassava, maize root, grape, apple or other fruits)
- Cider (made from apple juice or other fruit juice)
  - Perry (made from pears)
  - Plum jerkum (made from plums)
- Huangjiu (made from rice, millet, or wheat using a special starter culture of yeast, mold, and bacteria)
- Icariine liquor
- Kasiri (made from cassava)
- Kilju (made from sugar or honey)
- Kumis (Central Asia, traditionally made from horse milk but now primarily cow milk)
- Makgeolli (Korean, made from rice)
- Mead (made from honey)
- Nihamanchi (South America), also known as nijimanche (Ecuador and Peru) (made from cassava)
- Palm wine (made from the sap of various palm trees)
- Parakari (made from cassava)
- Pulque (originally made by the natives of Mexico, made from the sap of the maguey plant)
- Sake (made from polished rice)
- Sakurá (made from cassava)
- Sato
- Sonti
- Tapuy (Philippines, made from glutinous rice)
- Tepache
- Tiswin (made from corn or saguaro, a large cactus)
- Tonto
- Wine
  - Coca wine
  - Fortified wine
    - Port
    - Madeira
    - Marsala
    - Sherry
    - Vermouth
    - Vinsanto
  - Fruit wine
  - Table wine
  - Sangria
  - Sparkling wine
    - Champagne

== Distilled beverages ==
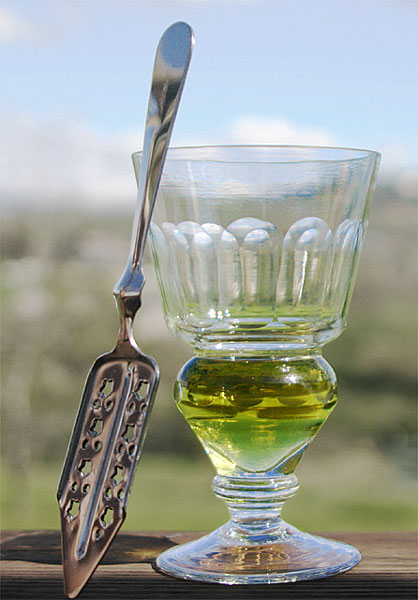
A reservoir glass filled with a naturally colored verte absinthe, next to an absinthe spoon

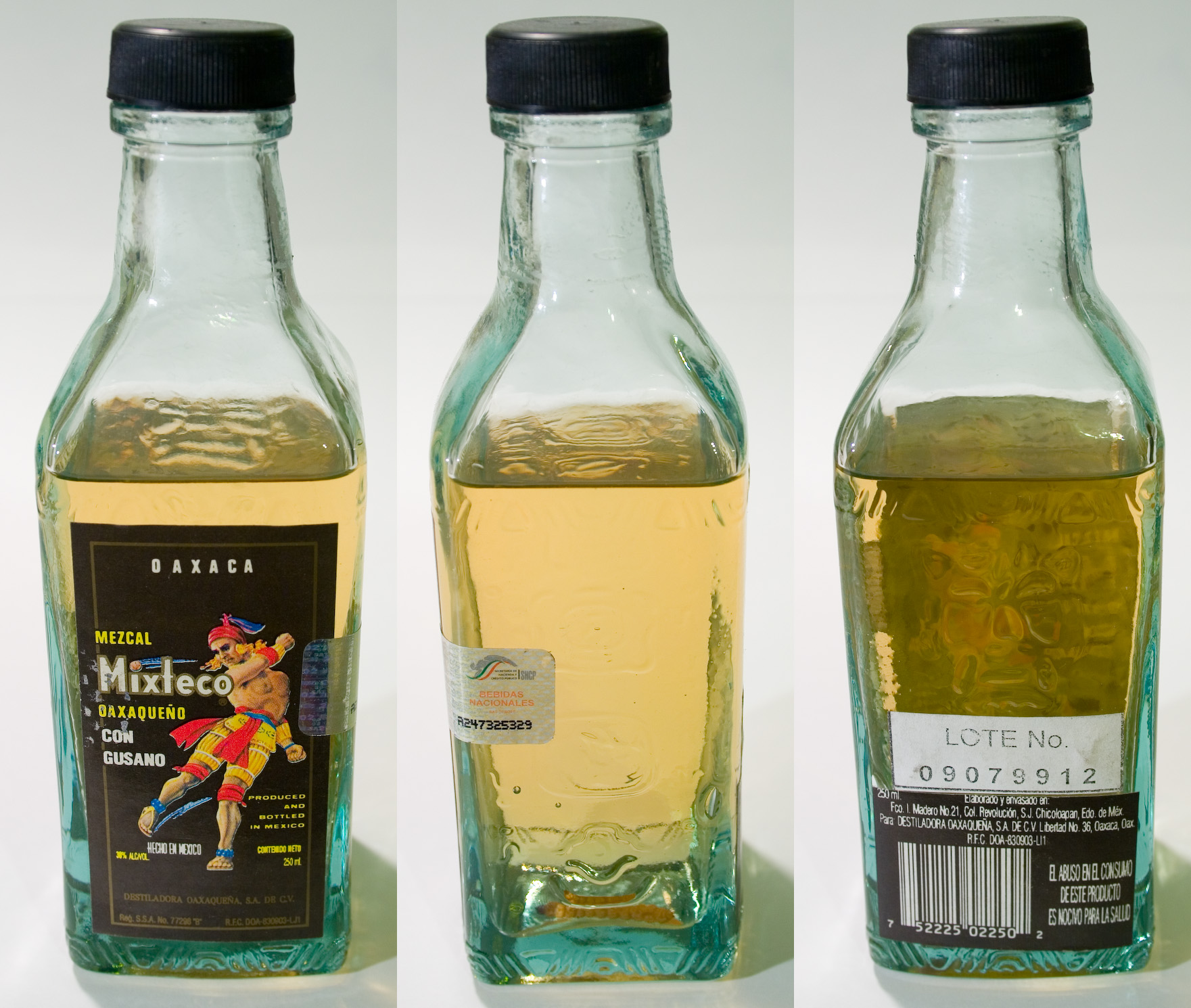
Various views of a bottle of mezcal. The "worm", which is actually the larval form of the moth Hypopta agavis that lives on the agave plant, can be seen in the middle image, at the bottom of the bottle.

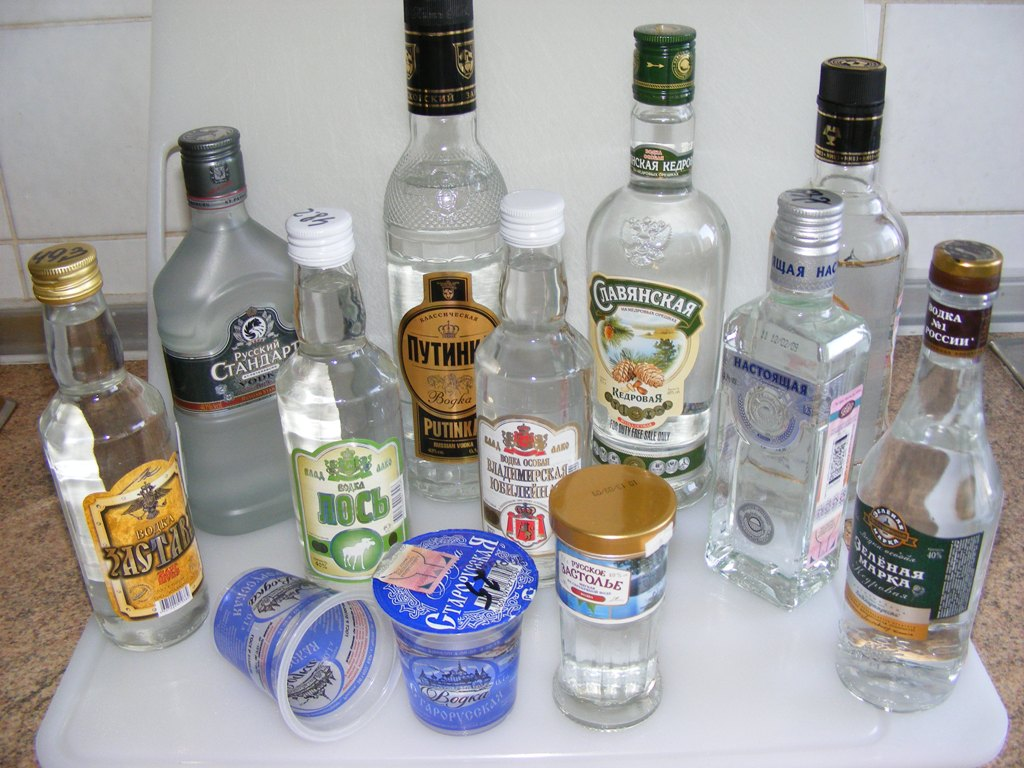
Various bottles and containers of Russian vodka

=== Definition ===
A distilled beverage, spirit drink, or liquor is an alcoholic drink containing ethanol that is produced by distillation (i.e., concentrating by distillation) of ethanol produced by means of fermenting grains, fruits, botanicals, vegetables, seeds, or roots. Vodka, gin, baijiu, shōchū, soju, tequila, rum, whisky, brandy, and singani are examples of distilled drinks. Beer, wine, cider, sake, and huangjiu are examples of fermented drinks.

Hard liquor is used in North America, and India, to distinguish distilled drinks from undistilled ones, and to suggest that undistilled are implicitly weaker.

=== List of liquors ===
The following are liquors being produced around the world (by type, then alphabetically):

==== Cane sugar, sugar beet and honey distillations ====
- Arrack
- Cachaça
- Desi daru
- Horilka
- Rum
  - Puncheon rum
- Rhum agricole (from French Caribbean islands)
- Tuzemák

==== Fruit distillations ====
- Apple distillations
  - Applejack
- Fruit brandy distillations
  - Pálenka - Slivovice, Hruškovice, Bezovice,....
  - Borovička - Juniper
  - Calvados
  - Lambig
  - Eau-de-vie (French origin)
  - Kirsch
  - Rakia
  - Schnapps - fruit brandy
  - Medronho
- Date distillations
  - Aragh Sagi
- Grape distillations
  - Brandy
    - Armagnac
    - Cognac
    - Metaxa
    - Törkölypálinka
    - Singani
  - Pisco (Peru; Chile)
- Pear distillations
  - Poire Williams
    - Williamine - brand of Poire Williams made from Williamine pears
- Plum distillations
  - Damassine
  - Slivovitz
  - Ţuică
- Raspberry distillations
  - Chambord
  - Himbeergeist

==== Grain-based distillations ====
- Barley distillations
  - Gin
  - ManX Spirit (United kingdom)
  - London dry gin
  - Whisky
    - Irish whiskey
    - Japanese whisky
    - Scotch whisky, also known as Scottish whiskey, scotch
- maize-corn distillations
  - American Whiskey
    - Bourbon whiskey, also known as Kentucky whiskey, bourbon (United States)
    - Tennessee whiskey
    - Texas whiskey
  - Canadian whisky
- Quinoa distillations
  - American whiskey
- Oat distillations
  - Whiskey
    - American Whiskey
- Malt distillations
  - Jenever
  - Gin
    - Damson gin
    - Sloe gin (England)
- Rice distillations
  - Awamori (Japan)
  - Baijiu (China)
  - Soju (Korea)
  - Mirin (Japan)
  - Shōchū (Japan)
  - Langkau (Malaysia)
  - Montoku (Malaysia)
- Rye distillations
  - Horilka
  - Rye Whiskey
- Sorghum distillations
  - Baijiu, also known as Shaojiu (China)
    - Maotai
    - Kaoliang liquor, a sorghum liquor
- Wheat distillations
  - Horilka
  - Vodka
- Unspecified or multiple grain distillations
  - Neutral grain spirit

==== Herbal distillations ====
- Absinthe
- Herbsaint
- Schnapps
- Geist

==== Plant-based distillations ====
- Agave distillations
  - Mezcal
  - Tequila

==== Seed or botanical distillations ====
Where the seed or botanical is the dominant flavorant:

- Anise distillations
  - Absinthe
  - Akvavit
  - Arak
  - Rakı
- Coconut flower distillations
  - Arrack
- Gin
- Geist

==== Tree distillations ====
- Palm tree distillations
  - Ogogoro (Nigeria)
- Birch tree distillations
  - Freya Birch Spirit (Norway)

==== Vegetable distillations ====
- Potato distillations
  - Akvavit
  - Horilka
  - Vodka

==== Complex or multiple distillations ====
- Mamajuana
- Poitín
- Shōchū
- Baijiu
- Soju

== See also ==
- Alcoholic coffee drink
- List of cocktails
- List of coffee beverages
- List of national drinks
- List of national liquors
- List of tequilas
- List of U.S. state beverages
- List of vodka brands
- List of whisky brands
