= List of countries by alcohol consumption per capita =

== World Health Organization (WHO) data ==
The World Health Organization periodically publishes The Global Status Report on Alcohol:

- The report was first published by WHO in 1999 with data from 1996.
- The second report was released in 2004, published with data from 2003.
- The third report was published in 2011, with data from 2010.
- The fourth global report was published in 2014, using data from 2010.
- The fifth global report was published in 2018, with data from 2016.
- The sixth global report was published in 2024, with data from 2019.

== Worldwide ==
Percentage of current drinkers among the total population (15+ years)
2000	2005	2010	2016	2019
47.6%	45.1%	45.5%	43%	44%

== Countries ==
Worldwide annual consumption in 2019 was equal to 5.5 litres of pure alcohol consumed per person aged 15 years or older. This is a decrease from the 5.7 litres in 2010. Distilled alcoholic beverages are the most consumed, followed by beer and wines. The regions with the highest consumption are the WHO European Region (9.2 litres) and the Region of the Americas (7.5 litres). |+Recorded annual consumption of pure alcohol (litres) per person 15 years of age and over

Country	1996	2016	2019 (Note: Three year average of 2017, 2018, and 2019)
Afghanistan	–	0.2	0.2
Albania	2.59	7.5	5.1
Algeria	0.27	0.9	0.6
Andorra	–	11.3	11.1
Angola	1.58	6.4	6.2
Antigua and Barbuda	–	7.0	8.5
Argentina	9.58	9.8	8.0
Armenia	0.84	5.5	5.0
Australia	9.55	10.6	10.1
Austria	11.90	11.6	12.0
Azerbaijan	4.16	0.8	2.0
Bahamas	–	4.4	4.4
Bahrain	–	1.9	1.6
Bangladesh	–	0.0	0.1
Barbados	8.37	9.6	9.5
Bhutan	–	0.6	0.2
Belarus	8.14	11.2	10.9
Belgium	10.94	12.1	10.3
Belize	5.85	6.7	5.7
Benin	1.39	3.0	8.3
Bolivia	3.35	4.8	4.1
Bosnia and Herzegovina	8.25	6.4	6.4
Botswana	2.68	8.4	8.2
Brazil	5.57	7.8	7.7
Brunei	0.75	0.4	0.4
Bulgaria	9.52	12.7	11.9
Burkina Faso	0.45	8.2	9.8
Burundi	1.17	7.5	4.1
Cambodia	0.34	6.7	8.5
Cameroon	1.58	8.9	10.1
Canada	7.52	8.9	9.9
Cape Verde	3.86	5.7	6.3
Central African Republic	0.70	3.3	2.0
Chad	0.23	1.5	3.7
Chile	7.06	9.3	6.7
China	5.39	7.2	5.7
Colombia	6.41	5.8	4.9
Comoros	–	0.9	0.3
Congo	1.56	7.8	6.4
Cook Islands	–	10.6	10.6
Costa Rica	5.72	4.8	3.5
Ivory Coast	1.43	8.4	2.8
Croatia	11.75	8.9	8.5
Cuba	3.53	6.1	6.0
Cyprus	10.00	10.8	8.1
Czech Republic	14.35	14.4	13.3
Denmark	12.15	10.4	9.4
Djibouti	0.47	0.5	0.4
Dominica	–	8.2	6.1
Dominican Republic	5.90	6.9	6.8
DR Congo	0.21	2.6	2.1
Ecuador	1.66	4.4	3.3
Egypt	0.53	0.4	0.1
Equatorial Guinea	–	11.3	6.9
El Salvador	2.54	3.7	3.3
Eritrea	0.95	1.3	1.2
Estonia (Note: 1996 Estimates for Estonia are from 1995.)	8.07	11.6	11.3
Eswatini (Note: Officially named Swaziland until April 2018)	1.18	9.9	8.1
Ethiopia	1.02	2.8	3.4
Fiji	1.82	3.0	3.4
Finland	8.26	10.7	9.2
France	13.74	12.6	11.3
Gabon	6.76	11.5	7.3
Gambia	0.16	3.8	1.1
Georgia	4.50	9.8	14.3
Germany	11.67	13.4	12.2
Ghana	0.41	2.7	4.5
Greece	10.41	10.4	7.1
Grenada	–	9.3	8.1
Guatemala	1.99	2.4	1.6
Guinea	0.17	1.3	0.5
Guinea-Bissau	1.59	4.8	4.1
Guyana	14.03	6.3	5.3
Haiti	6.55	5.8	3.5
Honduras	2.41	4.0	3.2
Hungary	12.85	11.4	10.6
Iceland	4.88	9.1	8.1
India	0.99	5.7	4.9
Indonesia	0.13	0.8	0.1
Iran	–	1.0	0.7
Iraq	0.61	0.4	0.2
Ireland	11.90	13.0	11.7
Israel	1.75	3.8	3.0
Italy	9.62	7.5	8.0
Jamaica	3.90	4.2	3.6
Japan	7.85	8.0	6.7
Jordan	–	0.7	0.3
Kazakhstan	7.71	7.7	4.5
Kenya	1.66	3.4	2.9
Kiribati	–	0.4	0.8
Kuwait	–	0.0	0.1
Kyrgyzstan	2.20	6.2	5.0
Laos	4.12	10.4	11.5
Latvia	8.70	12.9	13.1
Lebanon	5.43	1.5	1.5
Lesotho	1.12	5.0	4.5
Liberia	5.68	5.8	3.6
Libya	–	0.0	0.1
Lithuania	6.23	15.0	11.8
Luxembourg	14.35	13.0	11.5
Macedonia	4.86	8.1	4.6
Madagascar	1.25	1.9	1.0
Malawi	0.42	3.7	3.2
Malaysia	0.87	0.9	0.8
Maldives	2.08	2.7	1.4
Mali	–	1.3	4.3
Malta	6.91	8.1	8.5
Mauritania	–	0.0	0.1
Mauritius	4.33	3.6	7.5
Mexico	5.04	6.5	5.7
Federated States of Micronesia	–	2.5	2.1
Moldova	8.62	15.2	11.4
Mongolia	1.95	7.4	7.9
Montenegro	–	8.0	10.3
Morocco	0.58	0.6	0.5
Mozambique	0.45	2.4	2.0
Myanmar	0.21	4.8	2.1
Namibia	–	9.8	5.9
Nauru	–	6.0	2.9
Nepal	–	2.0	1.4
Netherlands	9.80	8.7	9.3
Netherlands Antilles	8.78	–	–
New Caledonia	11.26	–	–
New Zealand	8.85	10.7	9.9
Nicaragua	2.34	5.2	4.2
Niger	–	0.5	0.1
Nigeria	0.66	13.4	4.2
Niue	–	7.0	9.3
North Korea	2.56	3.9	4.3
Norway	4.97	7.5	6.8
Oman	–	0.8	0.9
Pakistan	–	0.3	0.1
Panama	5.74	7.9	6.6
Papua New Guinea	1.02	1.2	1.7
Paraguay	9.71	7.2	5.6
Peru	4.00	6.3	7.5
Philippines	6.77	6.6	6.2
Poland	7.93	11.6	11.6
Portugal	20.57	12.3	10.4
Qatar	–	2.0	1.1
Romania	10.88	12.6	17.0
Russia	8.08	11.7	10.4
Rwanda	0.71	9.0	1.9
Saint Kitts and Nevis	–	9.4	6.3
Saint Lucia	–	9.9	9.5
Saint Vincent and the Grenadines	–	8.2	7.2
Samoa	–	2.5	2.4
São Tomé and Príncipe	–	6.8	5.0
Saudi Arabia	–	0.2	0.1
Senegal	0.41	0.7	0.4
Serbia	–	11.1	7.9
Seychelles	–	13.8	12.0
Sierra Leone	–	5.7	0.3
Singapore	2.10	2.5	1.9
Slovakia	13.00	11.5	10.5
Slovenia	15.15	12.6	11.0
Solomon Islands	0.56	1.4	1.6
Somalia	–	0.0	0.1
South Africa	7.72	9.3	8.8
South Korea	14.40	10.2	8.2
Spain	11.09	10.0	10.9
Sri Lanka	0.21	4.3	2.8
Sudan	0.26	0.5	0.1
Suriname	4.68	5.1	6.6
Syria	0.21	0.3	0.2
Sweden	6.04	9.2	9.3
Switzerland	11.27	11.5	10.4
Tajikistan	1.78	3.3	0.9
Tanzania	0.60	9.4	10.4
Thailand	8.64	8.3	7.8
Timor-Leste	–	2.1	0.4
Togo	1.01	3.1	1.4
Tonga	–	1.5	0.4
Trinidad and Tobago	3.69	8.4	6.1
Tunisia	0.89	1.9	2.0
Turkey	1.35	2.0	1.8
Turkmenistan	1.17	5.4	2.9
Tuvalu	–	1.7	1.2
Uganda	0.46	9.5	12.2
Ukraine	2.31	8.6	8.7
United Arab Emirates	3.06	3.8	2.4
United Kingdom	–	11.4	10.8
United States	8.90	9.8	9.6
Uruguay	8.17	10.8	5.5
Uzbekistan	1.55	2.7	2.6
Vanuatu	0.96	1.0	1.9
Venezuela	9.41	5.6	3.0
Vietnam	1.21	8.3	9.3
Yemen	0.15	0.1	0.1
Zambia	0.63	4.8	3.9
Zimbabwe	2.78	4.8	3.6

== Consumption by type of alcoholic beverage (2019 data) ==
The table below for 189 countries uses 2019 data (three-year average of 2017, 2018, and 2019) from the WHO report published in 2024. The recorded consumption values were based on data from government sources, statistics from economic operators, and FAOSTAT data and estimates the amount of alcohol consumption (in litres of pure alcohol) by persons 15 years of age or older. Unrecorded consumption (homebrew, moonshine, smuggled alcohol, surrogate alcohol etc.) was estimated using expert judgements and surveys. The total consumption (sum of recorded and unrecorded) is then broken down by type of alcoholic beverage. Beer refers to malt beer, wine refers to grape wine, spirits refers to all distilled beverages such as vodka and similar products, and the column "other" refers to all other alcoholic beverages, such as rice wine, soju, sake, mead, kumis, cider, kvass, and African beers (kumi kumi, kwete, banana beer, millet beer, umqombothi etc.). The last two columns represent projections for total consumption (sum of recorded and unrecorded) for the years 2025 and 2030, which are estimated using an ARIMA regression analyses.

Recorded consumption of pure alcohol (litres) per person 15 years of age and over in the year 2019
Country	Recorded consumption	Unrecorded consumption	Beer (%)	Wine (%)	Spirits (%)	Other (%)	2025 projection	2030 projection
Estonia	11.8	1.1	35.3	16.9	38.2	9.7	11.1	12.2
Lithuania	11.0	0.8	42.5	7.7	45.2	4.6	11.7	12.1
Czech Republic	12.9	0.4	52.7	21.8	25.4	<0.1	13.4	13.2
Seychelles	13.3	0.5	42.0	20.8	33.7	3.5	12.1	11.7
Germany	11.1	0.4	50.5	29.9	19.6	<0.1	12.1	11.6
Nigeria	2.9	1.3	22.1	0.8	13.0	64.1	4.1	3.7
Ireland	11.1	0.3	45.4	26.4	20.6	7.6	11.5	10.8
Moldova	6.3	4.8	24.2	37.6	35.8	2.5	11.3	12.3
Latvia	12.9	1.5	40.1	12.1	40.6	7.2	13.1	14.3
Bulgaria	11.4	0.6	40.1	16.3	41.7	1.9	12.0	12.4
France	11.5	0.4	21.1	56.8	20.5	1.6	11.3	10.7
Romania	10.7	6.2	49.7	30.6	19.6	<0.1	16.9	17.5
Slovenia	10.4	0.6	44.2	44.9	10.9	<0.1	11.6	11.1
Portugal	10.2	0.6	25.6	57.7	13.0	3.7	10.6	10.1
Luxembourg	11.3	0.2	35.6	43.6	20.1	0.8	11.5	10.9
Belgium	9.2	0.4	47.6	37.0	12.0	3.4	10.2	9.8
Russia	7.1	3.3	41.4	15.5	43.1	<0.1	10.4	9.8
Austria	11.7	0.4	52.7	31.1	16.2	<0.1	12.2	11.7
Poland	10.7	1.4	54.2	8.1	37.7	<0.1	11.8	12.5
Gabon	6.6	0.7	81.3	7.9	10.1	0.7	7.0	6.4
Slovakia	10.3	0.6	35.9	22.9	41.2	<0.1	11.3	11.2
Switzerland	9.2	0.4	33.9	46.2	18.6	1.3	10.6	10.0
Hungary	11.0	0.6	37.3	28.7	34.0	<0.1	10.4	10.4
United Kingdom	9.8	0.5	35.4	34.6	23.6	6.4	10.8	10.5
Andorra	11.1	0.4	31.7	45.5	21.1	1.7	11.1	10.7
Equatorial Guinea	6.2	0.8	62.5	18.0	18.6	0.9	7.3	7.4
Belarus	10.1	0.6	21.3	9.0	45.0	24.7	11.3	10.7
Serbia	6.9	0.8	43.8	19.0	33.8	3.4	7.9	7.3
Cyprus	7.9	0.6	30.6	27.9	41.6	<0.1	8.0	8.0
Uruguay	5.2	0.4	37.4	48.2	14.4	<0.1	5.5	5.0
Finland	8.3	0.5	47.2	20.3	16.8	15.7	9.1	8.9
New Zealand	9.1	0.5	37.1	32.3	17.1	13.5	9.9	9.9
Australia	9.5	0.4	38.9	38.9	13.6	8.6	10.1	9.9
Cook Islands	12.6	0.6	28.8	15.1	56.1	<0.1	10.6	12.5
Denmark	9.2	0.4	37.2	44.9	17.9	<0.1	9.3	8.7
Greece	6.6	0.7	32.0	44.0	22.5	1.5	6.9	6.5
Laos	7.4	4.2	49.8	0.5	49.7	<0.1	12.2	13.1
South Korea	7.8	0.4	22.3	2.0	2.8	73.0	8.1	7.4
Spain	10.7	0.5	43.2	33.5	21.6	1.7	11.0	11.0
Eswatini	7.1	1.1	34.7	1.0	2.3	62.0	8.1	7.8
Saint Lucia	10.2	0.5	32.7	11.1	49.7	6.6	10.2	10.2
Argentina	7.6	0.4	42.9	37.4	9.1	9.6	7.6	8.0
Georgia	7.6	6.7	24.3	41.8	33.6	0.3	15.0	15.3
Namibia	5.0	0.9	28.4	41.7	11.9	18.0	5.7	6.1
United States	8.9	0.4	44.9	18.2	36.9	<0.1	9.6	9.8
Barbados	10.0	0.5	36.5	14.0	47.9	1.7	9.5	10.5
Uganda	6.6	5.6	12.9	0.2	9.2	77.7	12.0	9.9
Saint Kitts and Nevis	8.8	0.4	42.6	11.5	43.6	2.3	6.5	6.6
Tanzania	5.1	5.3	14.0	0.3	7.1	78.6	10.4	10.3
Chile	6.4	0.4	48.9	25.8	25.3	<0.1	7.5	7.9
Grenada	8.5	0.5	41.4	5.6	49.4	3.6	8.2	8.4
South Africa	7.4	1.4	56.3	17.7	16.1	9.9	8.9	8.9
Sweden	7.1	2.2	37.0	47.2	14.0	1.8	9.3	9.4
Iceland	7.7	0.5	56.2	27.6	16.2	<0.1	7.9	8.4
Rwanda	1.3	0.5	47.9	2.0	11.3	38.8	3.0	4.0
Cameroon	4.0	6.1	58.6	2.6	0.2	38.5	10.0	10.1
Canada	8.1	1.9	44.3	25.7	26.0	4.0	9.8	10.0
Croatia	10.1	0.7	47.3	35.1	13.4	4.2	8.5	8.1
Netherlands	8.3	0.5	48.1	35.3	16.6	<0.1	9.2	8.7
Ukraine	5.5	3.2	46.0	5.5	47.6	0.9	9.0	8.8
Botswana	7.4	0.8	41.0	4.9	11.1	42.9	8.5	8.6
Ivory Coast	1.9	0.9	56.3	18.8	8.6	16.2	2.9	2.8
Trinidad and Tobago	5.7	0.4	52.1	2.0	44.2	1.7	6.3	6.7
Thailand	6.7	1.2	29.5	2.4	68.0	<0.1	8.0	7.7
Vietnam	3.4	5.9	92.4	0.6	6.8	0.2	9.3	10.7
Burkina Faso	7.2	2.6	14.5	0.9	3.2	81.4	9.9	10.9
Dominica	6.3	0.5	28.7	4.6	65.7	1.1	5.8	5.3
Saint Vincent and the Grenadines	7.6	<0.1	34.2	3.7	59.1	3.0	7.1	8.1
Malta	9.0	0.5	42.0	26.3	25.7	5.9	8.5	9.8
North Macedonia	4.0	0.8	51.5	25.6	21.9	1.0	4.7	4.9
Japan	6.4	0.2	21.0	6.1	15.0	57.9	6.6	6.3
Montenegro	9.8	0.7	38.3	26.3	32.2	3.2	10.4	10.4
Panama	6.3	0.4	79.3	1.0	19.3	0.4	6.5	6.8
Brazil	6.3	1.4	63.1	3.8	32.7	0.4	7.6	12.1
Congo	5.6	0.8	90.1	1.3	8.4	0.2	6.2	7.9
Kazakhstan	3.9	0.7	61.5	4.3	34.1	<0.1	4.4	4.2
Albania	4.4	0.7	39.6	24.5	34.1	1.8	5.1	5.4
Burundi	3.1	1.0	60.2	0.1	0.1	39.5	4.1	3.4
Italy	7.6	0.5	25.7	63.7	10.5	<0.1	8.0	7.5
Norway	6.0	0.5	43.8	36.6	16.5	3.0	6.8	6.9
Mongolia	7.2	0.7	29.9	20.4	49.8	<0.1	7.8	8.0
China	4.8	0.9	28.4	3.0	68.5	<0.1	5.0	5.5
Paraguay	5.3	0.5	56.8	11.4	30.4	1.4	5.6	5.7
Antigua and Barbuda	11.2	0.4	26.3	32.8	37.6	3.3	8.5	9.8
Niue	8.5	0.8	50.4	22.2	27.4	<0.1	9.3	10.5
Dominican Republic	5.6	1.3	56.0	3.2	39.7	1.0	6.9	6.5
São Tomé and Príncipe	4.2	0.8	17.1	77.4	5.4	<0.1	5.2	5.0
Belize	5.9	0.5	64.9	11.1	21.5	2.5	5.6	5.9
Cambodia	4.5	4.0	90.7	0.2	9.1	<0.1	8.7	11.0
Philippines	5.0	1.2	28.5	0.7	70.6	0.2	6.2	6.3
Mexico	4.8	1.2	85.3	3.8	10.5	0.4	5.8	5.8
Angola	5.3	0.9	54.5	7.8	35.0	2.8	5.4	5.7
Bosnia and Herzegovina	5.3	0.9	76.2	9.2	11.4	3.1	6.3	6.8
Guyana	5.2	0.2	53.1	0.7	45.7	0.5	5.3	5.3
Peru	5.7	1.8	53.5	7.9	38.4	0.2	7.3	7.8
Kyrgyzstan	4.4	0.5	10.2	5.7	84.1	<0.1	4.5	4.7
Cuba	4.7	1.3	37.8	4.7	57.2	0.3	6.0	6.3
Nauru	2.4	0.5	22.0	3.7	74.3	<0.1	2.9	2.8
Colombia	4.2	0.7	73.8	1.4	24.3	0.4	4.9	4.8
Haiti	3.0	0.4	17.2	0.9	81.7	0.2	3.2	3.1
Liberia	2.8	0.8	14.1	1.6	83.7	0.5	3.5	3.4
Cape Verde	1.9	0.9	56.3	18.8	8.6	16.2	2.9	2.8
India	3.0	1.9	7.1	<0.1	92.8	<0.1	5.0	6.7
Sierra Leone	0.2	<0.1	68.0	6.6	21.1	4.3	0.3	0.3
Venezuela	2.7	0.3	58.5	0.5	39.6	1.4	2.4	1.8
Armenia	4.1	0.9	20.3	9.5	70.0	0.2	5.2	5.7
Turkmenistan	2.9	<0.1	23.1	40.3	36.6	<0.1	2.8	3.1
Nicaragua	3.7	0.5	41.0	0.8	58.1	0.1	4.0	4.1
Suriname	6.3	0.4	53.9	2.7	41.0	2.3	7.1	8.2
Lesotho	3.5	1.0	54.7	2.9	8.9	33.5	4.5	5.3
Bolivia	3.0	1.1	74.4	4.3	18.6	2.6	4.0	4.3
Costa Rica	3.2	0.3	72.3	4.9	10.4	12.4	3.3	3.1
Guinea-Bissau	3.3	0.9	15.4	33.6	15.8	35.1	3.9	4.1
Myanmar	1.9	0.2	26.9	0.9	72.1	<0.1	2.4	3.4
Zambia	3.2	0.6	37.9	1.4	8.5	52.2	3.8	3.8
Zimbabwe	2.8	0.9	34.1	1.9	12.3	51.7	3.9	4.6
Bahamas	9.5	0.3	38.7	15.3	42.8	3.2	4.4	4.3
Ecuador	3.0	0.3	76.8	2.7	19.4	1.0	3.3	3.1
Sri Lanka	2.6	0.3	8.5	0.3	89.8	1.4	2.8	3.3
Jamaica	3.5	0.4	34.6	8.3	47.3	9.7	3.6	3.6
Honduras	2.8	0.4	57.5	1.3	41.1	0.1	3.2	3.4
North Korea	3.4	0.9	3.2	<0.1	96.8	<0.1	4.3	4.5
Gambia	0.9	0.3	17.9	<0.1	1.8	80.3	0.9	0.6
Israel	2.6	0.4	49.3	3.0	45.1	2.5	3.0	3.1
United Arab Emirates	2.1	0.4	10.5	7.0	81.4	1.0	2.3	2.5
El Salvador	2.9	0.4	50.9	1.9	47.0	0.2	3.4	3.5
Malawi	1.8	1.5	4.2	0.8	9.5	85.5	3.4	3.5
Mauritius	7.0	0.8	28.6	3.7	67.1	0.5	7.6	7.4
Kenya	2.3	0.6	32.1	1.2	35.1	31.6	2.8	3.2
Central African Republic	1.4	0.5	36.6	1.8	1.0	60.6	2.0	1.9
Tajikistan	0.9	<0.1	44.0	1.3	54.2	0.5	0.8	0.8
Togo	1.0	0.4	63.1	1.1	20.1	15.6	1.4	1.4
Benin	5.2	3.2	17.0	0.9	4.0	78.1	8.7	8.5
Fiji	3.0	0.7	53.9	9.1	37.0	<0.1	3.8	4.3
Ethiopia	1.8	1.5	55.9	0.1	9.7	34.3	3.7	5.1
Ghana	1.9	2.7	34.5	2.0	21.3	42.2	4.5	4.5
Maldives	1.3	0.4	22.9	40.9	36.0	0.2	1.5	1.4
Uzbekistan	2.6	<0.1	7.8	3.3	88.8	<0.1	2.5	2.8
DR Congo	1.1	1.0	48.6	0.8	3.6	47.1	2.0	1.4
Federated States of Micronesia	1.6	0.6	58.5	8.5	33.0	<0.1	2.1	1.9
Samoa	1.9	0.7	82.3	8.7	9.1	<0.1	2.4	2.2
Guatemala	1.6	<0.1	55.1	3.0	41.5	0.4	1.6	1.5
Mozambique	1.5	0.6	72.1	10.4	14.4	3.2	2.1	2.5
Timor-Leste	0.3	<0.1	69.1	12.8	17.3	0.8	0.2	0.2
Nepal	0.8	0.6	28.3	0.6	71.1	<0.1	1.5	1.6
Qatar	1.0	0.2	29.6	7.8	62.0	0.6	1.1	1.3
Singapore	1.8	0.2	69.0	15.4	13.7	2.0	1.9	1.8
Turkey	1.3	0.6	56.8	12.3	30.8	<0.1	1.7	1.6
Bahrain	1.5	0.4	37.6	12.1	48.7	1.6	1.6	1.3
Madagascar	0.7	0.3	68.6	9.5	21.8	<0.1	1.0	0.9
Tunisia	2.0	0.6	62.1	26.5	9.9	1.5	2.0	2.1
Tuvalu	0.9	0.3	1.5	74.3	24.2	<0.1	1.2	1.5
Chad	0.5	3.2	69.7	0.8	0.9	28.7	3.5	4.2
Lebanon	1.2	0.3	32.3	18.1	48.3	1.4	1.5	1.3
Tonga	0.3	0.1	4.3	60.3	35.4	<0.1	0.4	0.5
Solomon Islands	1.2	0.5	71.3	4.5	24.2	<0.1	1.6	1.2
Eritrea	0.9	0.4	42.0	<0.1	<0.1	58.0	1.2	1.6
Guinea	0.3	0.1	92.2	3.6	4.2	<0.1	0.5	0.6
Mali	3.5	0.8	2.7	0.2	0.4	96.7	4.3	4.1
Papua New Guinea	1.2	0.5	45.8	4.7	48.6	0.9	1.4	1.4
Iran	0.1	0.6	75.4	<0.1	24.6	<0.1	0.4	<0.1
Vanuatu	1.7	0.6	20.2	24.2	55.5	0.1	2.1	2.6
Algeria	0.6	<0.1	53.5	32.7	13.8	<0.1	0.6	0.8
Comoros	0.2	<0.1	21.7	39.8	38.5	<0.1	0.2	0.4
Malaysia	0.7	0.2	73.0	6.4	19.0	1.7	0.8	0.8
Azerbaijan	0.9	1.0	38.3	13.0	47.9	0.7	2.5	3.9
Indonesia	<0.1	<0.1	78.2	3.2	17.8	0.8	0.1	0.1
Oman	0.5	0.4	34.5	3.5	61.7	0.2	0.9	0.9
Jordan	0.3	<0.1	27.6	1.7	69.3	1.4	0.3	0.2
Senegal	0.3	0.1	66.7	26.3	6.3	0.7	0.4	0.4
Bhutan	<0.1	0.1	11.1	2.4	86.3	0.1	0.2	0.3
Morocco	0.5	<0.1	35.6	46.1	18.0	0.3	0.6	0.6
Djibouti	0.3	0.1	28.1	17.4	53.2	1.2	0.3	0.3
Niger	<0.1	<0.1	41.3	7.9	50.6	0.1	0.1	0.1
Sudan	<0.1	<0.1	27.0	30.9	37.6	4.5	<0.1	<0.1
Brunei	0.7	0.1	100.0	<0.1	<0.1	<0.1	0.4	0.4
Egypt	0.1	<0.1	63.6	7.2	28.3	0.9	0.1	0.2
Iraq	0.2	<0.1	70.3	2.3	26.8	0.7	0.2	0.3
Kiribati	0.4	0.6	64.1	<0.1	35.8	<0.1	0.8	0.7
Pakistan	<0.1	<0.1	7.7	<0.1	68.7	23.6	0.1	0.1
Syria	0.1	<0.1	12.8	1.3	86.0	<0.1	0.2	0.1
Afghanistan	<0.1	<0.1	6.1	4.4	89.1	0.4	<0.1	<0.1
Saudi Arabia	<0.1	<0.1	–	–	–	–	<0.1	<0.1
Yemen	<0.1	<0.1	98.0	<0.1	2.0	<0.1	<0.1	<0.1
Bangladesh	<0.1	<0.1	11.1	2.4	86.3	0.1	<0.1	<0.1
Kuwait	<0.1	<0.1	–	–	–	–	<0.1	<0.1
Libya	<0.1	<0.1	6.8	10.5	32.6	50.2	<0.1	<0.1
Mauritania	<0.1	<0.1	–	–	–	–	<0.1	<0.1
Somalia	<0.1	<0.1	–	–	–	–	<0.1	<0.1

== See also ==
- List of countries by tea consumption per capita
- List of national drinks
