= Cauim =

Prehispanic Brazilian alcoholic beverage

Cauim is a traditional alcoholic beverage or beer of the Indigenous peoples in Brazil since pre-Columbian times. It is still made today in remote areas throughout Panama and South America. Cauim is made by fermenting manioc (a large starchy root), or maize, sometimes flavored with fruit juices. The Guna Indians of Panama use plantains.

In Spanish it is called chicha de yuca or in some places (like Peru) masato. The best term in English may be "Manioc beer". In Kichwa, Lumu Asua. In Shuar, Nijiamanch. In Paicoca, Co'n.

A characteristic feature of the beverage is that the starting material is cooked, chewed, and fermented, so that enzymes (including amylase) present in human saliva can break down the starch into fermentable sugars. (This principle was originally used also for Japanese sake.)

== Preparation and customs ==
=== Historical use among the Tupinambá ===
The following description, largely from Jean de Léry's account of his trip to Brazil in the 16th century applies specifically to the Tupinambá natives who lived along the coast of central Brazil. However, it is typical of other tribes throughout Brazil.

Cauim preparation (like other cooking tasks) is strictly a women's job, with no involvement from the men. Manioc roots are sliced thin, boiled until tender, and allowed to cool down. Then women and girls gather around the pot; each repeatedly takes a mouthful of manioc, chews it, and puts it into a second pot (depending on the culture). Enzymes in the saliva then convert the starch into fermentable sugars. (Men firmly assert that if they were to chew the paste, the resulting beverage would not taste as good; and anyway they consider that work as inappropriate for them as spinning yarn would be for European men.) The chewed root paste is put back on the fire and stirred with a wooden spoon until completely cooked. The paste is then allowed to ferment in large earthenware pots ("half as big as a Burgundy wine barrel").

The resulting beverage is opaque and dense like wine dregs and tastes like sour milk. There are light and dark varieties of cauim, and the beverage can be flavored with various fruits.

The same process is used to make a similar beverage from maize. Since both plants grow abundantly throughout the year, the natives prepare the beverage in any season, sometimes in large quantities. Cauim can be consumed quietly by one or two people, but is most commonly consumed at parties with tens or hundreds of people, often from two or more villages. According to contemporary records, thirty or more large pots of cauim could be consumed in a single party; and "neither the German, nor the Flemish, nor the soldiers, nor the Swiss — that is, none of those people in France who devote themselves to great drinking, will match the Americans in that art." Cauim was also de rigueur in solemn occasions, such as the ceremonial killing and eating of a war prisoner.

Serving the cauim at parties is also a women's task. Cauim is best consumed warm, and so the women will place the pots over a slow fire in the village's central plaza. While keeping the pot well stirred, they will serve the beverage in drinking bowls — holding up to "three Parisian quarts" each — to the dancing men, as they pass by. While men are supposed to empty their bowls in one go (and perhaps twenty bowlfuls in a single party), the women take sips more or less continuously.

A drinking party could go on for two or three days, with music, dancing, whistling, and shouting going on all the time. Sometimes the men would force themselves to throw up in order to continue drinking. Leaving the party would be considered a great shame, "worse than schelm among Germans". Curiously, the Tupinambá do not eat during their drinking parties, just as they do not drink at meals; and they find the European custom of mixing the two things very strange.

Jean de Léry reports that he and his companions tried to prepare "clean" cauim by grinding and cooking manioc or maize, without the chewing step; but (predictably) it did not work. Eventually they got used to the natives' drink. "To those readers who are put off by the idea of drinking what someone else has chewed," adds the traveler, "let me remind them of how our wine is made ... by the peasants who trample on the grapes with their feet, sometimes with shoes and all; things that are perhaps even less agreeable than the chewing of American women. Just as one says that wine, by fermenting, rids itself of all impurity; so we may assume that cauim purges itself too."

=== Current use ===
Cauim is still made by many indigenous communities in Brazil and elsewhere in the Amazon. It is the main staple food for infants of the Tapirapé Indians of the Tapi'itãwa tribe (Mato Grosso state) until they are two years old.

== Analysis ==
Analysis of cauim made from manioc showed that fermentation was due to a large variety of bacteria. As the fermentation progressed, the species Lactobacillus pentosus and L. plantarum became dominant. The acidity of the final product was due to lactic acid but significant amounts of ethanol and acetic acid were present. A second analysis of cauim made from rice and manioc also showed the presence of yeasts, chiefly Candida tropicalis.

== See also ==
- List of saliva-fermented beverages
- Beer style
- Chicha
- List of maize dishes
- Pulque
