= Casiri =

Casiri may refer to:

- Casiri (Arequipa), a mountain in Arequipa Region, Peru
- Casiri (Tacna), a volcano in Tacna Region, Peru

== People with the surname ==
- Miguel Casiri (1710–1791), Lebanese Orientalist

== See also ==
- Kasiri, an alcoholic beverage made from cassava
- Q'asiri (disambiguation)
