= Poirier =

Poirier is a French surname, meaning pear tree (cf. poire). Notable people with the surname include:

- Anne and Patrick Poirier, French artists
- Dustin Poirier, Acadian-American mixed martial arts fighter
- Claude Poirier, French-Canadian television journalist
- Denise Poirier, American voice actress
- Denise Poirier-Rivard, French-Canadian politician from Quebec
- Dominique Poirier, French-Canadian journalist and diplomat
- Ghislain Poirier, French-Canadian DJ and record producer
- Gregory Poirier, American film and television writer, director, and producer
- Jean Poirier, Canadian politician from Ontario
- Jennifer Poirier, American politician from Maine
- Kim Poirier, French-Canadian actress, singer, film producer, and television host
- Luc Poirier, French-Canadian professional wrestler known as Rambo
- Lyne Poirier, French-Canadian judoka
- Manuel Poirier, French film director
- Mark Poirier, American novelist and screenwriter
- Narcisse Poirier, French-Canadian artist
- Normand Poirier, American writer of French-Canadian descent
- Pascal Poirier, French-Canadian author, lawyer, and politician from New Brunswick
- Paul Poirier, Canadian ice dancer
- Richard Poirier, American literary critic
- Robert Poirier, Canadian businessman
- Rose-May Poirier, French-Canadian politician from New Brunswick
- Vincent Poirier, French basketball player

== See also ==
- Poitier
- Poirier's Diner, a historic restaurant in Providence, Rhode Island
