= List of amylase-induced fermentations =

This is a list of amylase-induced fermentations. Saliva can be used as a source of the enzyme amylase to break down complex sugars into simple sugars. These simple sugars can then undergo fermentation by microorganisms. Dual fermentation refers to fermentation by more than one microorganism. Amylase-induced fermented drinks are often made from cassava.

== Cassava ==
- Fermented beverage
  - cauim
  - chicha: Throughout the Amazon Basin, including the interiors of Ecuador, Peru, and Brazil, chicha is made most often with cassava. In Peruvian Amazonia chicha is known as masato.
  - kasiri (Suriname, Brazil, Guyana, Sub-Saharan Africa)
  - nihamanchi (South America), also known as nijimanche (Ecuador, Brazil, and Peru)
  - parakari (Guyana)
  - sakurá (Brazil, Suriname)
- Distilled beverage
  - tiquira (Brazil)

== Rice ==
- Fermented beverage
  - kuchikamizake (Japan)
