= Q'asiri =

Q'asiri (Aymara for bawler, hispanicized spellings Casiri, Kasiri, Khasiri) may refer to:

- Q'asiri (Larecaja), a mountain the Larecaja Province, La Paz Department, Bolivia
- Q'asiri (Murillo), a mountain the Pedro Domingo Murillo Province, La Paz Department, Bolivia

== See also ==
- Casiri (disambiguation)
- Kasiri, an alcoholic beverage made from cassava
