= Parakari =

Fermented alcoholic beverage from Guyana, made of cassava

Parakari is a fermented alcoholic beverage made by Amerindians of Guyana and Venezuela. Like other cassava alcoholic beverages, parakari is made by dual fermenting cassava (a large starchy root), which involves the use of an amylolytic mold (Rhizopus sp., Mucoraceae, Zygomycota) by chewing it.

Parakari is produced by Pemon, Wapishana, Macushi, Patamona tribes, and production was observed among the Wai-wai, but is said to have ceased due to Christian missionary suppression. For the Makushi tribe, parakari making and drinking are an important part of group cohesion and cultural identity.

In a study of the production process in a Wapisiana village, thirty steps were involved in parakari manufacture, including the use of specific cassava varieties, control of culture temperature and boosting of Rhizopus inoculum potential with purified starch additives. The cassava contains high amounts of cyanide and can be deadly if not prepared properly.

To prepare parakari, cassava root is grated and placed in a long, woven strainer to drain out the juice of the cassava. Toxins are rinsed out and the resulting flour is made into bread. The bread used to make parakari is deliberately overcooked, as burning lends the drink its characteristic taste. This bread is then soaked in water, broken up, and placed in a bed of leaves. A powder of dried cassava leaves containing the Rhizopus inoculum is added as well as tapioca starch and dried cassava slices that encourage fermentation. The bread is removed after a number of days and placed a vessel for further fermentation, in which a shorter time will yield a sweeter drink, and a longer time a more bitter, alcoholic drink. This second fermentation can take between 1 day to 5 weeks.

Sarawi is another cassava-based beverage made by the Wapisiana tribe.

== See also ==
- Kasiri
- Nihamanchi
