= Enturire =

Traditional alcoholic drink

Enturire is a traditional alcoholic drink made from fermented sorghum and honey brewed from the Kigezi region in Uganda mainly drunk by the Bakiga.

== Ingredients and traditional production ==
Enturire is made from sorghum, the primary ingredient, and honey, used to sweeten the drink.

Enturire is traditionally prepared by soaking sorghum in water for at least 24 hours and later mixed with ash and left for 3 days. It is thereafter dried to black sweet sorghum, then ground to form flour. The flour is mixed with water to make bushera which is left to undergo fermentation for 3 days and later mixed with unfiltered honey which is mixed with omuramba and left to stay for 3–5 days before it's ready for human consumption.

Enturire after brewing can be consumed up to two months after making.

== Read also ==
- Kwete
- Tonto (beverage)
