= Banana beer =

Alcoholic beverage made from fermentation of mashed bananas

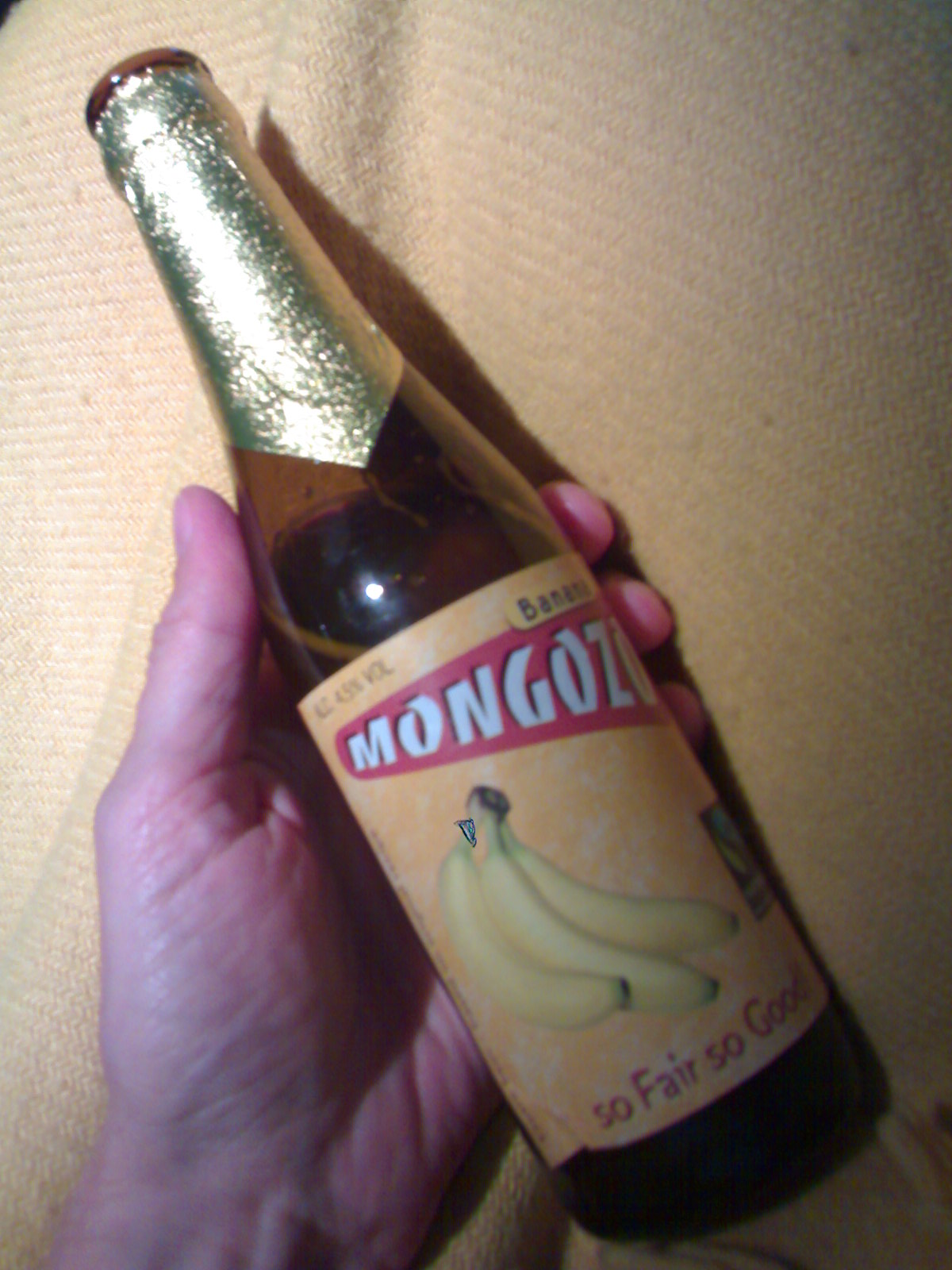
Mongozo banana beer

Banana beer is an alcoholic beverage made from fermentation of mashed bananas. Sorghum, millet or maize flour are added as a source of wild yeast.

== Etymology ==
In Uganda, banana beer is known as mubisi, in DR Congo as Kasiksi, in Kenya as urwaga, and in Rwanda and Burundi as urwagwa.

== Background ==
Banana beer is sometimes consumed during rituals and ceremonies. A similar product called mwenge bigere is made in Uganda with only bananas and sorghum. It can also be found under the names kasiksi, nokrars, rwabitoke, urwedensiya, urwarimu and milinda kaki.

== Production ==
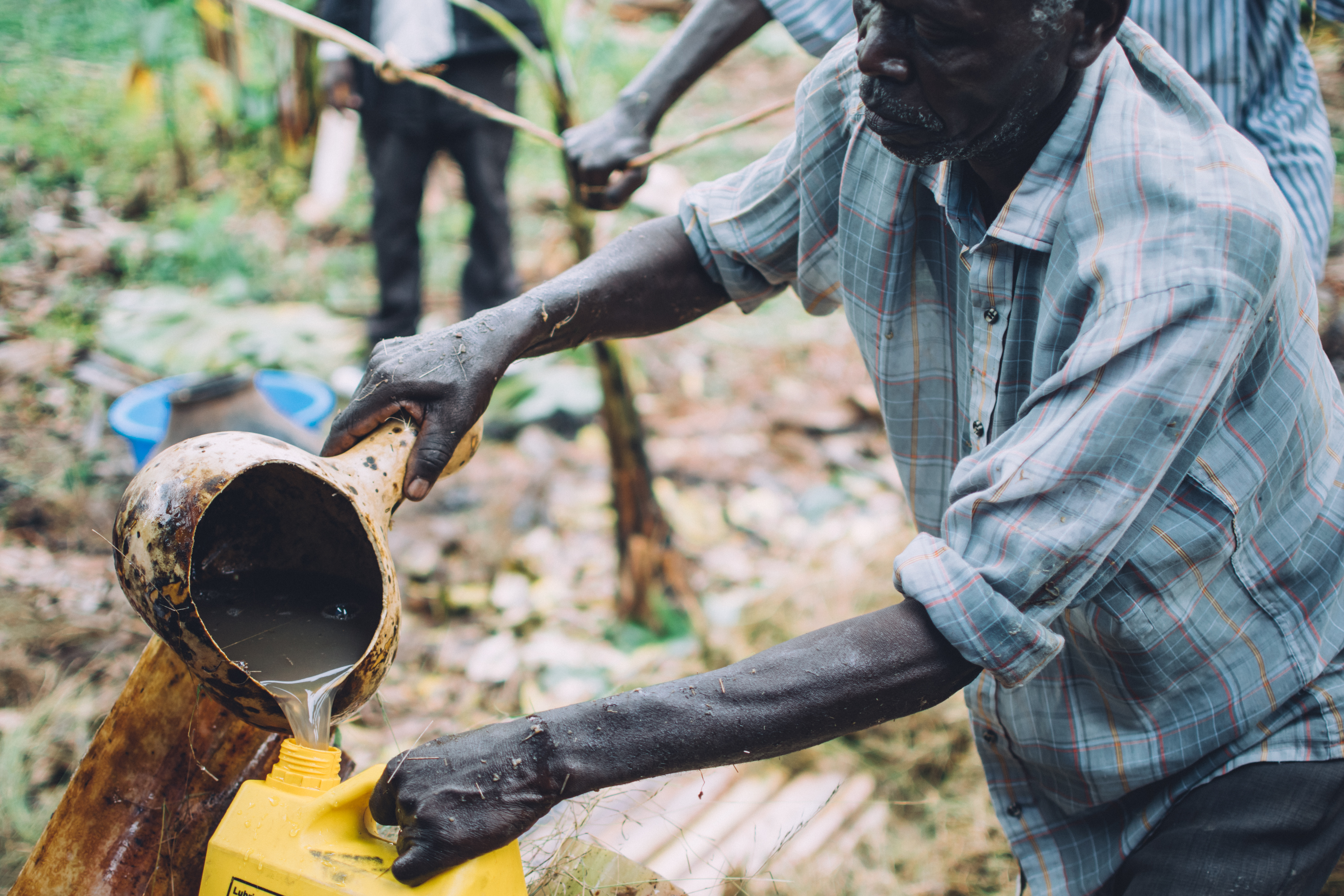
Making local banana beer in Western Uganda

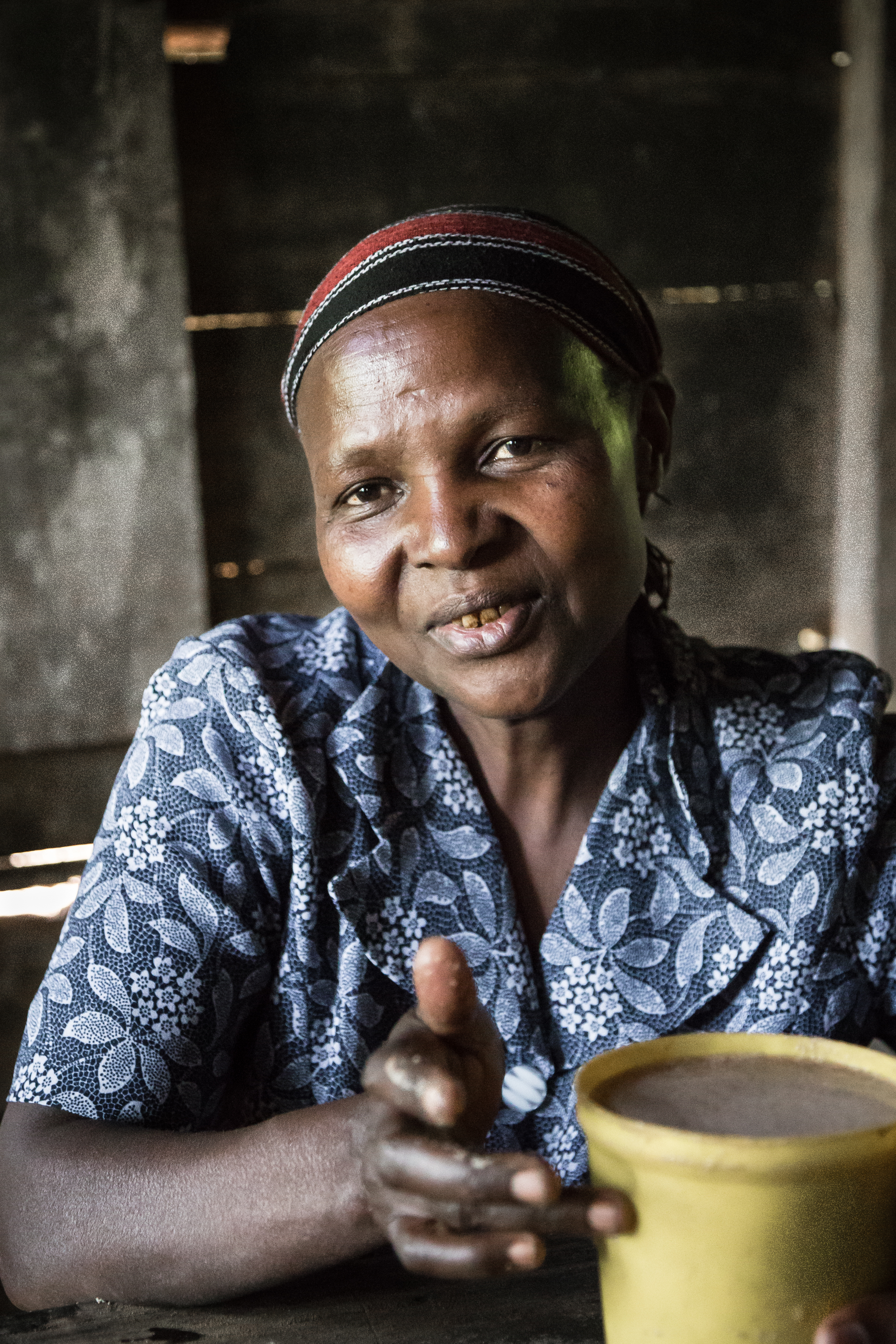
Selling banana beer in Tanzania

Banana beer is made from ripe (but not over-ripe) East African Highland bananas (Musa acuminata Colla (AAA-EA), Mbidde clone set). To accelerate the ripening of bananas, a hole is dug in the ground, lined with dried banana leaves which are then set on fire. Fresh banana leaves are laid on top of them, then the unripe bananas. These are then covered by more fresh banana leaves and pseudostems. After four to six days, the bananas are ripe enough. This method only works in the dry season. During the rainy season, bananas are ripened by putting them on a hurdle near a cooking fire.

Two types of banana are used for banana beer: the harsh tasting igikashi and the milder tasting igisahira. The banana beer mixture consists of one third igikashi and two thirds igisahira. Once ripened, the bananas are peeled. They are not ripe enough if they cannot be peeled by hand. After peeling, the bananas are kneaded until soft. The juice is then filtered to get clear banana juice, which is then diluted with water. Sorghum is ground, lightly roasted, and then added to the juice. This mixture is left to ferment for 24 hours and then filtered.

After filtering, the beer is packaged in glass or plastic bottles. In commercial production, the beer may first be pasteurized before packaging to stop fermentation and extend shelf life.

== Varieties ==
Tanzania has a banana beer called mbege, which is still brewed traditionally.

Commercial brands include:

- Mongozo Banana Beer
- Raha
- Agashya

== See also ==
- Banana wine: another product that can be made from banana
