= Williamine =

Brand of Poire Williams

Williamine is a brand of Poire Williams, an eau de vie produced with Williams pears, in Martigny, Canton of Valais, Switzerland.

The trademark Williamine belongs to the Distillerie Louis Morand & Cie SA.

Williamine's William pears originate from nearby orchards and have been a traditional produce of Valais for over 100 years, exported to many countries.

== See also ==
- Appellation d'origine protégée
