= Merisa =

Fermented beverage

Merisa, merissa or marissa (Arabic: مريسة) is a traditional fermented beverage popular in South Sudan.

It is made by Sudanese women as a source of income. Merisa is made by brewing dates, millet and sorghum. The brewing process has been described as complex by Western beer making standards with over a dozen steps. Merisa has an 8-10 hour fermentation process and has an alcohol content of up to 6%.

It is illegal to drink or sell Marissa in Northern Sudan under Muslim Sharia laws, under penalty of 40 lashes, fines and imprisonment.

Baboons in Sudan are known to drink merisa when offered.
