= Poiré =

Poiré as a surname may refer to:

- Alain Poiré (1917–2000), French film producer
- Alfonso L. Poiré (b. 1963), California attorney
- Emmanuel Poiré, or Caran d'Ache (1858–1909), French satirist
- Jean Poiret, born Jean Poiré (1926–1992), French actor and director
- Jean-Marie Poiré (b. 1945), French film director
- Poirot, a fictional Belgian detective, created by Agatha Christie

== See also ==
- Poiré, the French name for the alcoholic beverage Perry
- Poire Williams, a fruit brandy made from pears
