= Mbege =

Traditional Chagga beverage made from fermented bananas

Mbege, a traditional chagga brew

Mbege is a kind of banana drink traditional to the Chagga ethnic group of Tanzania located in Kilimanjaro region. It is a mildly alcoholic drink made from fermented bananas and finger millet. Making mbege is labor-intensive and time-consuming as the majority of the process is done by hand without the aid of modern technology. The initial taste of mbege is said to be sweet and is followed by a slightly sour aftertaste.

== Process ==
Mbege is the Chagga tribe's heritage beer. To make it, bananas are mashed and then cooked in a cooking pot over a fire for 6 hours. The mixture is then covered and left outside to ferment for up to 7 days. The fermented mixture is strained through shredded grass and banana leaves and a thick porridge made from the flour of finger millet (Eleusine coracana) and water is added to the strained liquid. A small amount of quinine-bark flour is then added to the mixture in order to tone down some of the sweetness of the bananas. It is then left to sit out for another day before it is ready to be consumed. The resultant beverage has an alcohol content of 1–3%, depending on the duration of fermentation. The fermentation enriches Mbege with bioactive metabolites and microbes, such as Saccharomyces cerevisiae and lactobacilli, supplementing the health-promoting compounds naturally present in bananas and millet.

== Health effects ==
A small study, published in the journal Nature, was made comparing African diets with western-type diets. Changes in circulating leukocyte profiles, the inflammatory and cardiometabolic proteome, whole-blood cytokine responses and transcriptome, and plasma metabolome were assessed at baseline, immediately after the intervention and 4 weeks later. Health advantages were found to the African diet. In particular a small cohort who habitually ate a western diet had mbege added for a week. The study found in general that changing from a western to an African diet had significant health benefits. Consumption of mbege, even with a western diet, reduced, among others, neutrophil activation and boosted cytokine responses to Candida. Detailed measurements reported in the paper found that drinking mbege induced a rapid shift in cardiometabolic proteins and a sustained reduction in inflammatory proteins.

The researchers warned that consumption of these fermented beverages should be balanced against risks such as the alcohol content and potential mycotoxin contamination.

== In popular culture ==
- The process of making mbege was featured on Travel Channel's show Bizarre Foods with Andrew Zimmern.
