= Nihamanchi =

Cassava beer

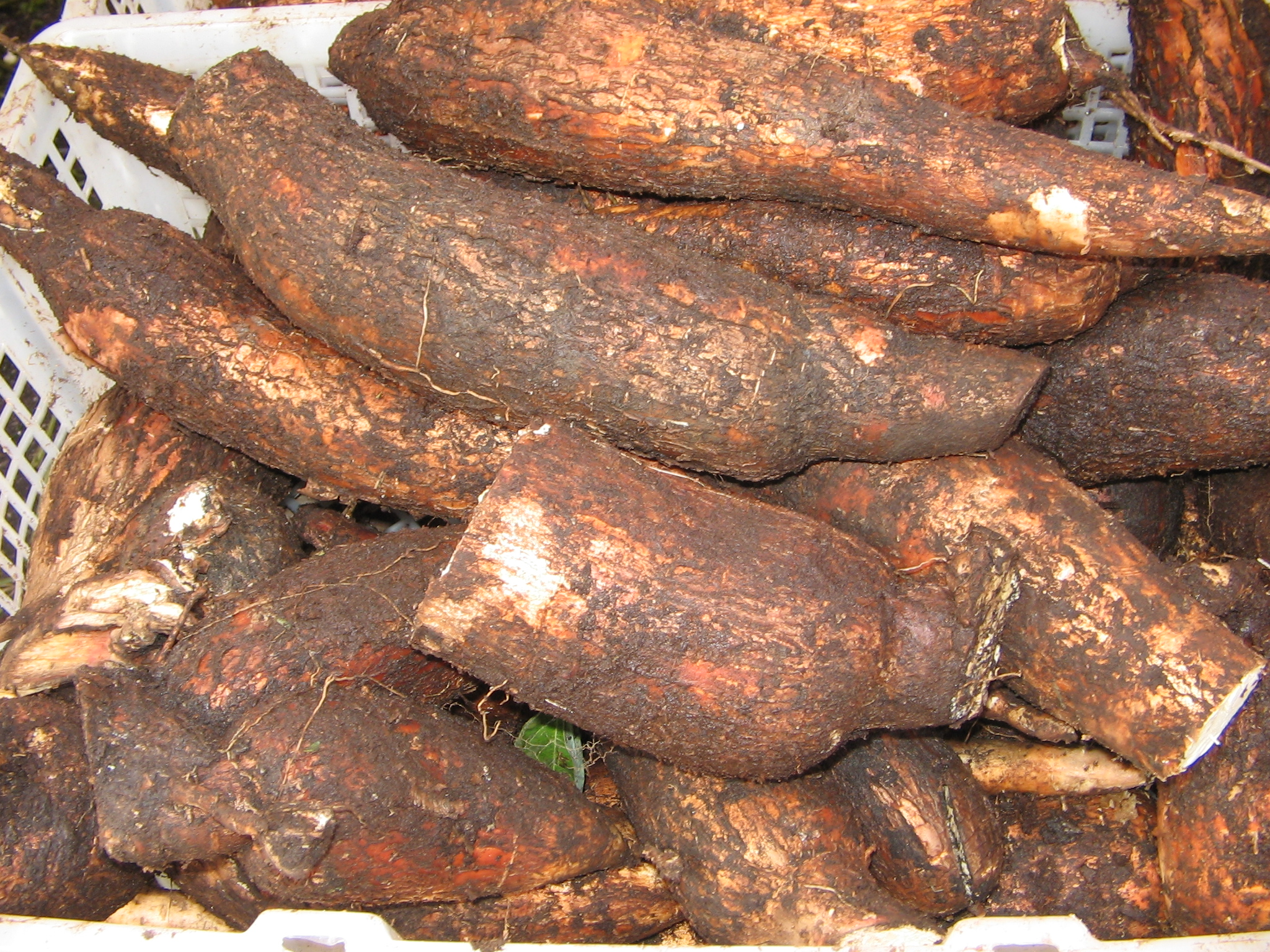
Cassava (Manihot esculenta) tubers

Nihamanchï is a beer brewed from cassava (Manihot esculenta) by indigenous peoples of South America. It is also known as nihamanci, nijimanche, or nijiamanchi, and is related to chicha.

Jívaro women make it by chewing manioc tubers, placing them in large jars, and allowing them to ferment in their saliva. Nijimanche is nutrious, and adults drink 4–5 quarts a day.

The same beverage is made by the Jivaro in Ecuador and Peru (the Shuara, Achuara, Aguaruna and Mayna people); they call it nijimanche. As Michael Harner describes it:

The sweet manioc beer (nihamanci or nijiamanchi), is prepared by first peeling and washing the tubers in the stream near the garden. Then the water and manioc are brought to the house, where the tubers are cut up and put in a pot to boil. ... The manioc is then mashed and stirred to a soft consistency with the aid of a special wooden paddle. While the woman stirs the mash, she chews handfuls [sic] of [it] and spits them back into the pot, a process that may take half an hour or longer.

After the mash has been prepared, it is transferred to a beer storage jar and left to ferment. ... The resultant liquid tastes somewhat like a pleasingly alcoholic buttermilk and is most refreshing. The Jivaros consider it to be far superior to plain water, which they drink only in emergencies.

The Tiriós and Erwarhoyanas, Indigenous tribes from northern Brazil and Suriname, make a beverage called sakurá with the sweet variety of cassava.

Yagua people brew a similar beverage which they called masato.

== See also ==
- List of saliva-fermented beverages
