= Sonti (rice drink) =

Rice-based alcoholic drink

Sonti is a rice-based alcoholic drink, originating from the Indian subcontinent, that is made much like sake and is similar to wine in its alcohol content and use. Sonti is made by steaming rice; to saccharify the starches to sugar, a mold, Rhizopus sonti (in sake, Aspergillus oryzae) is used, followed by fermentation.

== See also ==
- Rice wine
