= Tapiitawa =

Tapiitawa is a small Tapirapé Indian village in the municipality of Confresa, Mato Grosso, Brazil.

By 1953 it was the home of the last survivors of the Tapirapé people, which by then were reduced to 51 individuals. Thanks to the help of a group of missionary nuns (the Little Sisters of Jesus) and protective measures by the Brazilian government, the population began to recover, and was 136 in 1976. The town has a public school.
