= Gouqi jiu =

Any of several Chinese alcoholic beverages made with wolfberries

- Chinese: 枸杞酒
Transcriptions
Standard Mandarin
- Hanyu Pinyin: gǒuqǐ jiǔ

Gouqi jiu (Chinese: 枸杞酒; pinyin: gǒuqǐ jiǔ; lit. 'wolfberry wine') can refer to several varieties of Chinese alcoholic beverage containing goji.

== Variations ==
There are three distinct kinds of gouqi jiu: distilled, fermented, and those produced by steeping goji (wolfberries) in other types of alcoholic drink. There is also a beer made from wolfberries.

== History ==
Gouqi jiu has a long history in China. It was recorded in Han dynasty records.

== See also ==
- Baijiu
- Huangjiu
