= Pito (beer) =

Fermented alcoholic beverage

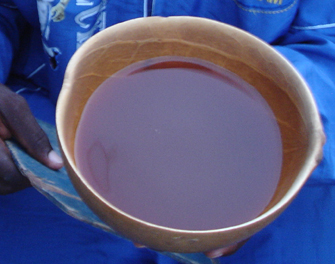
A container of warm pito

Pito is a type of beer made from fermented millet or sorghum in northern Ghana, parts of Nigeria, and other parts of West Africa. It is made by small (household-level) producers, and is typically served in a calabash outside the producer's home where benches are sometimes provided.

Pito can be served warm or cold. Warm pito gets its heat from the fermentation process. Pito brewing can provide an important source of income for otherwise cash-poor households in rural areas. It is never found bottled or canned, and, as a rule, is purchased directly from the household in which it is brewed.

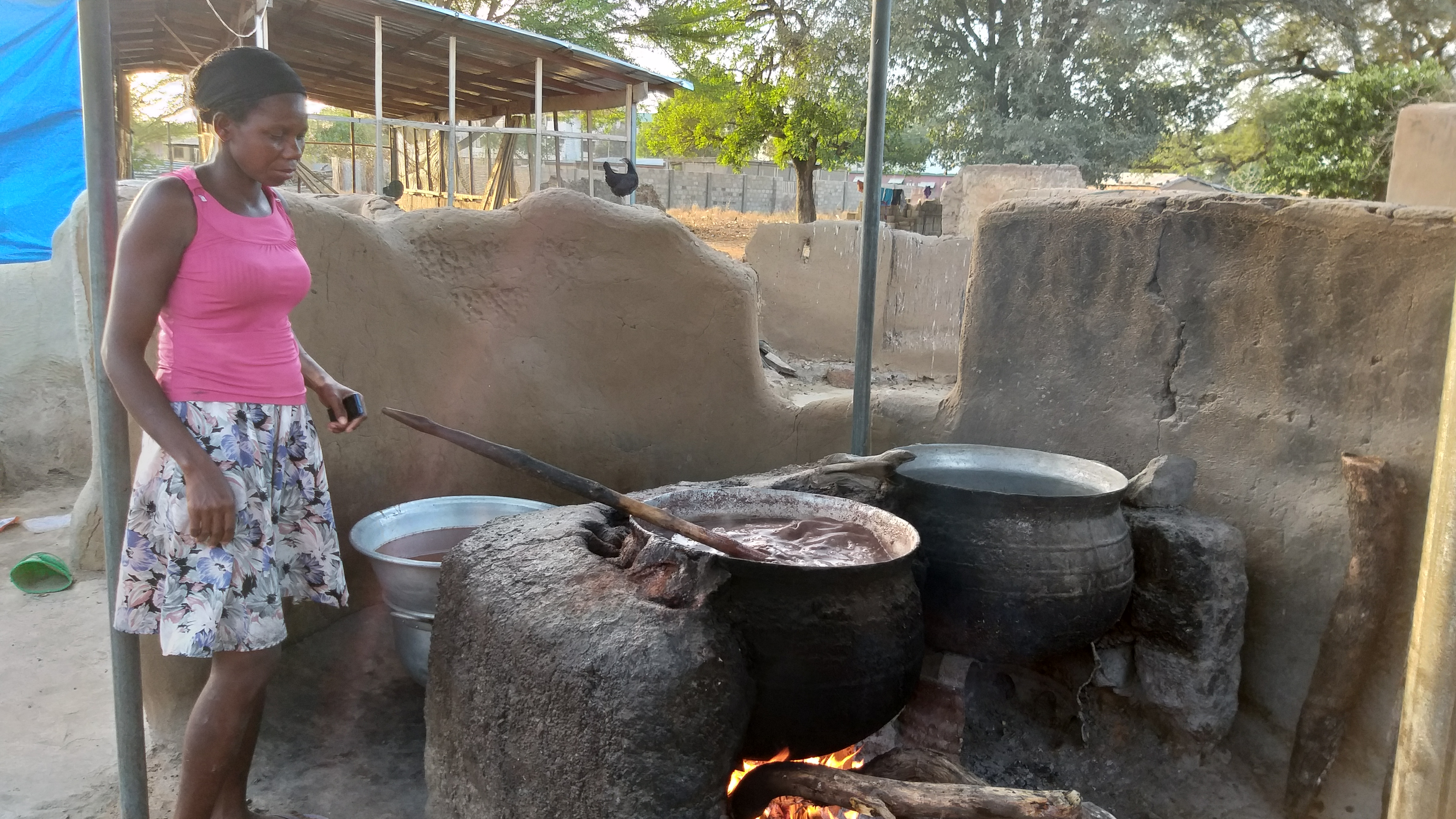
A woman stirring Pito in a traditional kitchen

== Ingredients ==
- millet or sorghum
- water

== Method of preparation ==
First, sorghum or millet is taken to the mill to be ground into powder, or this can be done in a blender. After the sorghum or millet is milled, the powder is mixed with water, stirred thoroughly and left to settle. Once settled, the water on top the mash is removed and the remaining mash is boiled. When the boiling is finished, the mixture is poured into a different container and left to ferment for 24 hours. Once the fermentation process is completed, the mixture is boiled once more and then strained to separate the solid substance from the liquid. The pito is then ready for consumption after the liquid cools down.

== See also ==
- Millet beer
