= Kwete =

Ugandan traditional beer made using sorghum, millet and malt

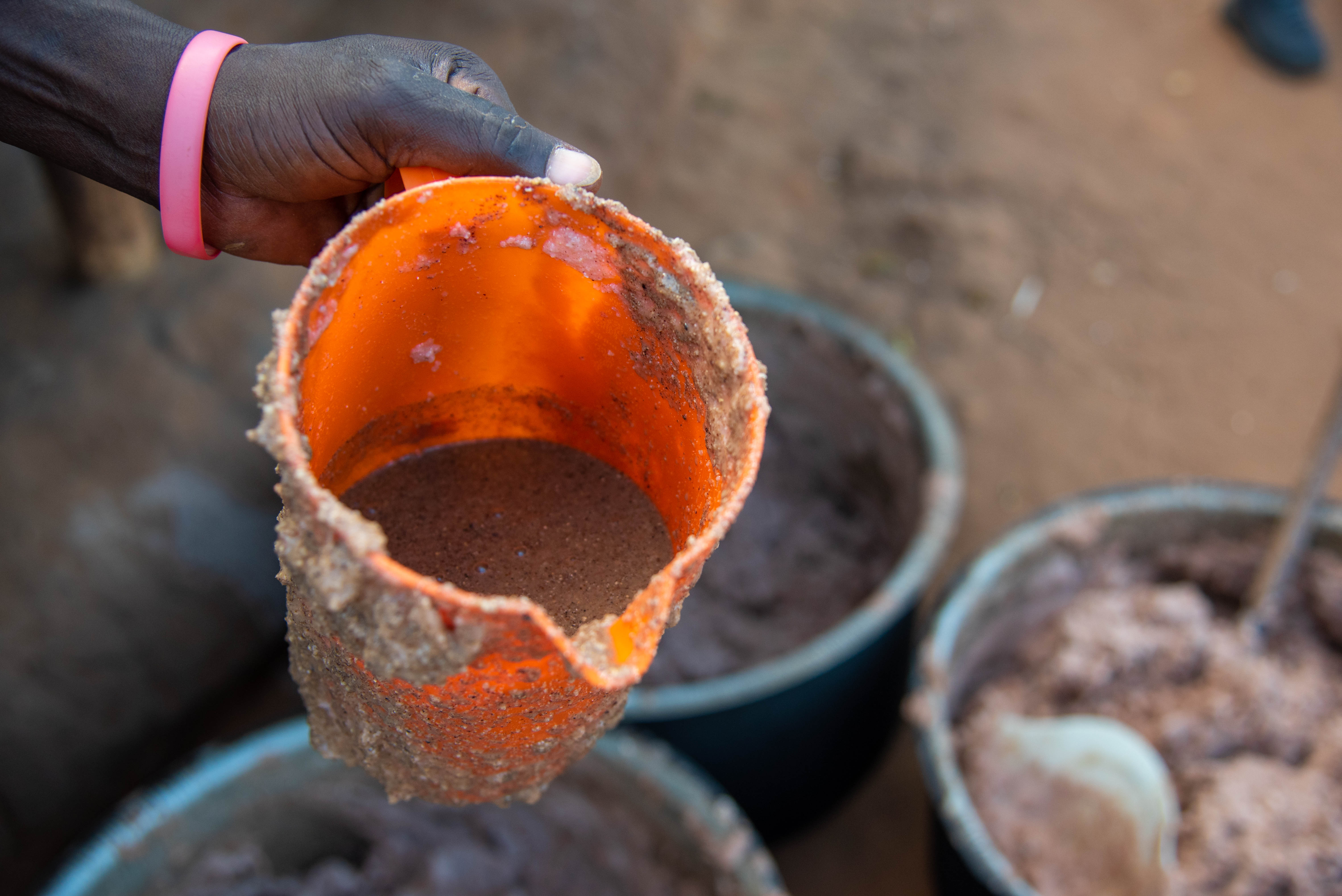
Kwete.

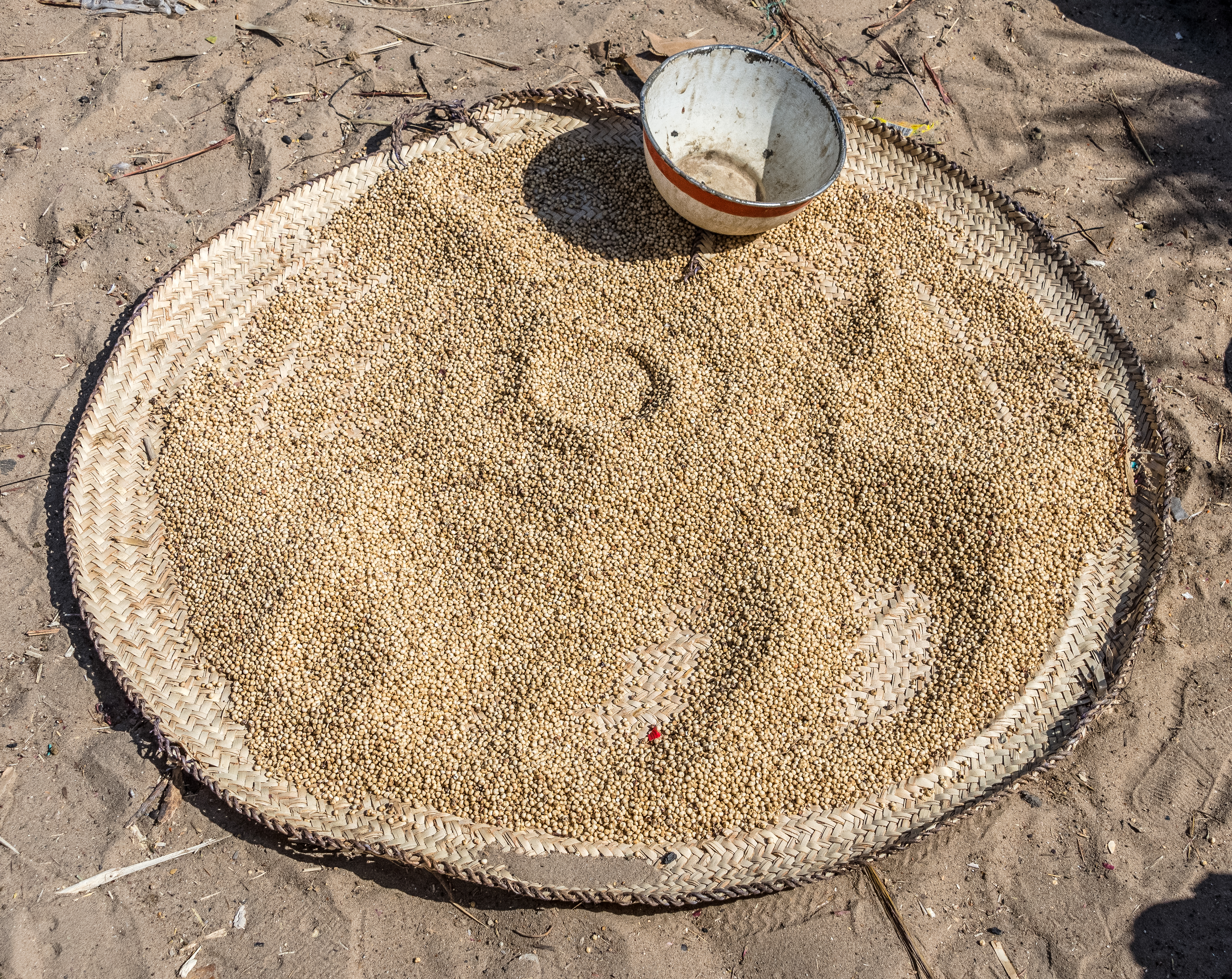
Millet an ingredient of Kwete

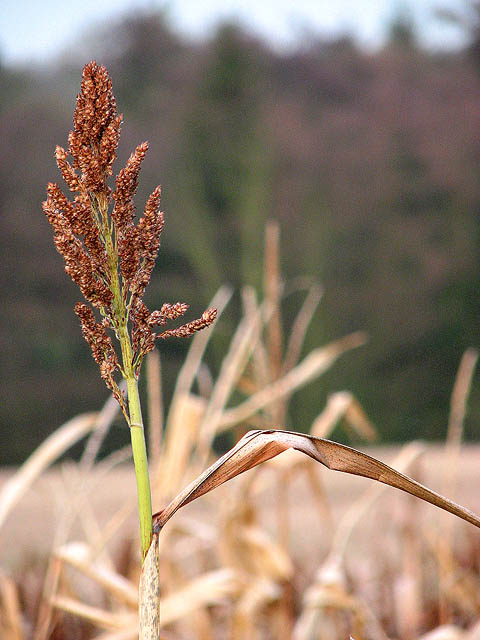
Sorghum plant which makes Kwete

Also known as Kpete, Kwete is the alcoholic beverage brewed particularly by the Lugbara people of Uganda, Abanyala ba Kakamega in Kenya and DR Congo. The production process involves mixing fermented sorghum, millet or maize, malt, boiled water and yeast which is locally called Aku fi.

In West Nile markets, this traditional beer is usually sold and consumed in a calabash (locally called Icereke) but can also be bought in any container.

== Other producers ==
Kwete is also produced in Kampala and the rest of Uganda. High-quality Kwete is cream to light brown in color and has a thick, consistent sweet-sour taste. Its production involves millet grains being soaked for 24 - 48 hours, followed by germination for 48–72 hours and sun dried for about 48 hours before souring in a container sealed at the top. Next, roasting of sourdough is done on a large rectangular metallic tray before mashing and fermentation. The final step involves filtering the mixture through a cloth to produce a smooth, uniformly colored drink.

The Pojulu people of South Sudan also sell an alcohol by the same name and so do the Bukusu tribe of Kenya.

== See also ==
- Lugbara cuisine
- Tonto (beverage)
- Enturire
