= Tonto (drink) =

Ugandan fermented beverage made from bananas

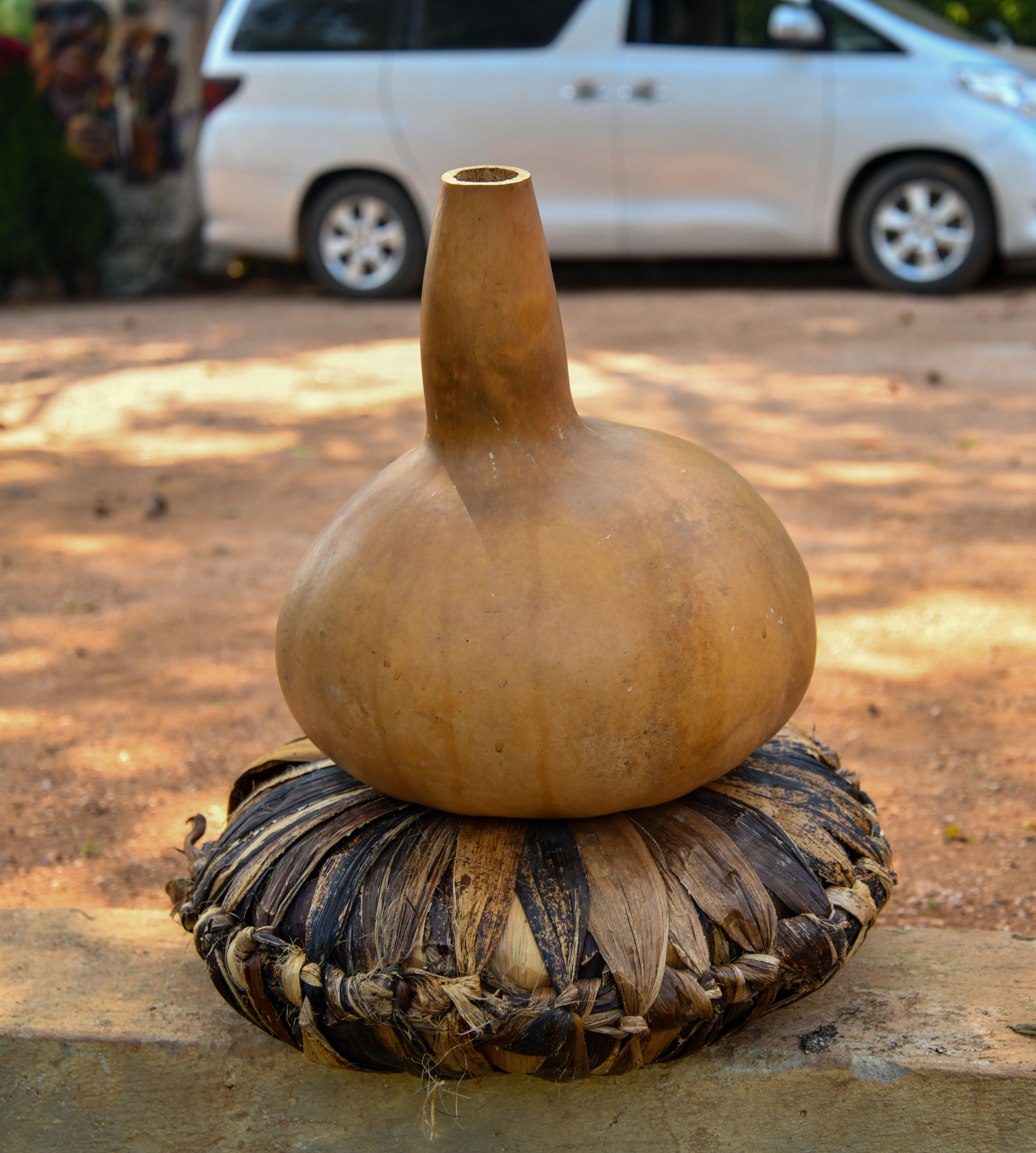
A big calabash (Ekita) used to carry local beer (tonto/mwengebigere)

Tonto (also known as Mwenge Bigere) is a traditional drink indigenous to Uganda primarily made from bananas. It is one of several banana-based alcoholic drinks in Ugandan culture, alongside others such as Waragi (a banana-based spirit) and banana wines. Tonto holds cultural significance and is widely consumed in the banana-growing regions of central and western Uganda.

== Production Process ==
The production of Tonto begins with the ripening of green bananas. The bananas are placed in a pit and left to ripen for several days . Once ripened, the bananas are peeled, and the juice is extracted. The juice is then filtered to remove any solid particles and diluted with water.

The next step involves mixing the banana juice with ground and roasted sorghum, which acts as a fermenting agent. This mixture is left to ferment for two to four days, depending on the desired strength and flavor. Tonto has an alcohol content ranging from six to eleven percent by volume, making it a mildly alcoholic beverage. The exact alcohol content can vary depending on the duration of fermentation and the specific ingredients used.

== Cultural and Economic Significance ==
The production and sales of Tonto provide a significant source of income for many families in these regions. Small-scale producers often sell the drink locally. The drink is particularly popular in the central and western regions of Uganda, where banana cultivation is a major agricultural activity.

== Read also ==
- Enturire
- Kwete
- Obwato
