= Millet beer =

African alcoholic beverage

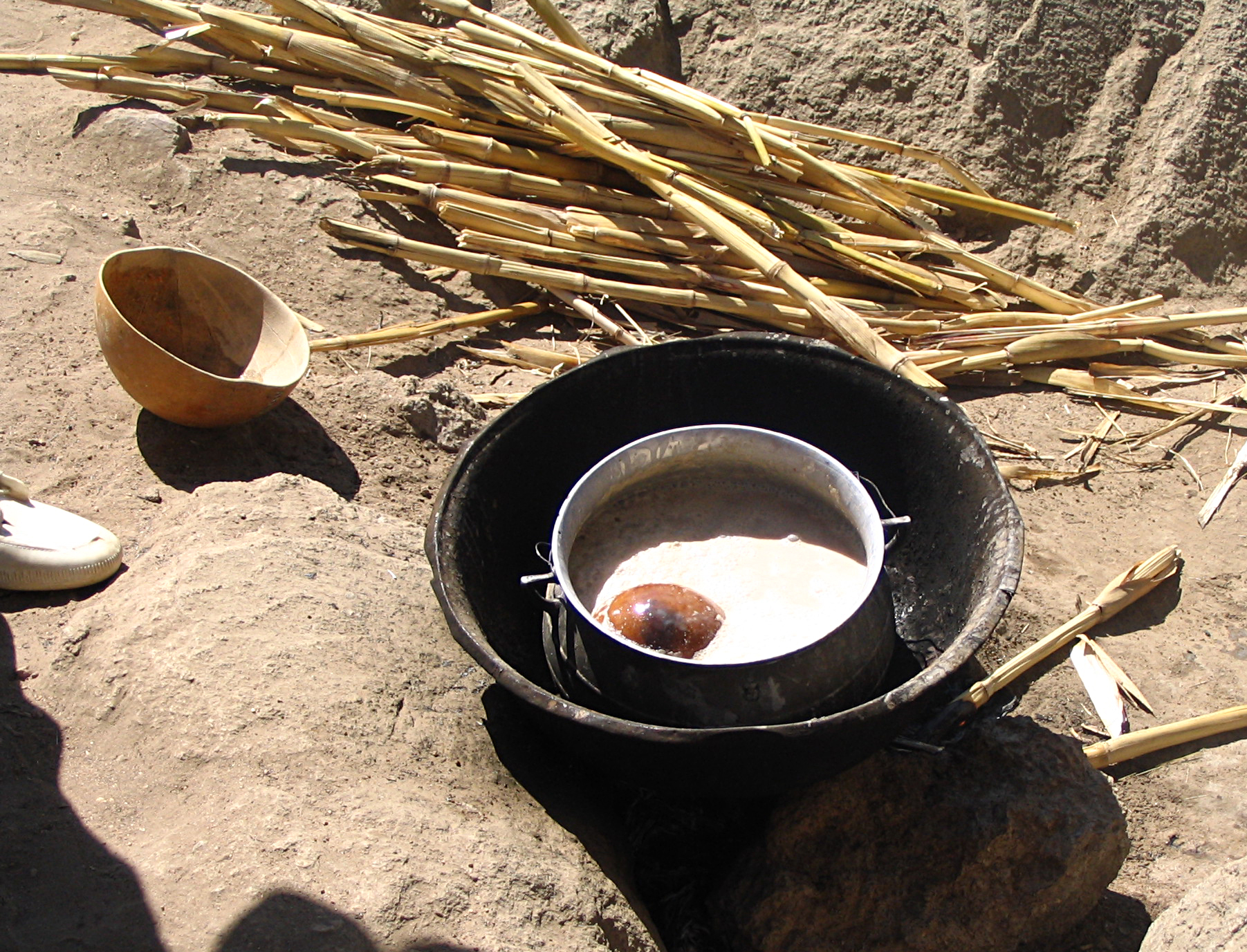
Millet beer in Rhumsiki, Far North Province, Cameroon

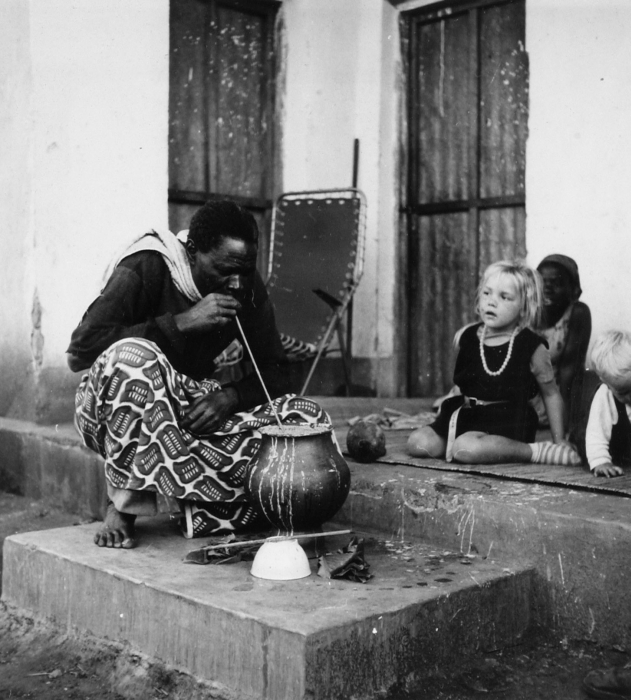
A man drinking pombe on the porch of Bonno Thoden van Velzen (Ibala village, 1967).

Millet beer, also known as Bantu beer, malwa, pombe "Tchouk" or opaque beer, is an alcoholic beverage made from malted millet that is common throughout Africa. Its production process varies across regions and in the southern parts of Africa is more commonly known as umqombothi. Millet beer varies in taste and alcoholic content between ethnic groups. It is served in calabash gourds.

== Production ==
This type of beer is common throughout Africa. Related African drinks include maize beer and sorghum beer.

In the Balkans and Turkey a form of millet beer named boza is produced.

In the U.S., Sprecher Brewery produces a type of beer that contains a mix of millet and sorghum known as Shakparo.

A form of millet beer is also produced by the Ainu.

== Production process ==
Millet kernels are soaked in warm water until they sprout, with the goal to increase the content of maltose in the grain. The millet is then dried out to arrest the germination process. The malted grain is then pulverized and mixed with water. This mixture is commonly known as wort. The wort is later boiled in order to remove any potential bacterial threat. Once the boiling process is complete and the wort cools down yeast is added. The mixture is then allowed to ferment. The entire process takes five days.

== Cultural significance ==
In many cultures of West Africa, millet beer is involved in every aspect of daily life, such as:

- Sacrifices;
- Rites of passage;
- Dances;
- Births, marriages, burials, and funeral celebrations;
- Welcoming a guest;
- Sealing a contract;
- Agricultural cooperatives;
- Thatching a roof;
- Pounding a courtyard;
- Domestic construction projects (barn raising);
- Discussions between village elders;
- Social gatherings at home and the market.

In some West African cultures, village women open their homes as 'pubs' one day a week, to sell millet beer. This gathering point provides social cohesion in the village. The millet beer is served in a calabash. Drinkers hold the calabash with the right hand, pouring a few drops on the ground in honor of ancestors before drinking. After drinking, drinkers pour the dregs on the ground in a straight line.

== Linguistics ==
- Ajon - Ateso (Uganda)
- Malwa - Luganda (Uganda)
- BilBil - Guiziga (Cameroon)
- Pombe - Kiswahili (Kenya)
- Tchouk ("chook") (Togo)
- Chibuku (Southern and Central Africa)
- Dolo - Dyula (West Africa, Burkina Faso)
- Capalo - Senufo (West Africa, Burkina Faso)
- Mbege or wari o mbeke - Chagga (Tanzania)
- Mariisa - Sudanese Arabic (Sudan)

== See also ==
- Pito (beer)
- Tella
- Ikupasuy
- Millet wine
