= Poire Williams =

Type of fruit brandy made from pear

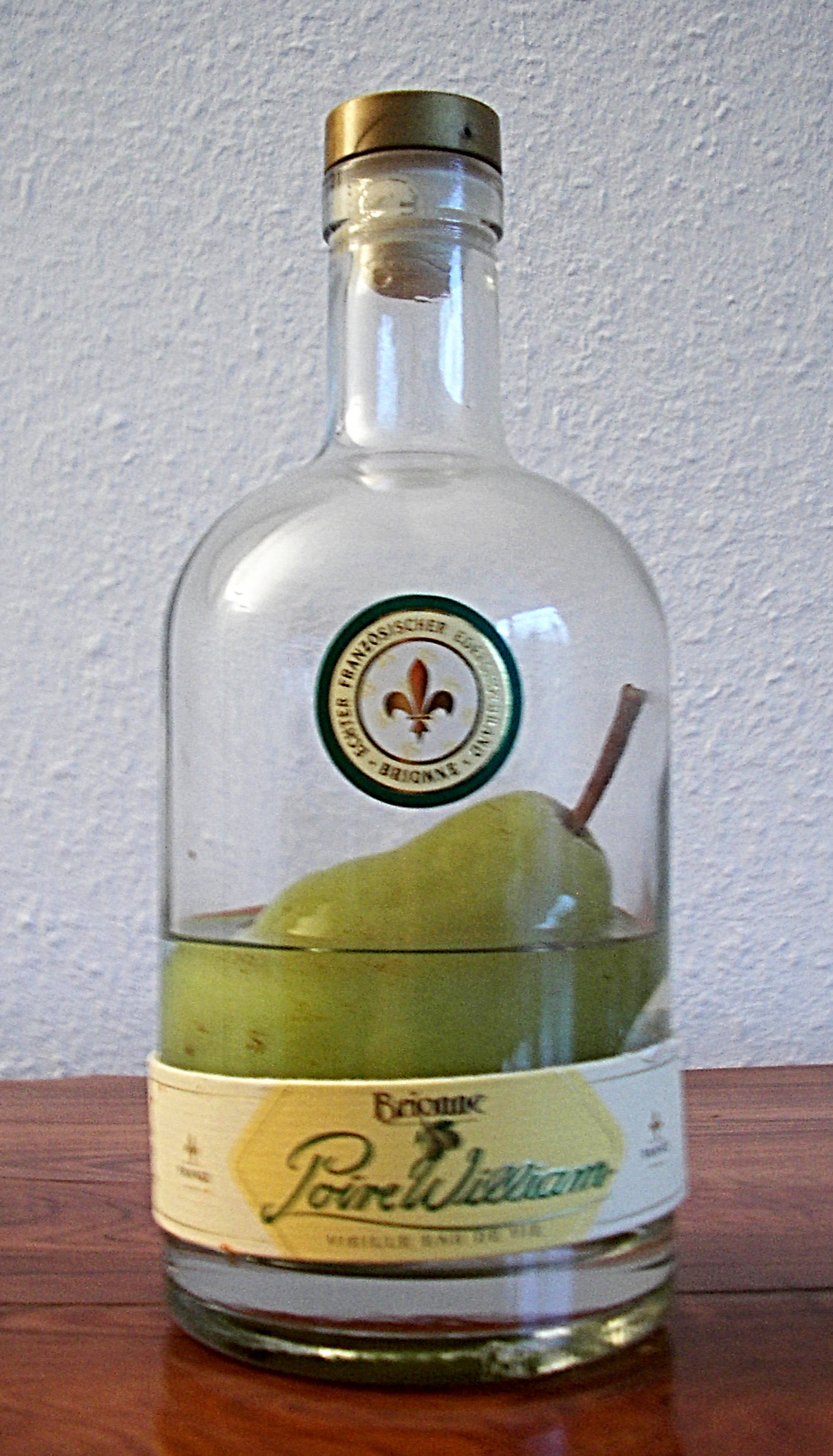
A prisonnière Poire Williams

Poire Williams is the name for eau de vie (colorless, unsweetened fruit brandy) made from the Williams pear (also known as Williams' bon chrétien and as the Bartlett pear in the United States, Canada and Australia) in France and Switzerland. It is generally served chilled as an after-dinner drink. Some producers of Poire Williams include an entire pear inside each bottle, called prisonnière. This is achieved by attaching the bottle to a budding pear tree so that the pear will grow inside it. In Switzerland, a regional form known as Eau-de-vie de poire du Valais has been protected since 2001 as an Appellation d’origine protégée (AOP), designating spirits produced in the Canton of Valais from Williams pears.

== History ==
Poire Williams is an eau-de-vie (fruit brandy) distilled from fermented Williams pears. The Williams pear is said to have originally developed in England in the late 18th century, before becoming widely cultivated in continental Europe during the 19th century. Production of the spirit is particularly associated with regions of France, Switzerland, and Germany.

According to the Swiss registration summary for the Valais appellation, the Williams pear was introduced into the canton in the early 20th century. In 1945, distillers in Valais began producing an Eau-de-vie made exclusively from Williams pears, which later became associated with the regional speciality.

== Production ==
Poire Williams is produced by fermenting and distilling the juice or mash of Williams pears to create a clear fruit brandy. The fruits is allowed to ripen fully before fermentation in order to develop sugar content and aroma. After fermentation, the mash is distilled to produce a clear spirit that preserves the aromatic character of the pear. In the case of the protected Valais designation, the official specification requires the spirit to be produced exclusively from Williams pears, with the cultivation of fruit, fermentation, distillation, and bottling to take place within the Canton of Valais. The specifications set a minimum alcoholic strength of 40% vol., and require a minimum resting period of three months in tanks before bottling.

== Valais appellation ==
Since 2001, Eau-de-vie de poire du Valais has been protected as an Appellation d'origine protégée (AOP). The legal designation applies only to the complete name Eau-de-vie de poire du Valais; the generic term eau-de-vie de poire is not protected.

Certification under the AOP is carried out by designated certification bodies (including the Organisme Intercantonal de Certification and Procert Safety AG), and numbered control labels are reserved for eau-de-vie sold under the AOP. The AOP specification defines the geographical production area as the Canton of Valais, Switzerland and restricts the raw material to the Williams pear variety. The official specification has been amended several times since its production, including revisions adopted in 2014 and 2020.

== Pear-in-a-bottle practice ==
Some producers of Poire Williams bottle the spirit with a whole pear inside. The technique involves attaching empty bottles to pear trees in spring so that developing fruit grows inside the bottle. When the pear ripens inside the bottle, it is removed from the tree, cleaned and filled with pear brandy. The AOP specification for Eau-de-vie de poire de Valais permits the inclusion of a Williams pear inside the bottle as part of this traditional presentation.
