= Masato (drink) =

Beverage from prehispanic Latin America

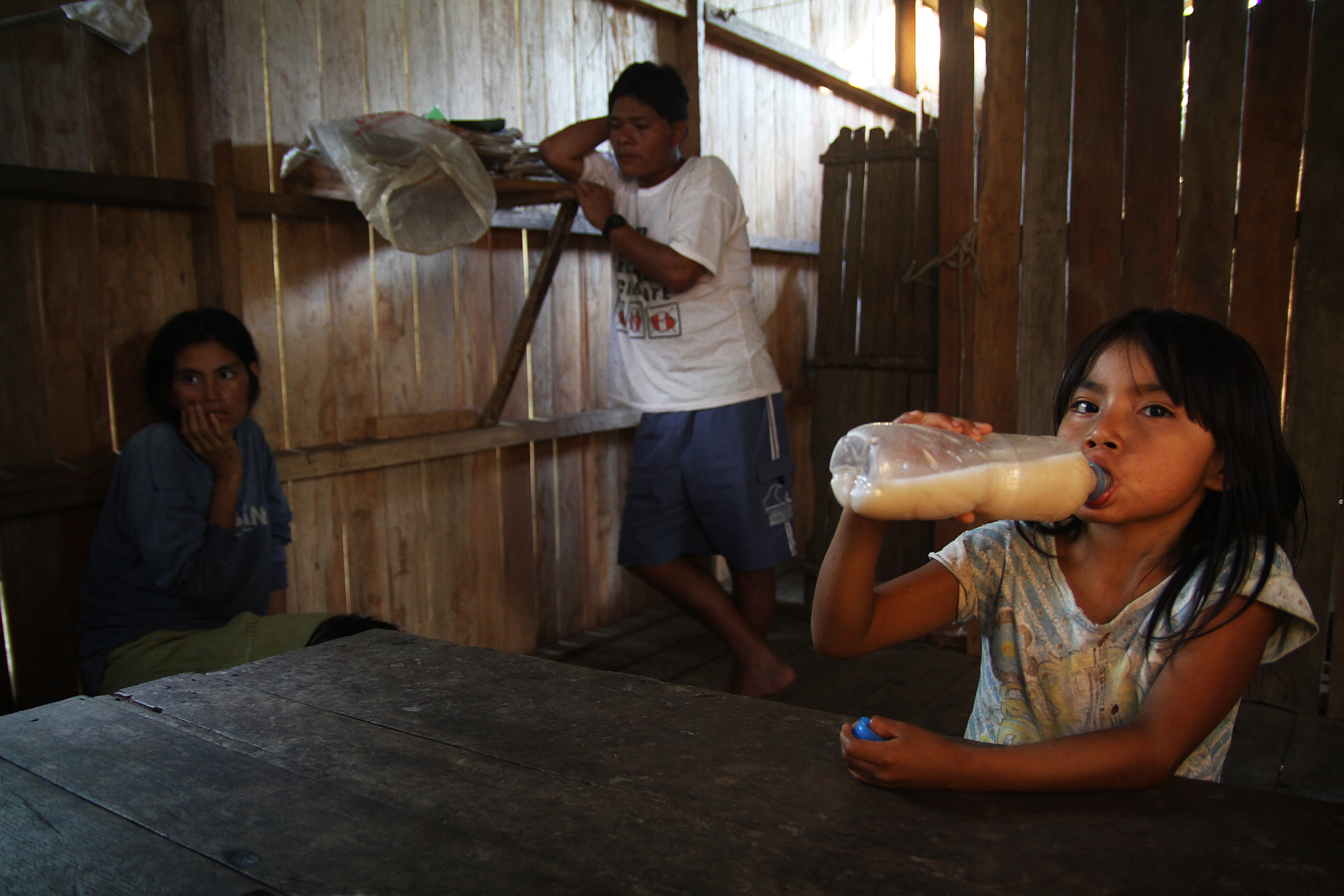
- Girl drinking masato
- Type: Beverage
- Origin: Colombia, Peru, Venezuela and Brazil

Masato is a beverage made from cassava, rice, corn, oats, or pineapple. Its preparation involves fermenting these ingredients in a pot with water for approximately 8 days, until the mixture begins to foam. Like other alcoholic beverages, it is produced through microbial fermentation, especially by various types of Lactobacillus.

== Regional Varieties ==
=== Colombia ===
Masato is a widely consumed indigenous beverage in the departments of Cundinamarca, Santander, Tolima, Norte de Santander, and Boyacá in Colombia. The recipe has been passed down through the tradition of grandparents, and its production has spread to other regions within the country, including the Northern Coast.

It is a fermented drink made from corn, usually sweetened with molasses. The variety most consumed in the Altiplano Cundiboyacense highlands is prepared with rice and panela, often adding cloves and cinnamon. Other variations use wheat flour, and there are also preparations with arrowroot flour, rice, pumpkin, cassava, sorghum, and plantain. In recent years, industrial production has expanded. The fermentation process can be bootstrapped with pineapple rind, "guarapo", or beer.

Masato is often used to accompany various snacks, such as pastries, butter cookies, almojábanas, garullas, pandeyuca, or, in some cases, meat or chicken empanadas. Its consumption increases at the end of the year, as it is served with snacks typical of that season, such as buñuelos, natilla, and tamales.

=== Peru ===
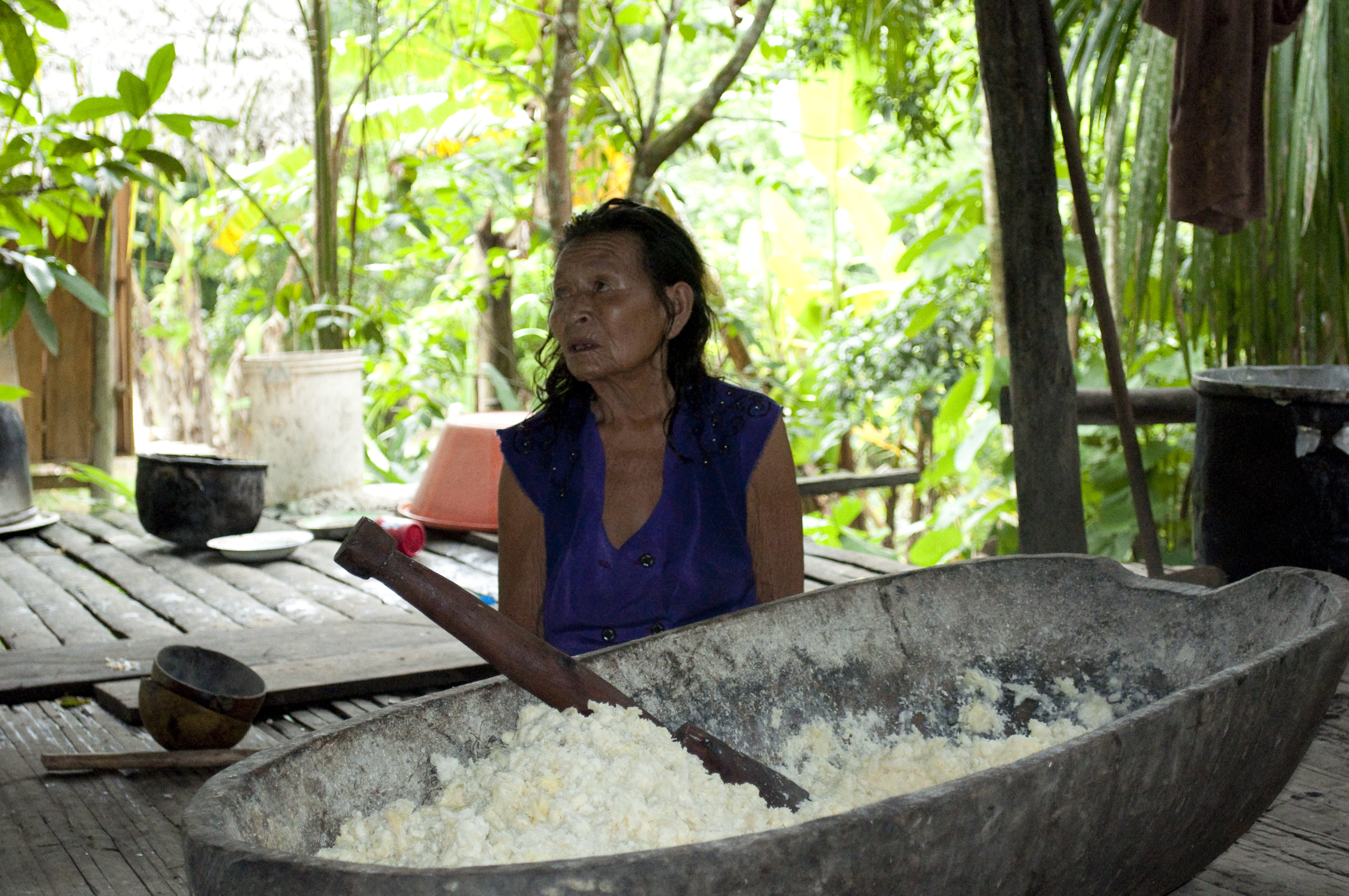
Native woman preparing masato de yuca

Masato in Peru is a fermented beverage traditionally made with boiled cassava and is known as masato de yuca. It has been made for at least a thousand years in the Amazon region. The cassava is mixed with water, chewed in the mouth, spat out, and left to rest so that the cassava starch converts into sugar and eventually ferments into alcohol. This method is prevalent among native Amazonian ethnicities. However, commercially, it is prepared by grinding cassava and adding bread yeast for fermentation, making it more accessible to those outside Amazonian ethnicities who might not want to drink it due to the unconventional chewing of cassava. Along with chicha de jora, it is one of the ancient beverages deeply rooted in Amazonian traditions.

Probiotic bacteria may potentially be isolated from masato de yuca.

=== Venezuela ===
Masato in Venezuela is made from rice, panela, and spices. It is typically consumed before fermentation, although some believe it is better when fermented as it becomes effervescent. It should be refrigerated to prevent it from becoming too strong. In the state of Táchira, it is common to blend the cooked rice with a syrup made from a geranium branch, giving it its characteristic flavor. Instead of panela, refined sugar is used to keep the drink white. Indigenous communities in the Amazonas state consume yuca chicha.

== See also ==
- Chicha
