= Kasiri =

Alcoholic beverage

Kasiri, also known as kaschiri and cassava beer, is an alcoholic drink made from cassava by Amerindians in Venezuela, Suriname and Guyana.

The roots of the cassava plant are grated, diluted in water, and pressed in a cylindrical basketwork press to extract the juice. The extracted juice is fermented to produce kasiri. In Brazil and Suriname the cassava roots are chewed and expectorated, a process where the amylase enzyme in saliva turns the starch into sugars and start fermentation.

The juice can also be boiled until it becomes a dark viscous syrup called kasripo (cassareep). This syrup has antiseptic properties and is used for flavoring.

== See also ==
- List of amylase-induced fermentations
