= 1705 =

1705 in various calendars
- Gregorian calendar: 1705; MDCCV
- Ab urbe condita: 2458
- Armenian calendar: 1154; ԹՎ ՌՃԾԴ
- Assyrian calendar: 6455
- Balinese saka calendar: 1626–1627
- Bengali calendar: 1111–1112
- Berber calendar: 2655
- English Regnal year: 3 Ann. 1 – 4 Ann. 1
- Buddhist calendar: 2249
- Burmese calendar: 1067
- Byzantine calendar: 7213–7214
- Chinese calendar: 甲申年 (Wood Monkey); 4402 or 4195 — to — 乙酉年 (Wood Rooster); 4403 or 4196
- Coptic calendar: 1421–1422
- Discordian calendar: 2871
- Ethiopian calendar: 1697–1698
- Hebrew calendar: 5465–5466
- Hindu calendars
- Vikram Samvat: 1761–1762
- Shaka Samvat: 1626–1627
- Kali Yuga: 4805–4806
- Holocene calendar: 11705
- Igbo calendar: 705–706
- Iranian calendar: 1083–1084
- Islamic calendar: 1116–1117
- Japanese calendar: Hōei 2 (宝永２年)
- Javanese calendar: 1628–1629
- Julian calendar: Gregorian minus 11 days
- Korean calendar: 4038
- Minguo calendar: 207 before ROC 民前207年
- Nanakshahi calendar: 237
- Thai solar calendar: 2247–2248
- Tibetan calendar: ཤིང་ཕོ་སྤྲེ་ལོ་ (male Wood-Monkey); 1831 or 1450 or 678 — to — ཤིང་མོ་བྱ་ལོ་ (female Wood-Bird); 1832 or 1451 or 679

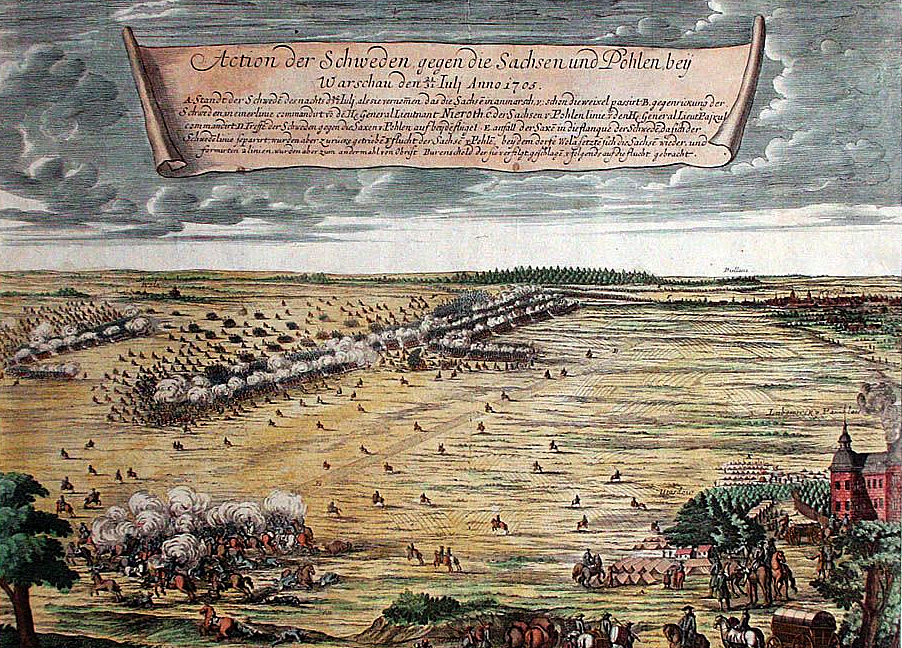
July 31: The Battle of Warsaw between rival factions for control of Poland.

1705 (MDCCV) was a common year starting on Thursday of the Gregorian calendar and a common year starting on Monday of the Julian calendar, the 1705th year of the Common Era (CE) and Anno Domini (AD) designations, the 705th year of the 2nd millennium, the 5th year of the 18th century, and the 6th year of the 1700s decade. As of the start of 1705, the Gregorian calendar was 11 days ahead of the Julian calendar, which remained in localized use until 1923.

In the Swedish calendar it was a common year starting on Sunday, one day ahead of the Julian and ten days behind the Gregorian calendar.

== Events ==
=== January–March ===
- January 8 – George Frideric Handel's first opera, Almira, is premiered in Hamburg.
- January 31 – The Hester, a British 28-gun sailing ship with a crew of 70, is lost in Persia.
- February 7 – Twelfth siege of Gibraltar: Marshal René de Froulay de Tessé of the French Army supplements the Spanish forces of the Marquis of Villadarias and seizes control of a strategic fortress, the Round Tower, but the forces retreat after a counterattack kills 200 of their number in the retaking of the Tower.
- February 25 – George Frideric Handel's opera Nero premieres in Hamburg.
- February 26 – Twelfth siege of Gibraltar: A French Navy fleet of 18 warships, commanded by Admiral Desjean, the Baron de Pointis arrives in the Bay of Gibraltar to aid the French and Spanish attempt to retake Gibraltar from England.
- March 8 – The Province of Carolina incorporates the town of Bath, making it the first incorporated town in modern-day North Carolina. The town becomes the political center and de facto capital of the northern portion of the Province of Carolina until Edenton is incorporated in 1722.
- March 14 – Queen Anne gives royal assent to the Parliament of England's Alien Act 1705, setting a deadline of December 25, 1705, for Scotland's parliament to authorize negotiations for a Treaty of Union with England to create the Kingdom of Great Britain and threatening that unless Scotland agrees to negotiate terms for union and accepts the Hanoverian succession by December 25, there would be a ban on the import of all Scottish staple products into England and Scots would also lose the privileges of Englishmen under English law – thus endangering rights to any property they held in England.
- March 31 (March 20 O.S.) – The Twelfth siege of Gibraltar ends as a fleet of warships from the navies of England, Portugal and the Netherlands, commanded by English Admiral John Leake, arrives at the Bay of Gibraltar with 35 warships and English and Portuguese troops. In the battle that follows, five of the French Navy's ships are sunk and Admiral Desjean is seriously wounded, forcing the French and Spanish to retreat.

=== April–June ===
- April 5 – Anne, Queen of England dissolves the English House of Commons that had been elected in 1702, and orders new elections.
- April 9 – The Queen's Theatre is opened in London by John Vanbrugh and William Congreve, serving as an opera house, premiering with Gli amori di ergasto ("The Loves of Ergasto"), an Italian language opera by German composer Jakob "Giacomo" Greber. A theatre remains in operation on this site for more than 300 years, becoming Her Majesty's Theatre.
- April 16 – Queen Anne of England honours Isaac Newton with the title of Knight Bachelor at Trinity College, Cambridge.
- May 5 – Joseph I succeeds his father Leopold I as Holy Roman Emperor.
- May 7 – 1705 English general election: Voting begins for 110 constituencies of the 513-member House of Commons of England (including Wales)
- June 6 – Voting ends in the English general election, with the Tories retaining their majority in the House of Commons but losing 38 seats, while the Whigs gain 49 seats. The balance in the 513 seats is 260 for the Tories, 233 for the Whigs, 20 for other candidates.
- June 20 – The Pact of Genoa is signed by representatives of England and the Spanish Principality of Catalonia as a military alliance providing for English troops to be stationed in Catalonia as part of the War of Spanish Succession.

=== July–September ===
- July 11 – José de Grimaldo, the Marquis of Grimaldo, becomes the head of government of Spain after being appointed by King Philip V as the Secretary of the Universal Bureau.
- July 14 – The newly-elected 2nd Parliament of Queen Anne in England, last to serve before the union with Scotland that produces Great Britain, is opened by the Queen.
- July 15 – Al-Husayn I ibn Ali becomes the first Bey of Tunis, founding the Husainid dynasty that rules Tunisia until the abolition of the monarchy in 1957.
- July 18 – War of the Spanish Succession: The Battle of Elixheim is fought near the city of Tienen (in modern-day Belgium). A troop of soldiers under the command of England's Duke of Marlborough kills 3,000 French troops under the command of the Duc de Valleroy and forces the retreat of the others, breaking the "Lines of Brabant". Because his soldiers have marched all night and then fought the battle over a full day, Marlborough is unable to send them in pursuit of Villeroy's troops.
- July 20 – The planet Mercury transits Jupiter, as seen by astronomers from Earth. The event happens again on October 4, 1708, but will not be seen again from Earth until October 27, 2088
- July 26 – Great Northern War: At the Battle of Gemauerthof, fought in modern-day Latvia, Swedish forces under the command of General Adam Ludwig Lewenhaupt overwhelm a much larger force of Russian troops commanded by Count Boris Sheremetev, killing 2,000 Russians and wounding as many as 3,000.
- July 31 – The Battle of Warsaw is fought near Warsaw, Poland, in the Great Northern War.
- August 16–18 – In an Atlantic tropical cyclone across Cuba and Florida, four ships are lost and there are many casualties.
- August 31–September 5 – War of the Spanish Succession: The Siege of Zoutleeuw is carried out by the alliance of Dutch, English, Scottish and Holy Roman Empire troops against the French-held fortress of Zoutleeuw (in modern-day Belgium).
- September 17 – First Javanese War of Succession: On the island of Java in the Dutch East Indies (modern-day Indonesia), Pakubuwono I becomes the new Sultan of Martaram, capturing Kartosuro and deposing Sultan Amangkurat III.
- September 20 – Francis II Rákóczi is proclaimed as the ruler of Hungary by independence activists in Szécsény who are opposed to the rule of the Habsburg successor to Leopold I, the Holy Roman emperor Joseph I.
- September 24 (O.S.) – Stanisław Leszczyński is crowned as King of Poland.

=== October–December ===
- c. October 3 – 31 people are killed in a colliery explosion at the Stony Flatt pit in Gateshead on Tyneside in England.
- October 4 (N.S.) – Stanisław Leszczyński is crowned Stanisław I of Poland.
- November – In Williamsburg, capital of the Colony of Virginia in America, construction of the Capitol Building is completed.
- November 5 – The Dublin Gazette in Ireland publishes its first edition.
- November 15 – Battle of Zsibó: The Austrian-Danish forces defeat the Kurucs (Hungarians).
- November 16 – An annular solar eclipse is visible in the southern Atlantic Ocean.
- November 23 – The premiere of the play Ulysses by Nicholas Rowe takes place in London, starring Thomas Betterton.
- November 24 – An earthquake is recorded in Syria, northeast of Damascus.
- November 28 – The Treaty of Warsaw is concluded between the Swedish Empire and the faction of the Polish–Lithuanian Commonwealth loyal to Stanisław Leszczyński during the Great Northern War.
- December 13 – In the Battle of Saint Gotthard, the Hungarian army is victorious.
- December 21 – The Sophia Naturalization Act is passed by the Parliament of England, which naturalizes Sophia of Hanover (next in succession to the British throne) and the Protestant "issue of her body" as British subjects.
- December 25 – In Munich, capital of Bavaria, 1,100 militiamen from the Oberland are killed during the Sendlinger Mordweihnacht after a failed attempt to break through several gates and capture a depot to seize better weaponry; many men are slaughtered by German federal infantry and Hungarian Hussars, despite their capitulation to Austrian officers.
- December 26 – Fateh Singh and Zorawar Singh, sons of Guru Gobind Singh, are murdered by Wazir Khan for refusing to convert to Islam, and become hallowed martyrs in Sikhism.
- December 29 – The premiere of the play Idoménée by Prosper Jolyot de Crébillon takes place in Paris.

=== Date unknown ===
- Construction begins on Blenheim Palace in Oxfordshire designed by John Vanbrugh for the Duke of Marlborough and partly funded by the Crown. It is completed in 1724.
- Taichung City, Taiwan is founded as the village of Dadun.
- Edmond Halley publicly predicts the periodicity of Halley's Comet and computes its expected path of return in 1758.
- With the interest paid from daimyō loans, the Konoike buy a tract of ponds and swampland, turn the land into rice paddies, and settle 480 households numbering perhaps 2,880 peasants on the land.
- The Shogunate confiscates the property of a merchant in Osaka "for conduct unbecoming a member of the commercial class". The government seizes 50 pairs of gold screens, 360 carpets, several mansions, 48 granaries and warehouses scattered around the country, and hundreds of thousands of gold pieces.

== Births ==
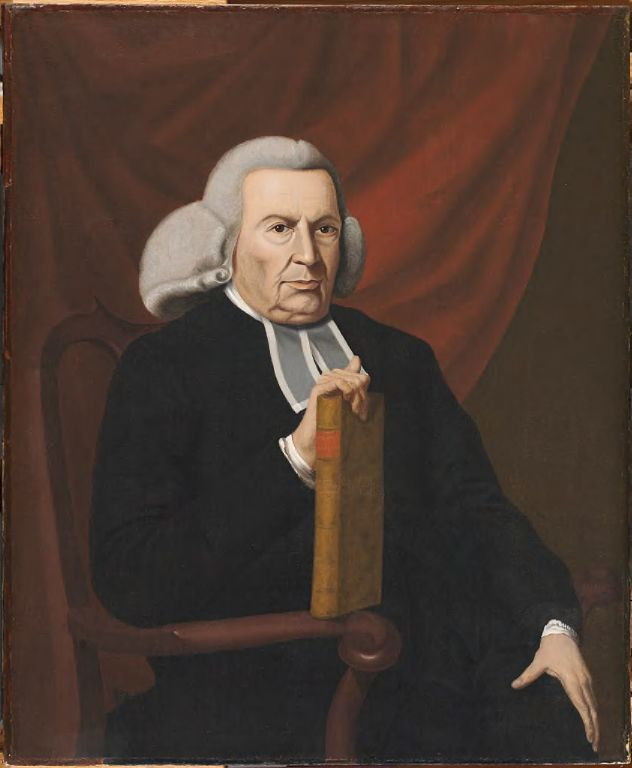
Charles Chauncy (1705–1787) born 1 January

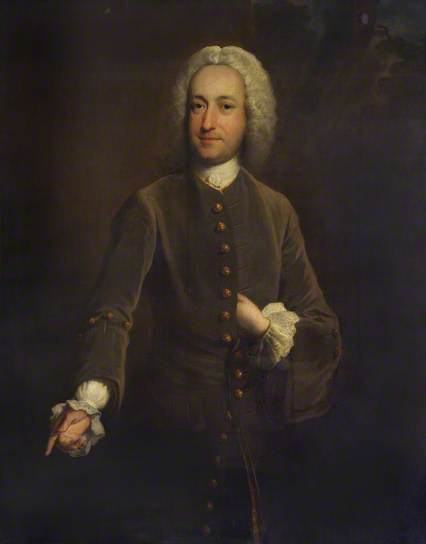
Isaac Hawkins Browne (poet) born 21 January

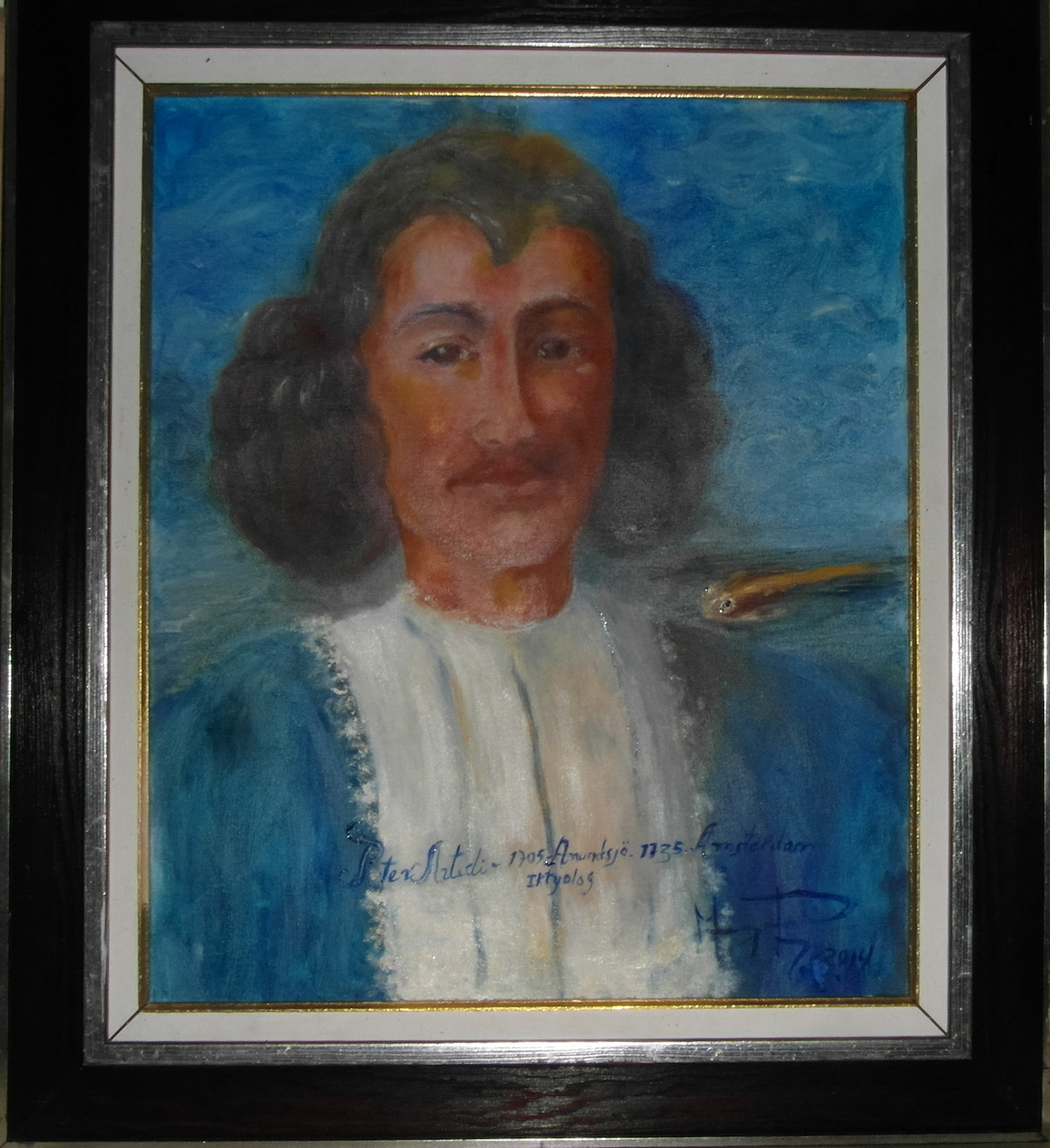
Peter Artedi born 27 February

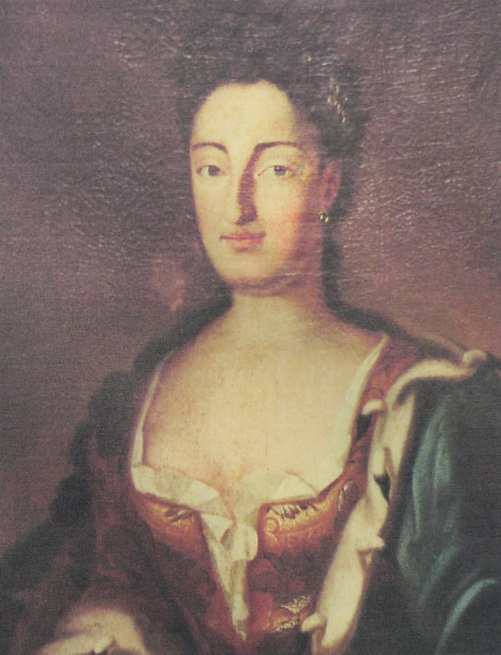
Sophie Caroline of Brandenburg-Kulmbach born 31 March

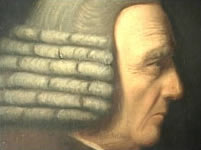
William Cookworthy born 12 April

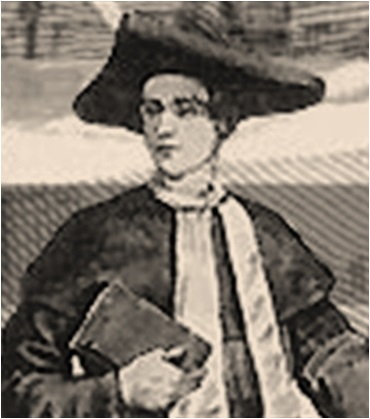
António José da Silva born 8 May

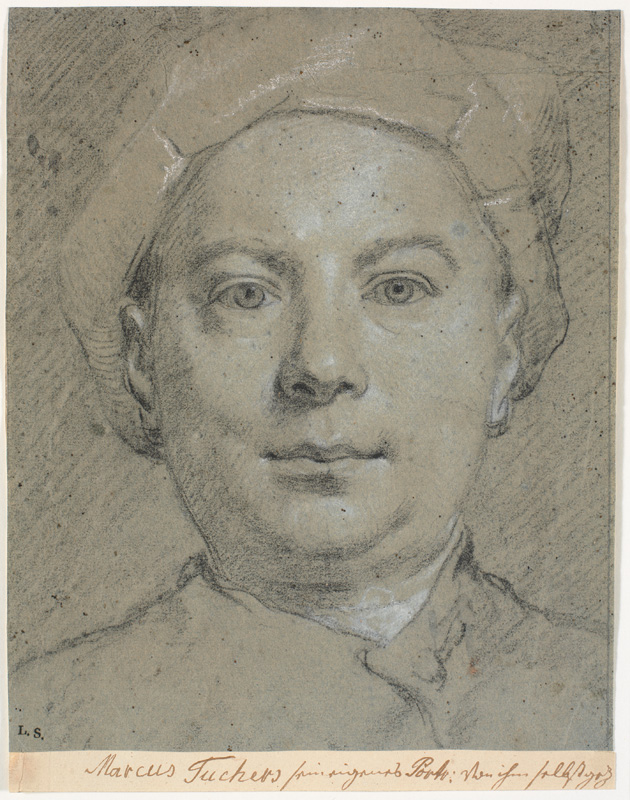
Carl Marcus Tuscher born 1 June

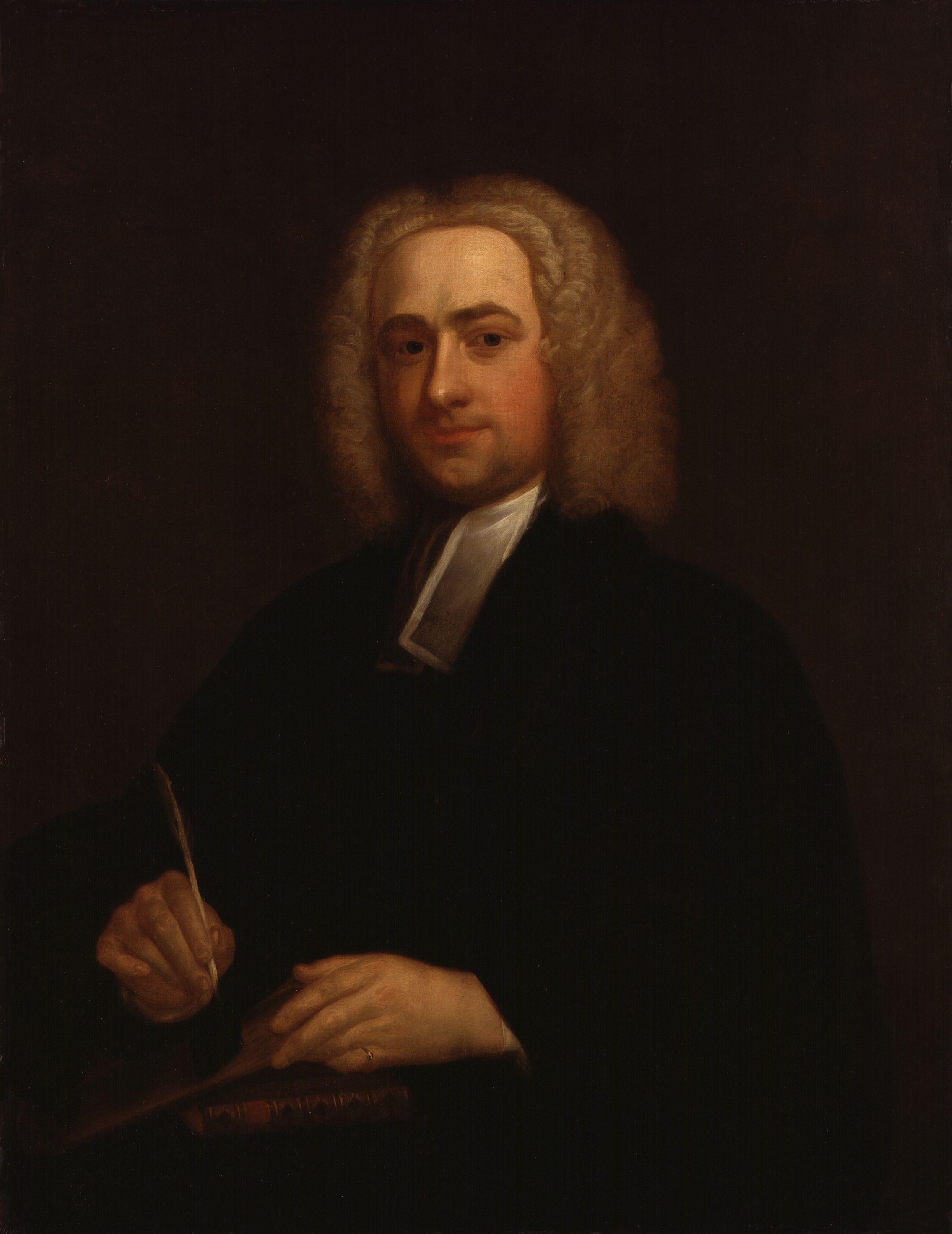
Thomas Birch born 23 November

=== January–March ===
- January 1 – Charles Chauncy, American Congregational clergyman (d. 1787)
- January 5 – John Stanhope, English Member of Parliament (d. 1748)
- January 8 – Jacques-François Blondel, French architect and teacher (d. 1774)
- January 14 – Jean-Baptiste Charles Bouvet de Lozier, French governor of the Mascarene Islands (d. 1786)
- January 15 – Ludwig Gruno of Hesse-Homburg (d. 1745)
- January 21 – Isaac Hawkins Browne, English poet (d. 1760)
- January 24 – Farinelli, Italian castrato (d. 1782)
- January 28 – Reverend Joseph Fish, pastor in the British North American colonies (d. 1781)
- February 3 – John Robinson, politician, landowner in the British colony of Virginia (d. 1766)
- February 13 – Franciszka Urszula Radziwiłłowa, Polish writer and playwright (d. 1753)
- February 15 – Charles-André van Loo, French painter (d. 1765)
- February 20 – Nicolas Chédeville, French composer (d. 1782)
- February 21 – Edward Hawke, 1st Baron Hawke, British Royal Navy admiral (d. 1781)
- February 24 – Hieronymus David Gaubius, German physician and chemist (d. 1780)
- February 25 – Edward Ironside, British banker, Lord Mayor of London in 1753 (d. 1753)
- February 27 – Peter Artedi, Swedish naturalist, known as the "father of ichthyology" (d. 1735)
- March 2 – William Murray, 1st Earl of Mansfield, Scottish judge and politician (d. 1793)
- March 8 – Margrethe Marie Thomasine Numsen, Danish courtier (d. 1776)
- March 9 – Tommaso Temanza, Italian architect and author of the Neoclassic period (d. 1789)
- March 12 – Noël Jourda de Vaux, French noble and general (d. 1788)
- March 18 – Jeremias Van Rensselaer, 6th patroon of Rensselaerwyck, eldest son of Kiliaen van Rensselaer and Maria van Cortlandt (d. 1743)
- March 20 – Johann Sigismund Scholze, Silesian music anthologist and poet (d. 1750)
- March 21 – Lorenz Natter, German gem-engraver and medallist (d. 1763)
- March 22 – Nicolas-Sébastien Adam, French sculptor (d. 1778)
- March 30 – August Johann Rösel von Rosenhof, German miniature painter (d. 1759)
- March 31 – Sophie Caroline of Brandenburg-Kulmbach, princess consort of Ostfriesland as the spouse of Prince George Albert (d. 1764)

=== April–June ===
- April 7 – Sir Edward O'Brien, 2nd Baronet (d. 1765)
- April 9 – Nathan Webb (d. 1772)
- April 12 – William Cookworthy, English Quaker minister (d. 1780)
- April 19 – Claes Grill, Swedish merchant (d. 1767)
- April 21 – Jean-Pierre Aulneau, Jesuit missionary priest, briefly active in New France (d. 1736)
- April 23 – Erasmus James Philipps, serving member on Nova Scotia Council (1730–1760) (d. 1760)
- May 1 – Nathaniel Elliot, English Jesuit scholar (d. 1780)
- May 5 – John Campbell, 4th Earl of Loudoun, Scottish nobleman and army officer (d. 1782)
- May 6 – Christian Gärtner, German telescope maker and astronomer (d. 1782)
- May 8 – António José da Silva, Portuguese dramatist born in colonial Brazil (d. 1739)
- May 10 – Alexander Luttrell (d. 1737)
- May 13 – Johan Lorentz Castenschiold, Dutch-Danish landowner who was ennobled (d. 1747)
- June 1 – Carl Marcus Tuscher, German-born Danish polymath (d. 1751)
- June 9
  - Jan Paweł Biretowski (d. 1781)
  - Francis Blackburne, English Anglican churchman and activist (d. 1787)
- June 10 – Charles Frederick Albert, Margrave of Brandenburg-Schwedt (d. 1762)
- June 21 – Samuel Edwards, American silversmith (d. 1762)

=== July–September ===
- July 1 – Sir Alexander Grant, 5th Baronet (d. 1772)
- July 23 – Francis Blomefield, English antiquarian (d. 1752)
- August 8 – Gustaaf Willem van Imhoff, Dutch colonial administrator for the Dutch East India Company (VOC) (d. 1750)
- August 12 – Jonathan Clarke, American silversmith active in Newport (d. 1770)
- August 15 – Joseph Wanton, merchant, governor of the Colony of Rhode Island and Providence Plantations (d. 1780)
- August 18
  - Emanuel Büchel, Swiss painter (d. 1775)
  - Louis Phélypeaux, comte de Saint-Florentin (d. 1777)
- August 20
  - James Balfour, philosopher (d. 1795)
  - Henry Bromley, 1st Baron Montfort (d. 1755)
- August 30 – David Hartley, English philosopher (d. 1757)
- September 2 – Abraham Tucker, English country gentleman (d. 1774)
- September 5 – Élisabeth Alexandrine de Bourbon, French princess of the blood (d. 1765)
- September 7 – Matthäus Günther, German painter and artist of the Baroque and Rococo era (d. 1788)
- September 19
  - Marguerite-Antoinette Couperin, French harpsichordist (d. 1778)
  - William Craven, 5th Baron Craven, English nobleman and Member of Parliament (d. 1769)
- September 21 (bapt.) – Dick Turpin, English thief and highwayman (hanged 1739)
- September 23 – Joseph, Hereditary Prince of Hesse-Rotenburg (d. 1744)
- September 24 – Leopold Josef Graf Daun, Austrian field marshal (d. 1766)
- September 28
  - Henry Fox, 1st Baron Holland, English statesman (d. 1774)
  - Johann Peter Kellner, German organist and composer (d. 1772)

=== October–December ===
- October 3 – Jacques-Joachim Trotti, marquis de La Chétardie, French diplomat who engineered the coup d'état that brought Elizaveta Petrovna to the Russian throne in 1741 (d. 1759)
- October 8 – Yakov Shakhovskoy (d. 1777)
- October 12 – Emmanuel Héré de Corny, court architect to Stanisław Leszczyński (d. 1763)
- October 23 – Maximilian Ulysses Browne, Austrian military officer (d. 1757)
- October 25 – Johann Friedrich Endersch, German cartographer and mathematician (d. 1769)
- October 31 – Pope Clement XIV (d. 1774)
- November 1 – Antoine Terrasson, French author (d. 1782)
- November 4 – Louis-Élisabeth de La Vergne de Tressan, French soldier (d. 1783)
- November 5
  - William Baker, English merchant and politician (d. 1770)
  - Louis-Gabriel Guillemain, French composer and violinist (d. 1770)
- November 15 – Sir Halswell Tynte, 3rd Baronet (d. 1730)
- November 17 – Andrea Casali (d. 1784)
- November 23 – Thomas Birch, English historian (d. 1766)
- November 24 – Christian Moritz Graf Königsegg und Rothenfels (d. 1778)
- November 29 – Michael Christian Festing, English violinist and composer (d. 1752)
- November 30 – Jonathan Parsons, Christian New England clergyman during the late colonial period, supporter of the American Revolution (d. 1776)
- December 6 – Andrés de la Calleja, Spanish painter (d. 1785)
- December 9 – Faustina Pignatelli, Italian mathematician (d. 1769)
- December 14
  - Wiguläus von Kreittmayr, Bavarian jurist and public official (d. 1790)
  - Queen Seonui, wife and Queen Consort of King Gyeongjong of Joseon (d. 1730)
- December 20
  - George Fothergill (d. 1760)
  - Antonio Palomba, Italian opera librettist (d. 1769)
- December 27 – Prince Frederick Henry Eugen of Anhalt-Dessau, German prince of the House of Ascania (d. 1781)
- December 30 – Georg Wolfgang Knorr, German engraver and naturalist (d. 1761)

== Deaths ==
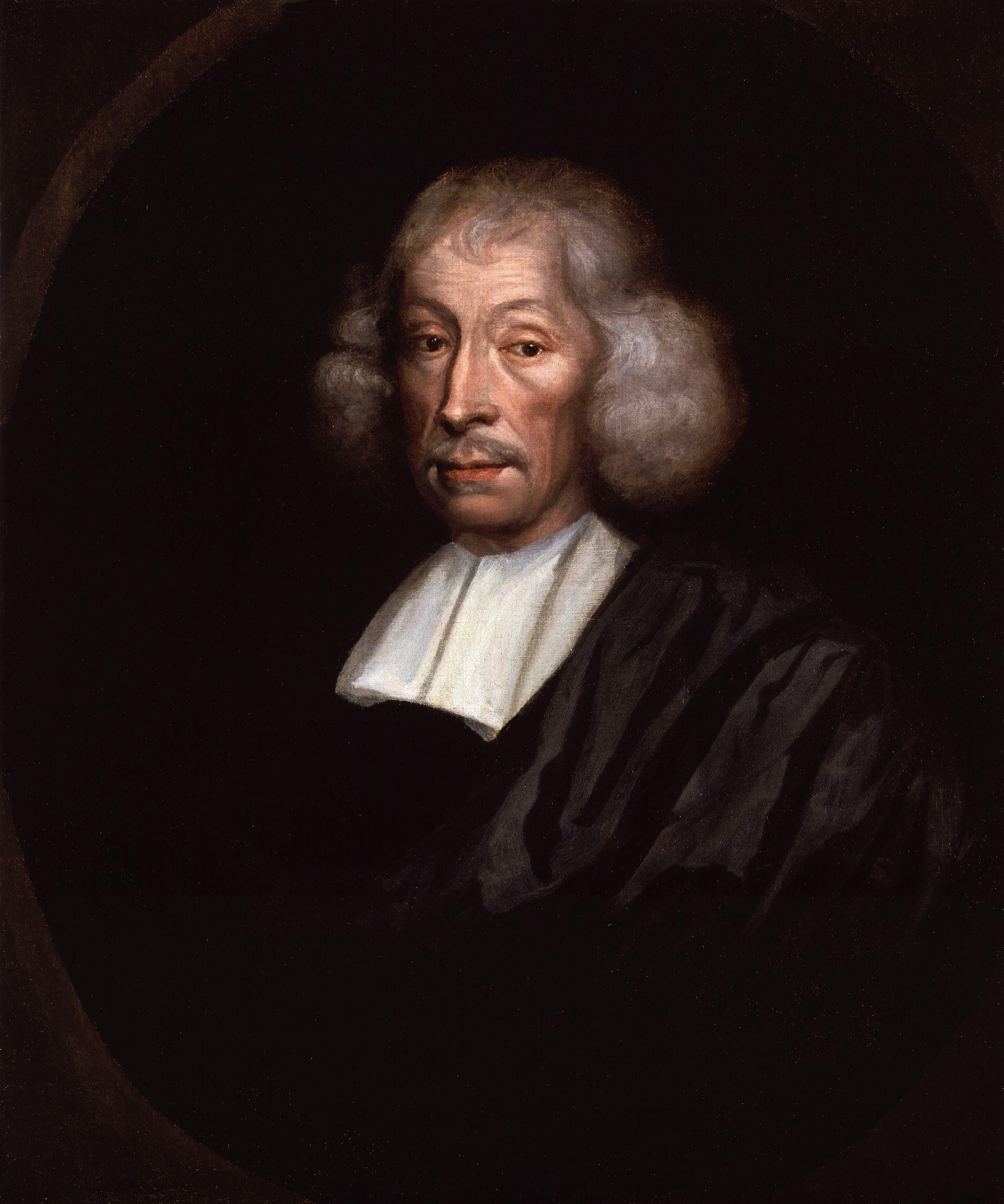
John Ray died 17 January

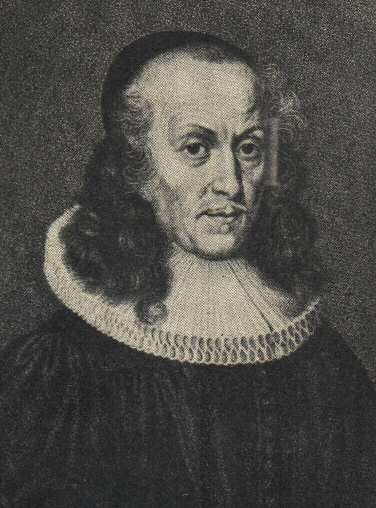
Philipp Spener died 5 February

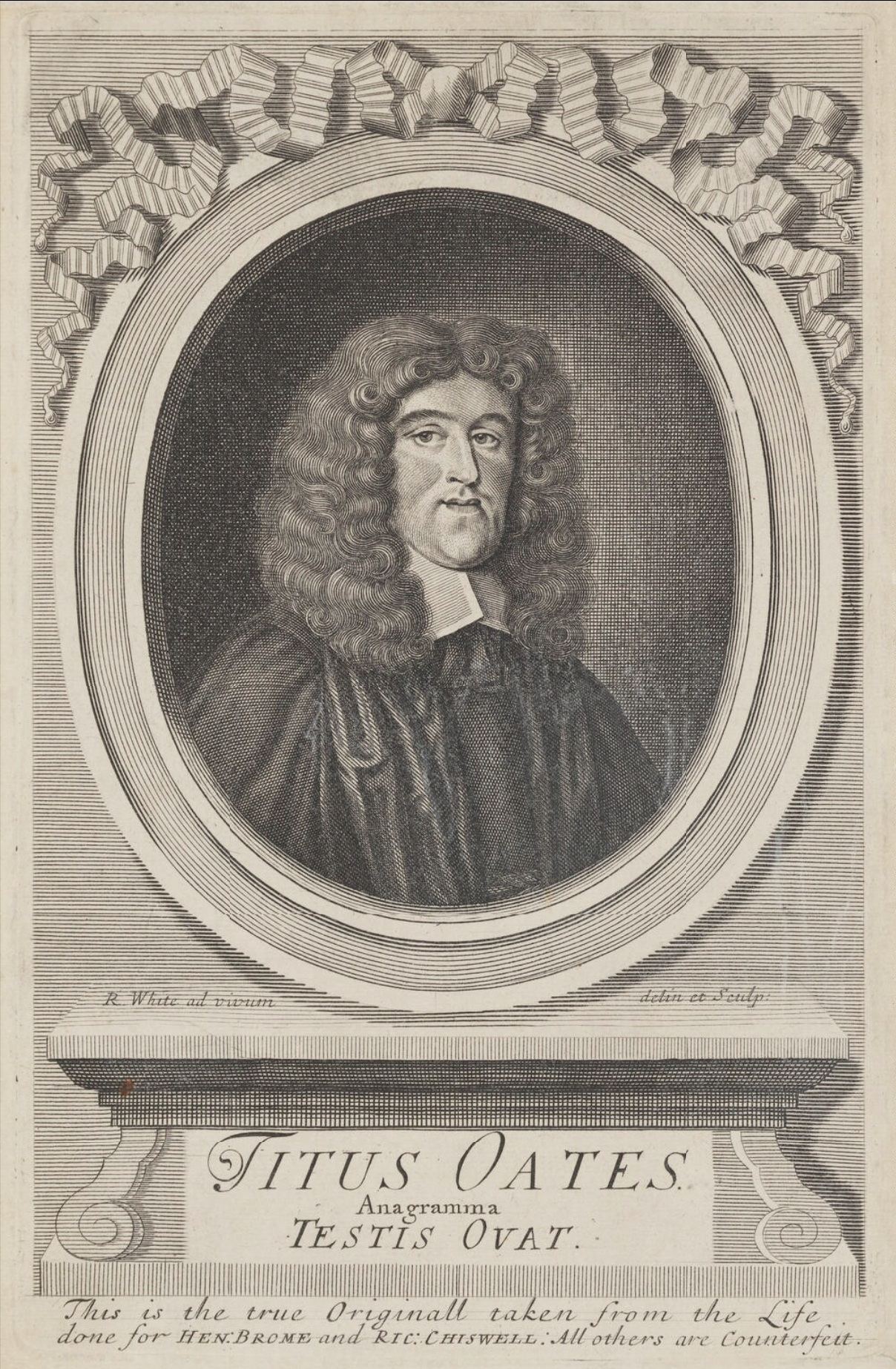
Titus Oates died 13 July

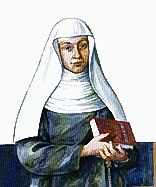
Maria Hueber died 31 July

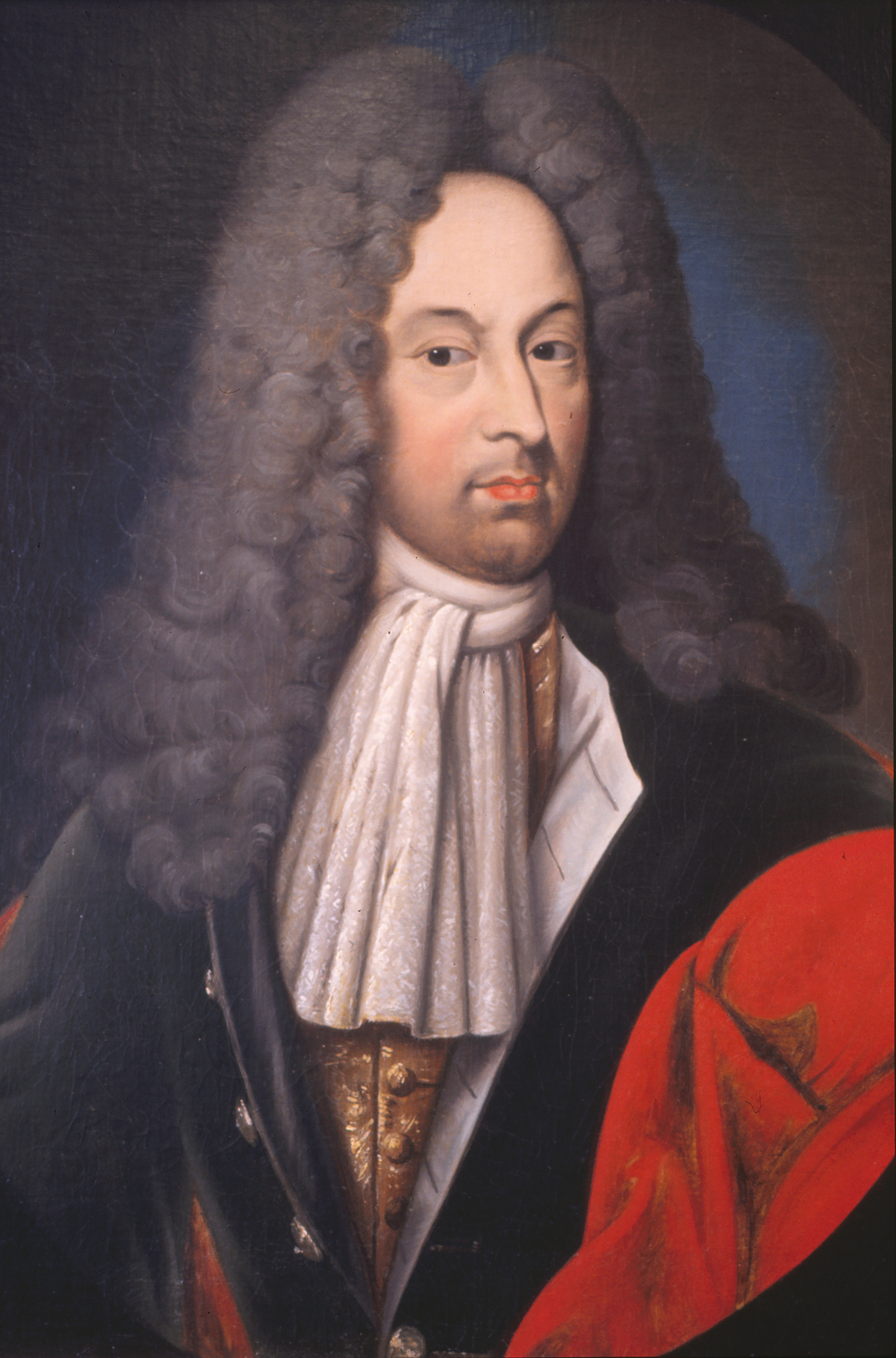
Albert Angell died 13 September

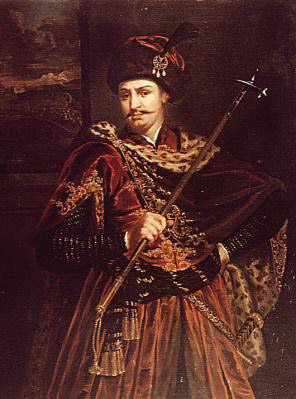
Emeric Thököly died 13 September

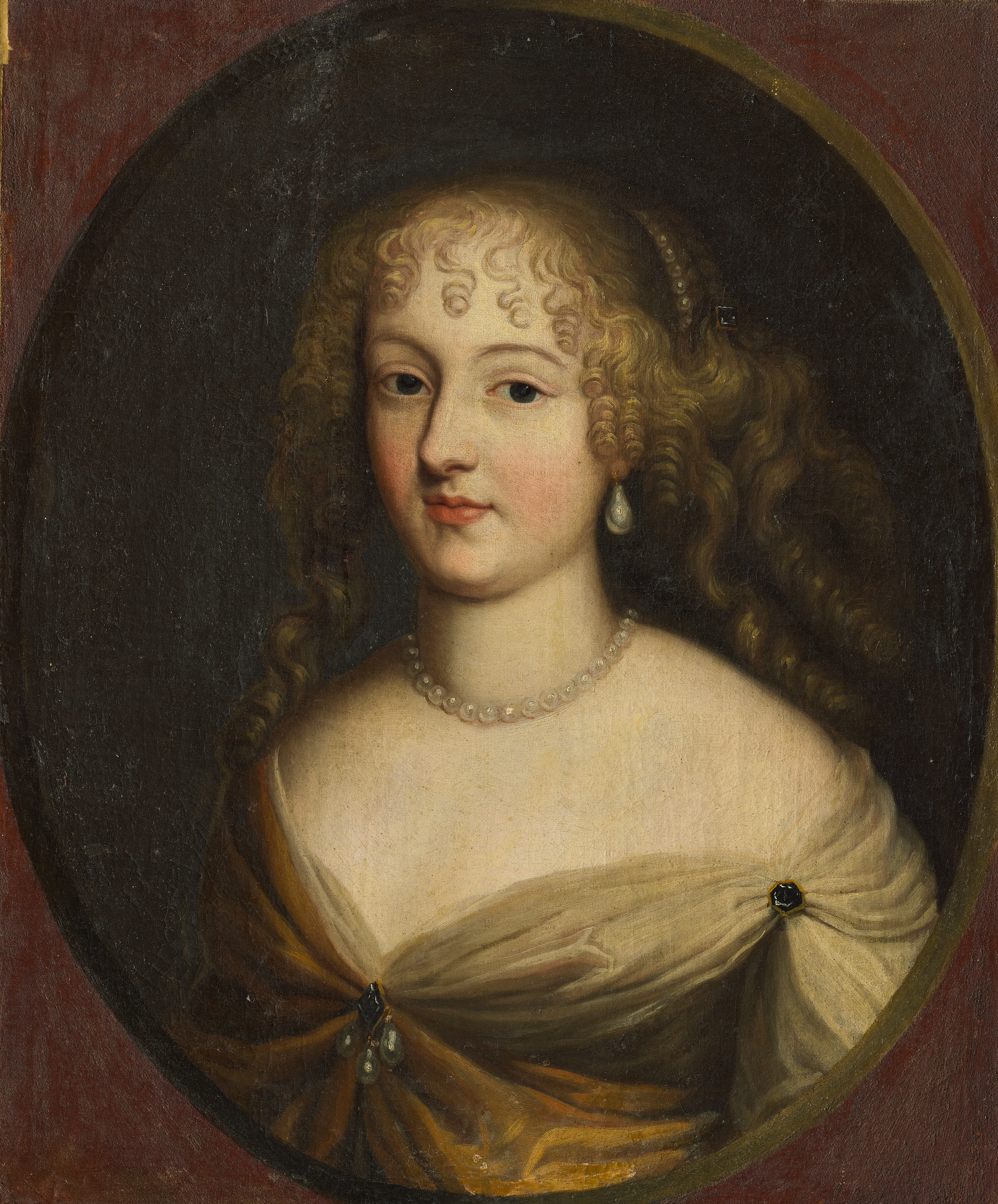
Ninon de l'Enclos died 17 October

=== January–March ===
- January 7 – Giovanni Battista Spínola, Roman Catholic prelate, Archbishop of Genoa (1694–1705) (b. 1625)
- January 10 – Johannes van Haensbergen, Dutch Golden Age painter (b. 1642)
- January 12 – Luca Giordano, Italian artist (b. 1634)
- January 14 – Madame d'Aulnoy (b. 1650)
- January 17 – John Ray, English naturalist (b. 1627)
- January 21 – Claude-François Ménestrier, French heraldist, Jesuit, courtier (b. 1631)
- February 1 – Sophia Charlotte of Hanover, first Queen consort in Prussia as wife of King Frederick I (b. 1668)
- February 5 – Philipp Spener, German Christian theologian known as the Father of Pietism (b. 1635)
- February 13 – Charles Auger, French colonial administrator (b. 1644)
- February 15 – Jean-Baptiste de Gennes (b. 1656)
- February 18 – William "Tangier" Smith, Moroccan mayor (b. 1655)
- March 10 – John Temple, Irish politician (b. 1632)
- March 13 – Curt Christoph von Koppelow (b. 1624)
- March 22 – Christian Heinrich Postel, German jurist (b. 1658)

=== April–June ===
- April 2 – John Howe, English Puritan theologian (b. 1630)
- April 5 – Itō Jinsai, Japanese philosopher (b. 1627)
- April 6 – Odoardo Cibo, Roman Catholic prelate and Titular Patriarch of Constantinople (1689–1705) (b. 1619)
- April 17 – Uldericus Nardi, Roman Catholic prelate and Bishop of Bagnoregio (1698–1705) (b. 1637)
- May 5
  - Johann Ernst Glück, German theologian, translator (b. 1652)
  - Leopold I, Holy Roman Emperor (b. 1640)
- June 10 – Michael Wigglesworth, Puritan minister (b. 1631)

=== July–September ===
- July 5 – Alonso Antonio de San Martín, Roman Catholic prelate, Bishop of Cuenca (1681–1705) and Bishop of Oviedo (1675–1681) (b. 1642)
- July 13 – Titus Oates, English priest who fabricated the "Popish Plot" (b. 1649)
- July 27 – Elizabeth Wilbraham (b. 1632)
- July 30 – Nathaniel Felton, landowner in the Massachusetts Bay Colony and served as a juryman (b. 1615)
- July 31
  - Lucio Borghesi, Roman Catholic prelate, Bishop of Chiusi (1682–1705) (b. 1642)
  - Maria Hueber, Catholic nun (b. 1653)
- August 6 – Johann Ferdinand of Auersperg, second Prince of Auersperg and Duke of Silesia-Münsterberg from 1677 until his death (b. 1655)
- August 13 – Françoise-Marguerite de Sévigné, French aristocrat (b. 1646)
- August 16 – Jacob Bernoulli, Swiss mathematician (b. 1654)
- August 28
  - Ludvig Stoud, Danish-Norwegian theologian and priest (b. 1649)
  - George William, Duke of Brunswick-Lüneburg (b. 1624)
- September 2 – Giacinto Camillo Maradei, Roman Catholic prelate, Bishop of Policastro (1696–(b. 1636)
- September 4 – Peter Barwick, English physician and author (b. 1619)
- September 12 – Sir John Hoskyns, 2nd Baronet, English politician (b. 1634)
- September 13
  - Albert Angell, Norwegian civil servant (b. 1660)
  - Prince George of Hesse-Darmstadt, Field Marshal in the Austrian army (b. 1669)
  - Emeric Thököly, Hungarian nobleman (b. 1657)
- September 17 – Gregorio Compagni, Roman Catholic prelate, Bishop of Larino (1703–1705) and Bishop of Sansepolcro (1696–1705) (b. 1640)
- September 26 – Tommaso d'Aquino, bishop of Sessa Aurunca (b. 1635)
- September 30 – Anne Camm, early British Quaker preacher (b. 1627)

=== October–December ===
- October 9 – Johann Christoph Wagenseil, German Christian Hebraist (b. 1633)
- October 11 – Guillaume Amontons, French physicist and instrument maker (b. 1663)
- October 17 – Ninon de l'Enclos, French author (b. 1620)
- October 27 – Thyrsus González de Santalla, Spanish theologian, 13th Superior General of the Society of Jesus (b. 1624)
- November 6 – John Platt, American settler (b. 1632)
- November 10 – Justine Siegemund, German midwife (b. 1636)
- November 15 – Margravine Dorothea Charlotte of Brandenburg-Ansbach, German noblewoman (b. 1661)
- November 21 – John Deming, early Puritan settler and original patentee of the Connecticut Colony (b. c. 1615)
- November 23 – Prince William of Denmark, youngest son of Christian V of Denmark and Charlotte Amalie of Hesse-Kassel (b. 1687)
- December 7 – William Lowther, English landowner and politician (b. 1639)
- December 12 – John Easton, political leader in the Colony of Rhode Island and Providence Plantations (b. 1624)
- December 18 – Valentin Stansel, Czech Jesuit astronomer who worked in Brazil (b. 1621)
- December 22 – Bhai Bachittar Singh, Indian Sikh martyr (b. 1664)
- December 23 – Princess Luise Dorothea of Prussia (b. 1680)
- December 26 – Fateh Singh, fourth and youngest son of Guru Gobind Singh (b. 1697)
- December 31 – Catherine of Braganza, widowed queen consort of Charles II of England and regent of Portugal (b. 1638)
- date unknown – Meg Shelton, alleged witch from Lancashire
