= Alcohol preferences in Europe =

Map of Europe with individual countries grouped by preferred type of alcoholic drink, based on recorded alcohol per capita (age 15+) consumption (in litres of pure alcohol) in 2016 Wine Beer Spirits

Map of Europe with individual countries grouped into three regions by dominant patterns of alcohol consumption and traditionally preferred types of alcoholic drink Wine-drinking countries/Mediterranean pattern) Beer-drinking countries/Central European pattern) Spirit-drinking countries/Eastern/Northern European pattern) Both Denmark and Slovakia are categorized either as beer-drinking countries or as spirit-drinking countries.

Alcohol preferences in Europe vary from country to country between beer, wine or spirits. These preferences are traditionally associated with certain regions. Hence, the Central European pattern of alcohol consumption is associated with beer-drinking, the Mediterranean pattern with wine-drinking and the Eastern or Northern European pattern with spirit-drinking countries. However, traditional preferences do not necessarily correspond to current drinking habits, as beer has become the most popular alcoholic drink world-wide.

== Countries preferring spirits ==
The following countries, known as the vodka belt, are significant producers and consumers of spirits, particularly vodka:

- Sweden
- Norway
- Iceland
- Finland
- Estonia
- Latvia (preferring beer as well)
- Lithuania (preferring beer as well)
- Russia
- Belarus
- Ukraine
- Poland (preferring beer as well)
- Slovakia (preferring beer as well)

The southern boundary of this region corresponds to the −2 °C (28 °F) January isotherm in lowlands. With the exception of Slovakia, Poland, Ukraine, and some regions of southern Russia, cultivation of grapes is impossible or very difficult. EU-countries preferring vodka produce over 70% of the EU's vodka.

Vodka preference is sometimes associated exclusively with the Slavic countries of Central and Eastern Europe, as they are the historical homeland of vodka (Poland and Russia being the nations most often associated with the invention of the drink). Before the 19th century, vodka was considered very much a "people's drink" that was common among the peasantry who made up the majority of the population in most countries of the time, while the aristocracy preferred imported wines or other alcoholic drinks that were considered less plebeian. There are exceptions, such as Żubrówka, a type of Polish vodka that dates back to the 16th century, which became popular among the szlachta (nobility) as well as the peasantry as early as the 18th century.

In his book about the Soviet Union, Alex de Jonge elaborates on his concept of "geoalcoholics". In particular, he explains Russian peculiarities by their belonging to the vodka belt and the absence of the beer belt in the Soviet Union. Other than the prevalent hard liquor, the vodka belt is also characterised by a higher occurrence of binge drinking compared to the rest of Europe. Likewise, in his Russia and the Russians, historian Geoffrey Hoskins notes the distinct effect vodka culture has had on the countries of the former Russian Empire, creating drinking as a social problem on a different level from other European countries.

In many countries traditionally preferring vodka, it has been supplanted by beer as the alcoholic drink of choice since the early 21st century. Residents of Finland and Sweden consume twice as much beer as vodka (in terms of pure alcohol). The Polish Beer-Lovers' Party (which won 16 seats in the Sejm in 1991) was founded on the notion of fighting alcoholism by a cultural abandonment of vodka for beer. And indeed in 1998, beer surpassed vodka as the most popular alcoholic drink in Poland.

The term has received much attention since 2006 in the context of the "vodka war" within the European Union about the standardisation of vodka: the vodka-preferring countries insist that only spirits produced from grains and potato must be allowed to be branded as "vodka", according to the long established traditions of its production, a brand protection similar to the "protected designation of origin". The "Schnellhardt compromise", proposed by Horst Schnellhardt, suggests that vodkas from other than cereals, potatoes and molasses, should be labeled to say "Vodka produced from".

== Countries preferring beer ==
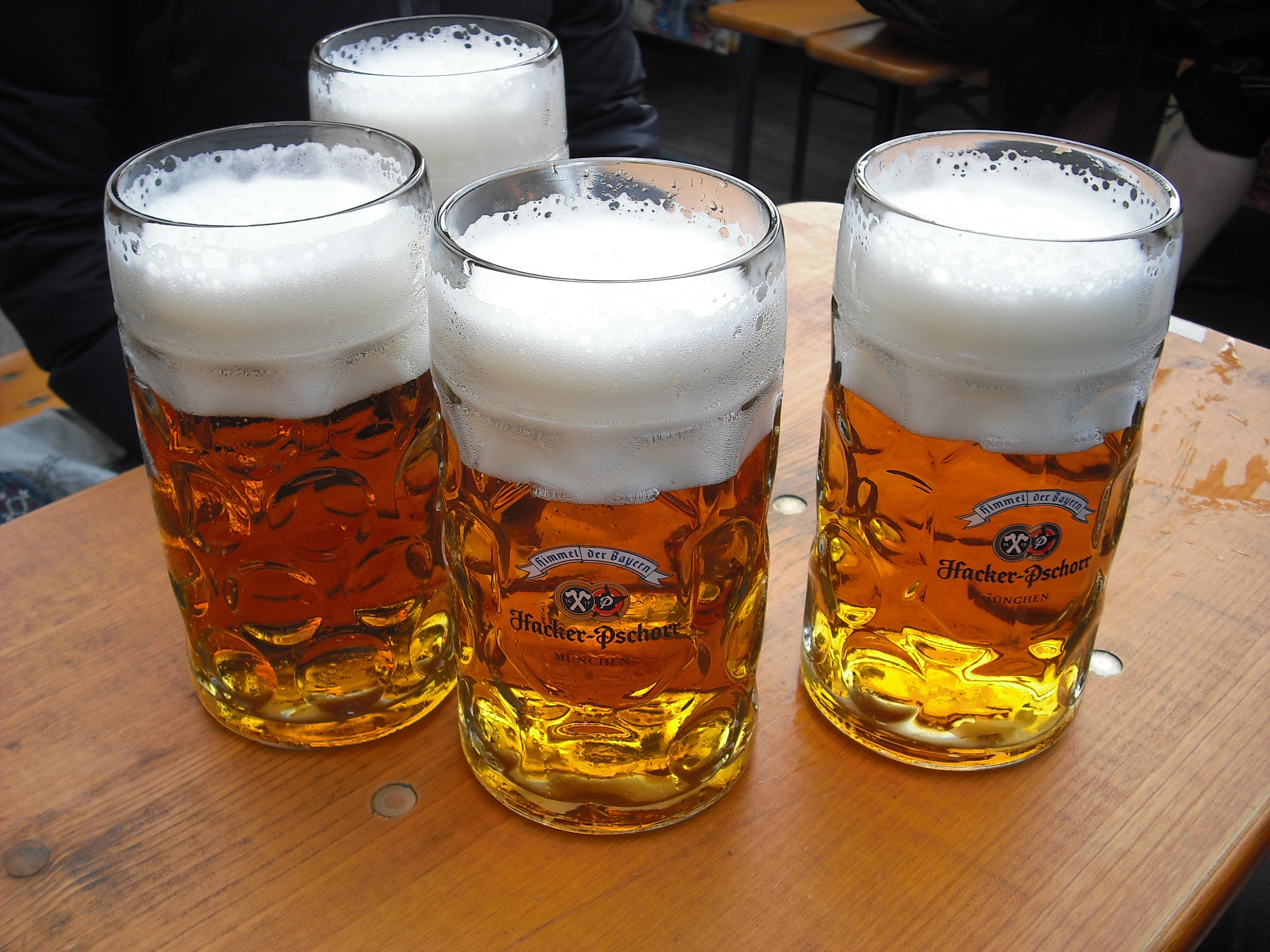
Munich, Germany, is the site of Oktoberfest, the world's largest beer festival.

Countries in Europe in which beer is historically the most popular alcoholic drink, informally known as the beer belt are located to the southwest of countries preferring vodka ("vodka belt") and to the northeast of the countries preferring wine ("wine belt").

These countries' geography is closely tied to the historical growing range of its two main ingredients, barley and hops. Barley was first domesticated during the Neolithic in the ancient Near East. It has been brewed into beer-like beverages for thousands of years and grown in most of Europe since ancient times. Hops are more narrowly distributed, preferring humid temperate climates, similar to potatoes. Originally, European "ale" (not yet called beer in Germanic languages) was produced without hops, which were introduced to Europe from the east. The first evidence of hops in Europe dates from 736 CE, in the Hallertau region of present-day Germany, although the first mention of the use of hops in brewing in that country was not until 1079.

The westward spread of hops was slow, not reaching England until 1524. Ireland was still importing hops in the eighteenth century; more than 500 tons of English hops were imported through Dublin alone in 1752. In 1516, the Bavarian Reinheitsgebot ("Purity Law") established that barley, hops and water were the only allowable ingredients in beer (yeast was considered a by-product rather than an ingredient). This became the template for beers across Europe. While non-barley beers (e.g. wheat beer), and non-hopped-beers (e.g. flavoured with gruit) are still produced, across most of Europe "beer" is synonymous with barley and hops. Since the northern range of hops does not include most of Scandinavia or Russia (or much of Scotland), these areas, for the most part, are outside of the beer belt and lie in the vodka/whisky belt.

As of 2012 the beer-preferring countries include Belgium, Ireland, the United Kingdom, the Netherlands, Denmark, Germany, some parts of Austria, Luxembourg, Czech Republic, Slovakia, Poland, Slovenia, Central Federal District of Russia, the northern and eastern (German-speaking) cantons of Switzerland and the French regions of Alsace, Lorraine, Nord-Pas-de-Calais and the department of Ardennes. There is quite a bit of overlap in these French regions, as well as in southwestern Germany, Luxembourg and most parts of Austria, due to the considerable consumption and cultivation of fine wine there, and Poland is also a part of the vodka belt. The same applies to Latvia and Lithuania (in a lesser extent to Estonia as well), where beer and honey beer has been a traditional drink for centuries and is a traditional part of celebrations like Jāņi and the Saint Jonas's Festival.

In 2016, UNESCO inscribed Belgian beer culture on their list of the intangible cultural heritage of humanity.

== Countries preferring wine ==
Countries in Europe in which wine is historically the most popular alcoholic drink, informally known as the wine belt, are located to the south of beer belt and vodka belt. The wine belt has been variously defined as approximately spanning 41–44°N, 30–50°N, and 35–50/51°N.

Countries in the wine belt include Spain, Portugal, Italy, Greece, Georgia, Cyprus, Albania, Kosovo, North Macedonia, Serbia, Montenegro, Croatia, Bulgaria, San Marino, Switzerland, Romania, France, and Southern Federal District of Russia. The countries of Austria, Hungary, and Slovenia, which themselves produce some highly regarded wines, may sometimes be considered as part of the wine belt, but they overlap largely and are in line more with the Beer Belt instead. Additionally, Southwest England (if one classes cider as a wine analogue), parts of the Low Countries, southwestern Germany and parts of Austria could be considered to lie either within the belt or within an overlap region.

A number of countries in Southeast Europe that fall within the wine belt also produce a variety of fruit brandies, many of which are considered their "national drink", such as Țuică, Rakia, and Pálinka.

The UNESCO has declared some wine regions in its World Heritage Sites:

- Austria: Wachau valley
- France: Jurisdiction of Saint-Emilion, Bourgundy's climats, Champagne hillsides, houses and cellars
- Hungary: Tokaj wine region
- Italy: Vineyard Landscape of Piedmont: Langhe-Roero and Monferrato, the traditional agricultural practice of cultivating the "vite ad alberello" (head-trained bush vines) of the community of Pantelleria and the Prosecco Hills of Conegliano and Valdobbiadene.
- Portugal: Alto Douro Wine Region and Landscape of the Pico Island Vineyard Culture
- Switzerland: Lavaux vineyard terraces

== See also ==
- List of national drinks
