= Vodka war =

Commerce disputes in Europe

Vodka war refers to heated discussions within the European Union about the definition of which hard liquors may or may not be branded as "vodka". The war was triggered by the actions of Diageo, who began marketing their Cîroc beverage as a vodka uniquely produced exclusively from grapes.

The countries of the EU "Vodka Belt" argue that only spirits made exclusively from cereals, potatoes and sugar beet molasses may be branded vodka. Other distillers insist on a broader definition. The Schnellhardt compromise, proposed by Horst Schnellhardt, suggests that vodkas made from items other than cereals, potatoes and molasses should say "Vodka produced from..." on the label.

On 20 February 2006, Poland put a demand to restrict the definition of Vodka within EU, and the move was supported by the vodka belt countries and Germany. This demand was triggered by a 2005 European Commission proposal to split vodka category into several subcategories basing on the flavor and raw materials.

If the "Vodka Belt" prevails, it will significantly influence the global US$12 billion annual vodka market. In particular, some drinks presently marketed as vodka will have to be re-branded.

The issue goes beyond the EU: The United States is the world's fastest-growing vodka producer, and if its non-traditional vodkas are excluded from the EU, it may retaliate in the World Trade Organization.

Opponents of modifying the present definition, which states vodka as "a spirit drink produced from ethyl alcohol of agricultural origin", argue that citing traditions and cultures as justification for imposing a restrictive vodka definition is a tactic to exclude other vodka producers.

== Arguments for restricted definition ==
- Vodka must be clearly defined in the same way as has been done for other hard liquors, such as brandy or whiskey, in terms of raw ingredients and manufacturing process.
- A restricted definition protects the quality and the originality of the product, in accord with the long-established traditions of its production, a brand protection similar to the "Protected designation of origin".

== Arguments for broad definition ==
- Traditionalists maintain that each good vodka has its own distinct flavour.
- Threat of trade wars.
- The proposal is seen as an attempt to monopolise the vodka market by the Vodka Belt
- The restriction may hamper innovation, in the opinion of the UK representatives in the European Vodka Alliance.
- The restriction may hamper US exports and lead to retaliation, since the United States is one of the largest vodka importers from the EU (US$500 million).

== Schnellhardt compromise ==
The compromise was adopted by the EU's Environment Committee on 30 January 2007. It states that the label may say simply "vodka" if the product was made from cereals, grains, or molasses. In all other cases it must say "Vodka made of..." Since then it was negotiated with the agriculture ministers, and further compromises have been proposed, e.g., the initial requirement of prominent print size was suggested to be dropped.

On 19 June 2007, The European Parliament voted for the compromise. In late August the position of the WTO is expected to be known, and the EU agriculture ministers will debate and vote on the issue in September.

Poland sees the EU's decision as "wódka war lost". Polish MEP Ryszard Czarnecki said "Would the French like champagne to be distilled from plums, and would the British accept whisky from apricots? That sounds like heresy. So please don't be surprised that we are refusing to recognise vodka made from waste." Polish vodka producers are going to fight back by forming the Polish Vodka Association, with the purpose of launching a public relations campaign abroad against the expected flood of cheap, poor quality vodkas. While the strong Polish brands, such as Wyborowa or Zubrowka, feel safe, the smaller producers are threatened by the competition against cheaper products.

== See also ==
- Smirnov Trading House, about another "vodka war" of "Smirnov" vs. "Smirnoff", ended in 1997
