= Vodka =

Clear distilled alcoholic beverage

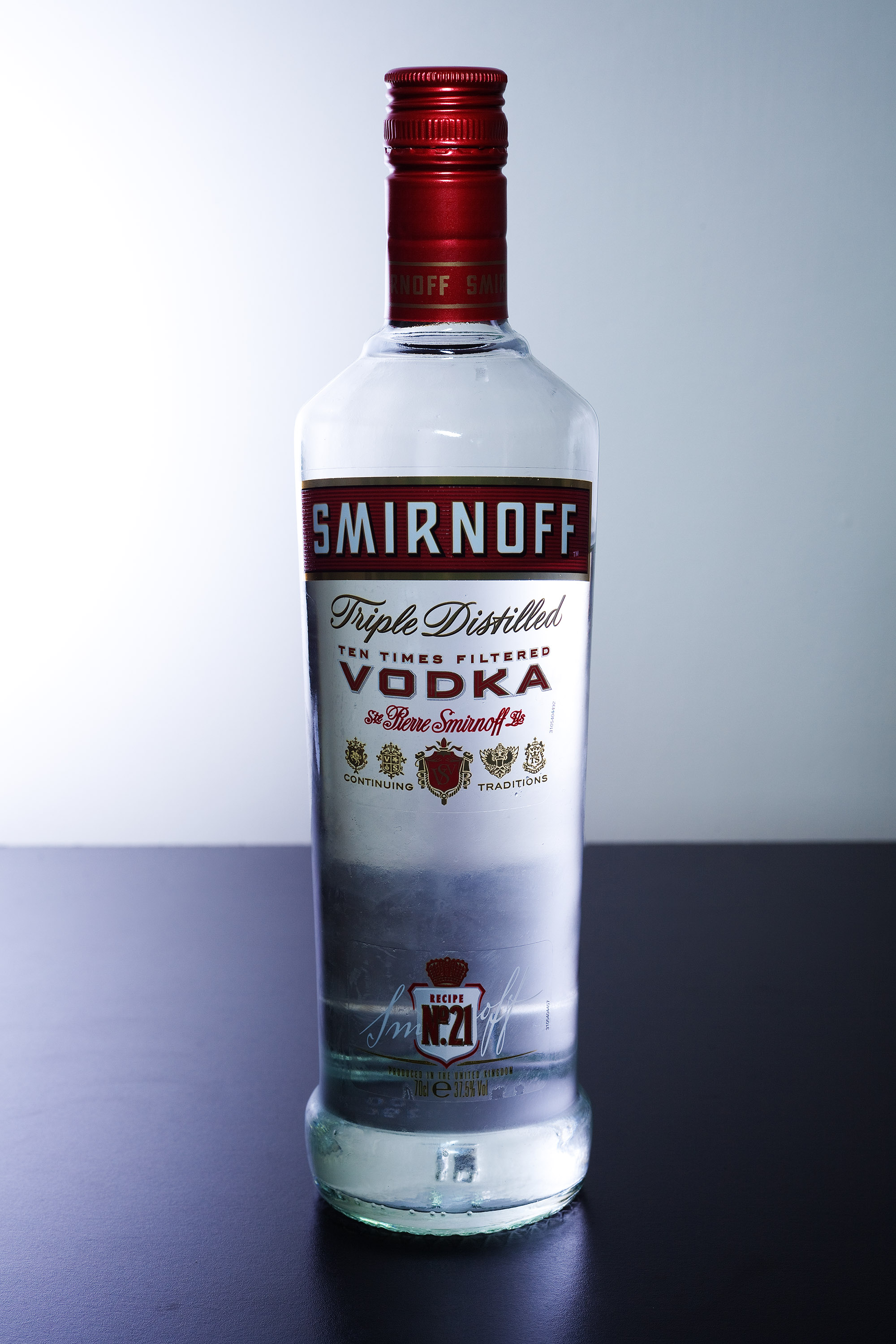
- Smirnoff Red Label vodka
- Type: Distilled alcoholic beverage
- Origin: Poland and Russia, Central, Northern and Eastern Europe
- Alcohol by volume: 35–40%
- Proof (US): 70–80°
- Color: Clear
- Ingredients: Water, Grains
- Related products: Flavored Vodka, Kornbrand, Nalewka

Vodka (Polish: wódka [ˈvutka]; Russian: водка [ˈvotkə]) is a clear distilled alcoholic beverage. Its varieties originated in Poland and Russia. Vodka is composed mainly of water and ethanol (alcohol), sometimes with traces of impurities and flavourings. Traditionally it is made by distilling liquid from fermented cereal grains and potatoes since the latter was introduced in Europe in the 18th century. Some modern brands use maize, sugar cane, fruit, honey, or maple sap as the base.

Since the 1890s, standard vodkas have been 40% alcohol by volume (ABV), or 80 U.S. proof. The European Union has established a minimum alcohol content of 37.5% for vodka. Vodka in the United States must have a minimum alcohol content of 40%.

Vodka is traditionally drunk "neat" (not mixed with water, ice, or other mixers), and it is often served freezer chilled in the so-called "vodka belt" of Belarus, Estonia, Finland, Iceland, Latvia, Lithuania, Norway, Poland, Russia, Sweden, and Ukraine. It is also used in cocktails and mixed drinks, such as the vodka martini, Cosmopolitan, vodka tonic, screwdriver, greyhound, Black or White Russian, Moscow mule, Bloody Mary, Caesar and Red Bull Vodka.

Since 1960s, the unflavoured Swedish brännvin has also been called vodka.

== Etymology ==
The word vodka in English was borrowed from Russian and it can be literally translated as 'little water'; it is a diminutive of the Russian word voda ('water'). (Note: Root vod- [water] + -k- (diminutive suffix, among other functions) + -a (ending of feminine gender).)

In English literature, the word vodka first appeared around the late 18th century. In a book of travels published in English in 1780 (presumably, a translation from German), Johann Gottlieb Georgi said that "kabak in the Russian language signifies a public house for the common people to drink vodka (a sort of brandy) in". In 1799, William Tooke glossed vodka as "rectified corn-spirits", using the traditional English sense of the word corn to refer to any grain, not just maize. In 1800, the French poet Théophile Gautier glossed it as a "grain liquor" served with meals in Poland (eau-de-vie de grain).

Another possible connection of vodka with water is the name of the medieval alcoholic beverage aqua vitae (Latin, literally, 'water of life'), which is reflected in Polish okowita, Ukrainian оковита, Belarusian акавіта, and Scandinavian akvavit. Whiskey has a similar etymology, from Irish and Scottish Gaelic uisce beatha / uisge-beatha.

People in the area of vodka's probable origin have names for vodka with roots meaning 'to burn': Polish: gorzała; Ukrainian: горілка, romanized: horilka; Belarusian: гарэлка, romanized: harelka; Lithuanian: degtinė; Samogitian: degtėnė is also in use, colloquially and in proverbs; Latvian: degvīns; Finnish: paloviina. In Russian during the 17th and 18th centuries, горящѣе вино or горячее вино (goryashchee vino 'burning wine' or 'hot wine') was widely used. Others languages include German Branntwein, Danish brændevin, Dutch: brandewijn, Swedish: brännvin, and Norwegian: brennevin (although the latter terms refer to any strong alcoholic beverage).

== History ==
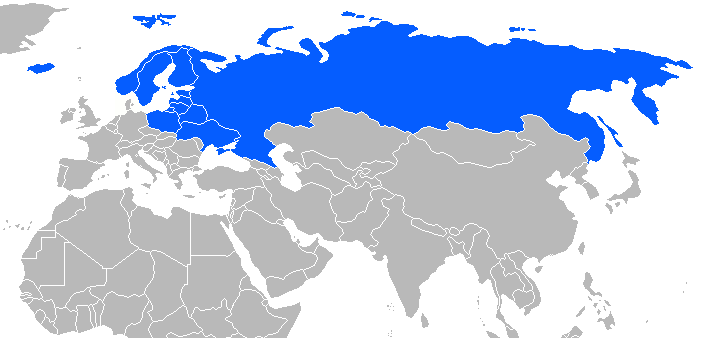
The "vodka belt" countries of Northern, Central, and Eastern Europe are the historic home of vodka. These countries have the highest vodka consumption in the world.

Scholars debate the beginnings of vodka. There is little historical material available, but it has been linked to the Slavic world for centuries, with Poles and Russians disputing its creation.

For many centuries, beverages differed significantly compared to the vodka of today, as the spirit at that time had a different flavor, color, and smell, and was originally used as medicine. It contained little alcohol, an estimated maximum of about 14%. Distillation techniques were developed in Roman Egypt by the 3rd century, but the description of aqua ardens ("burning water", i.e., alcohol) made by distilling wine with salt appears in Latin works only by the 12th century. The process was well known among European medieval chemists by about 1300.

=== Poland ===
The world's first written mention of the word wódka was in 1405 from Akta Grodzkie recorder of deeds, in the court documents from the Palatinate of Sandomierz in Poland. At the time, the word wódka referred to chemical compounds such as medicines and cosmetics' cleansers. The production of liquor begins in the mid-15th century, with varied local traditions emerging throughout Europe, in Poland as vodka (Polish: wódka or gorzałka). In the 16th century, the Polish word for the beverage was gorzałka (from the Old Polish verb gorzeć meaning "to burn"), which is also the source of Ukrainian horilka (горілка). The word written in Cyrillic appeared first in 1533, about a medicinal drink brought from Poland to Russia by the Russian merchants.

In these early days, the spirits were used mostly as medicines. Stefan Falimierz asserted in his 1534 works on herbs that vodka could serve "to increase fertility and awaken lust". Wodka lub gorzałka (1614), by Jerzy Potański, contains valuable information on the production of vodka. Jakub Kazimierz Haur, in his book Skład albo skarbiec znakomitych sekretów ekonomii ziemiańskiej (A Treasury of Excellent Secrets about Landed Gentry's Economy, Kraków, 1693), gave detailed recipes for making vodka from rye.

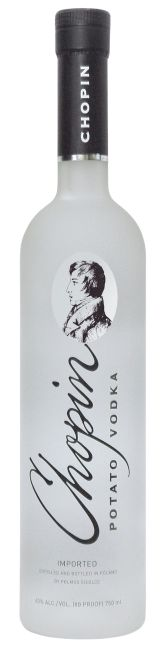
Chopin

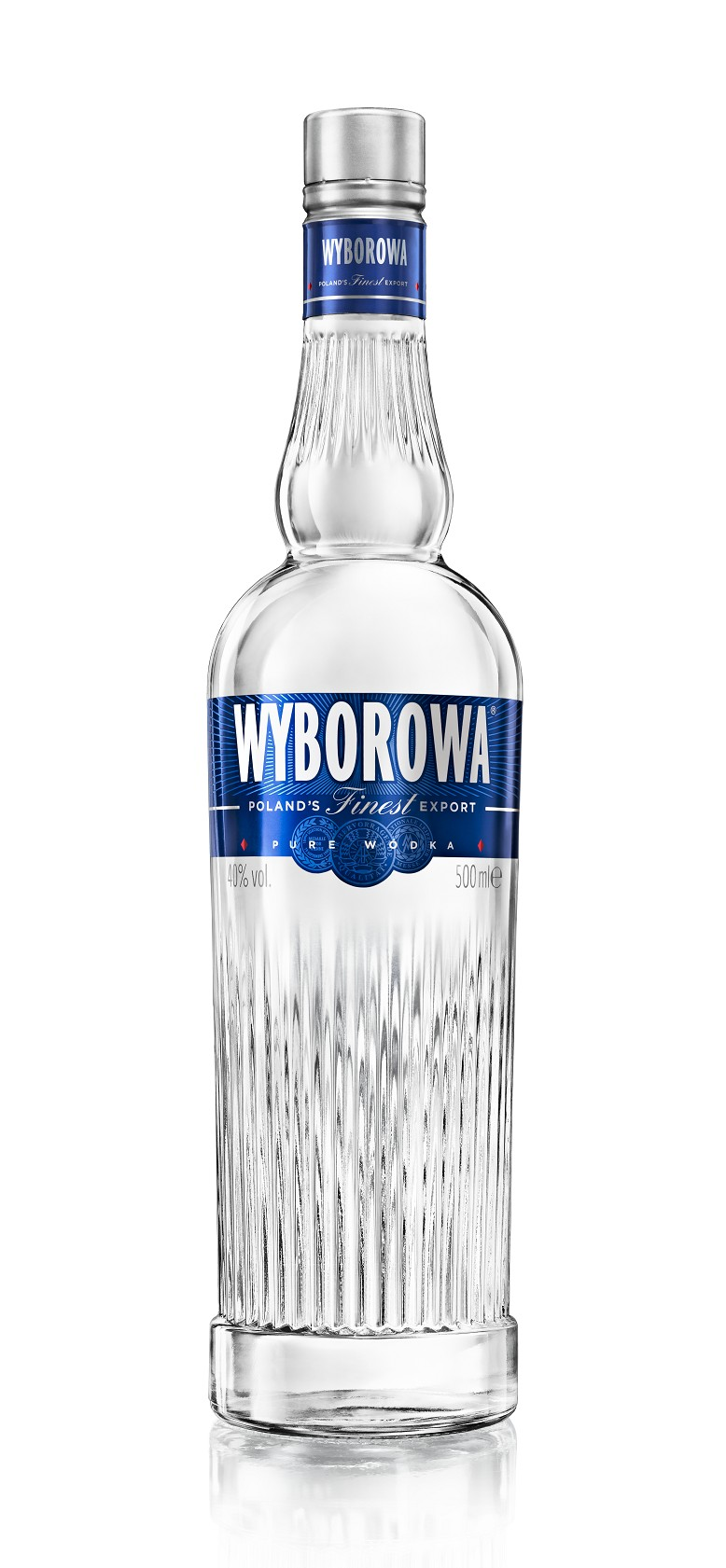
Wyborowa

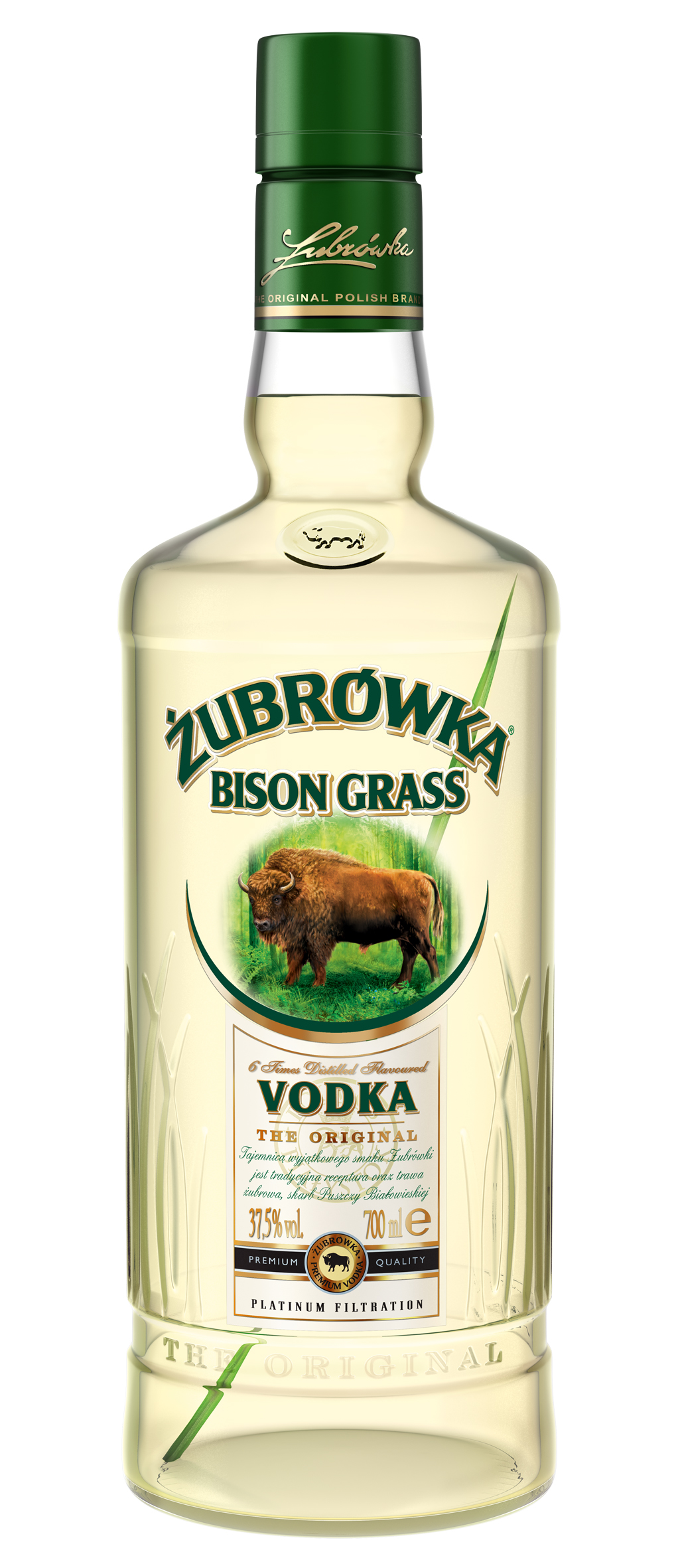
Żubrówka

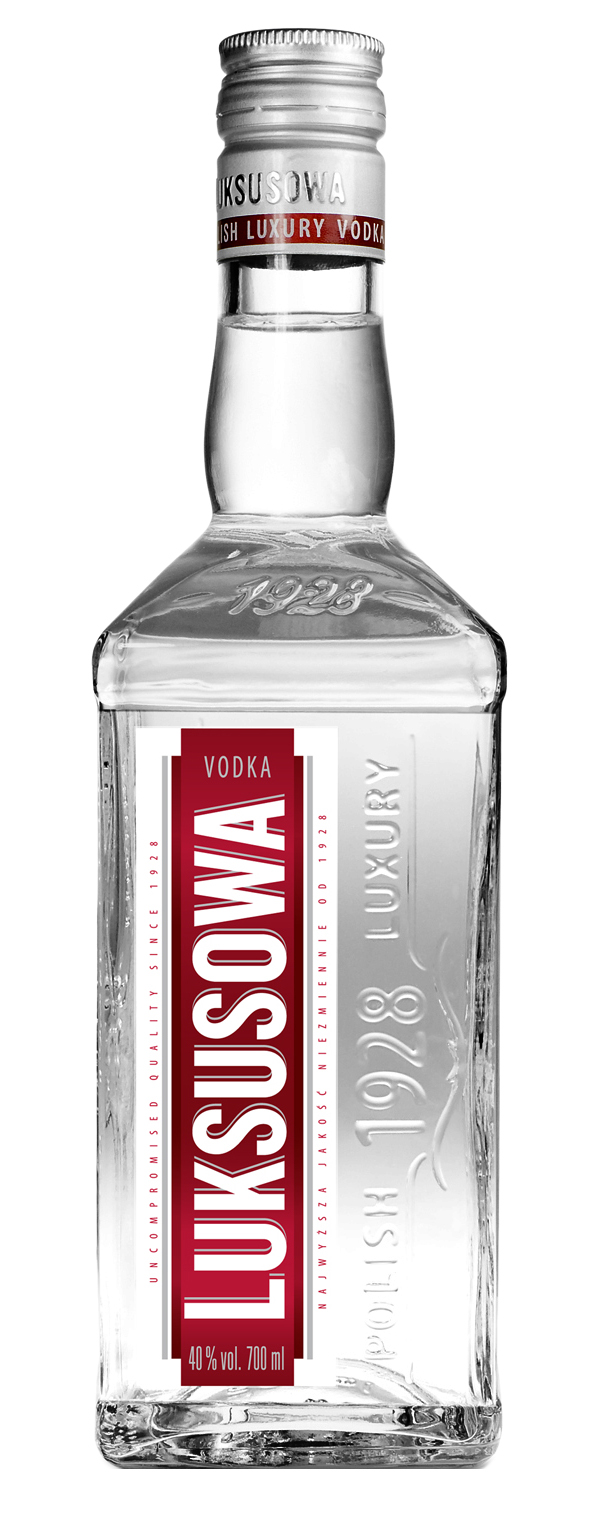
Luksusowa

Vodka production on a much larger scale began in Poland at the end of the 16th century, initially at Kraków, whence spirits were exported to Silesia before 1550. Silesian cities also bought vodka from Poznań, a city that in 1580 had 498 working spirits distilleries. However, Gdańsk soon surpassed both these cities. In the 17th and 18th centuries, Polish vodka was known in the Netherlands, Denmark, England, Russia, Germany, Austria, Hungary, Romania, Ukraine, Bulgaria and the Black Sea basin.

Early production methods were rudimentary. The beverage was usually low-proof, and the distillation process had to be repeated several times (a three-stage distillation process was common). The first distillate was called brantówka, the second was szumówka, and the third was okowita (from aqua vitae), which generally contained 70–80% ABV. Then the beverage was watered down, yielding a simple vodka (30–35% ABV), or a stronger one if the watering was done using an alembic. The exact production methods were described in 1768 by Jan Paweł Biretowski and in 1774 by Jan Chryzostom Pasek. The late 18th century inaugurated the production of vodka from various unusual substances including even the carrot.

Though there was a substantial vodka cottage industry in Poland back to the 16th century, the end of the 18th century marked the start of real industrial production of vodka in Poland (Kresy, the eastern part of Poland, was part of the Russian Empire at that time). Vodkas produced by the nobility and clergy became a mass product. The first industrial distillery was opened in 1782 in Lwów by J. A. Baczewski. He was soon followed by Jakub Haberfeld, who in 1804 established a factory at Oświęcim, and by Hartwig Kantorowicz, who started producing Wyborowa in 1823 at Poznań. The implementation of new technologies in the latter half of the 19th century, which allowed the production of clear vodkas, contributed to their success. The first rectification distillery was established in 1871. In 1925, the production of clear vodkas was made a Polish government monopoly.

After World War II, all vodka distilleries were taken over by Poland's Marxist–Leninist government. During the martial law of the 1980s, the sale of vodka was rationed. Following the success of the Solidarity movement and the abolition of single-party rule in Poland, many distilleries began struggling financially. Some filed for bankruptcy, but many were privatized, leading to the creation of various new brands.

=== Russia ===
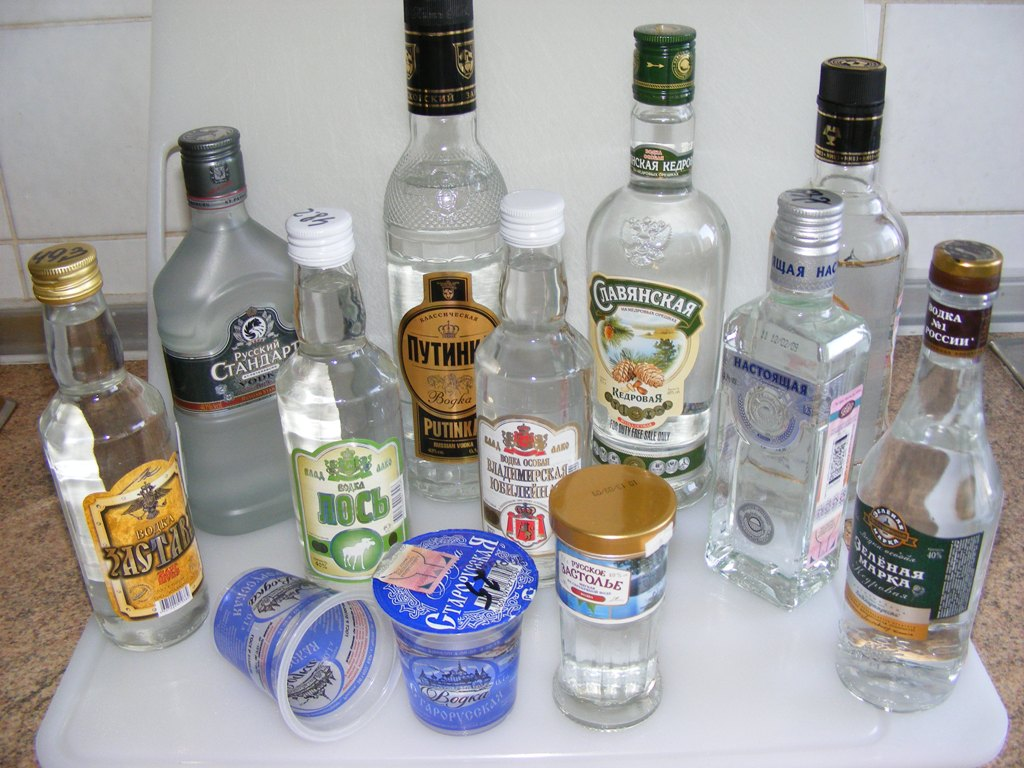
Russian vodka in various bottles and cups

==== Early history ====
A type of distilled liquor designated by the Russian word vodka came to Russia in the late 14th century. In 1386, the Genoese ambassadors brought the first aqua vitae ('water of life') to Moscow and presented it to Grand Prince Dmitry Donskoy. The liquid obtained by distillation of grape must was thought to be a concentrate and a spirit of wine (Latin: spiritus vini), whence came to the name of this substance in many European languages (like English spirit, or Russian спирт, spirt). As the Genoese passed through Moscow and brought with them aqua vitae, Russian monks transformed the practice of distilling wine into vodka production. Another theory is that the practice came to Russia through the trade routes of the Hanseatic League, with the earliest mention of imported wines being in 1436.

Perhaps one of the earliest terms linked to vodka production was varenoe vino ('distilled wine') which appears in a 1399 document. Another term used was perevara, a precursor to vodka, which last appears in official documents in 1495. The term korchma is one of the oldest official terms used for vodka, which was used alongside varenoe vino, but later came to denote illegally produced vodka by the 16th century. Other terms that referred to vodka included goriachee vino ('burning wine'), zhzhenoe vino ('burnt wine'), and khlebnoe vino ('bread wine').

This 'bread wine', as it was initially known, was for a long time produced exclusively in the Grand Principality of Moscow and nowhere else, a situation that persisted until the era of industrial production. As a result, the beverage was closely associated with Moscow. Ivan III established the first Russian state monopoly on vodka in 1474, and by 1505, distilled Russian vodka was being exported to Sweden.

By the 16th century, the consumption of vodka was widespread in Russia, with Sigismund von Herberstein stating that nobles at the Russian court "at the beginning of the meal always drank aqua vitae", although Herberstein makes no further mention of the drink. Around the same time, government-run taverns known as kabaks replaced privately-run korchmas. Giles Fletcher, who was the English ambassador in Russia, wrote:

In every great towne of his Realme he hath a Caback or drinking house, where is sold aquavitæ (which they call Russewine) mead, beere, &c. Out of these hee receiveth rent that amounteth to a great summe of money.

— Of the Russe Common Wealth (1591)

==== Russian Empire ====
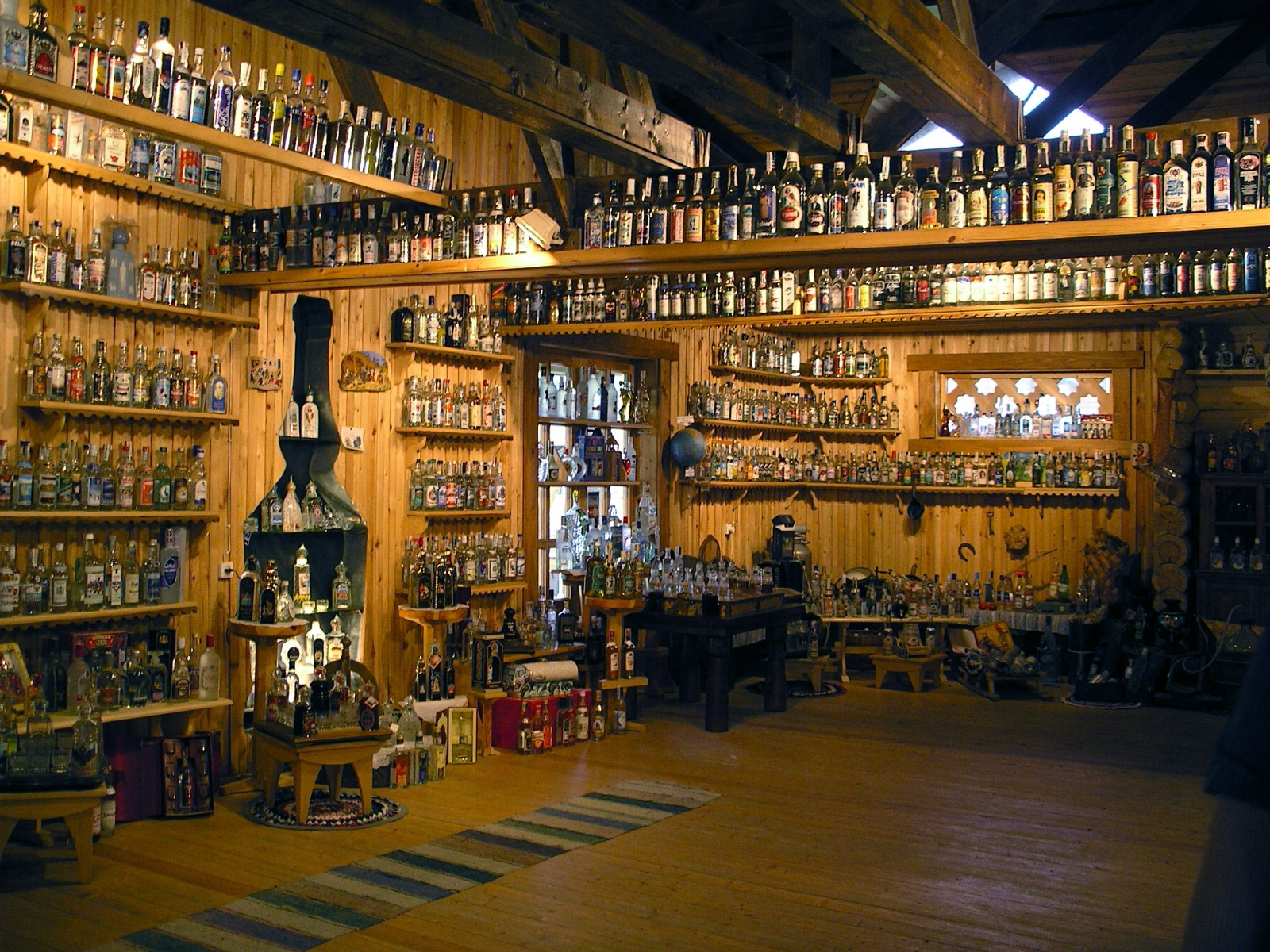
A Vodka museum in Russia, located in Verkhniye Mandrogi, Leningrad Oblast

The first written usage of the word vodka in an official Russian document in its modern meaning is dated by the decree of Empress Elizabeth of 8 June 1751, which regulated the ownership of vodka distilleries. By the 1860s, a government policy of promoting the consumption of state-manufactured vodka made it the drink of choice for many Russians. In 1863, the government monopoly on vodka production was repealed, causing prices to plummet and making vodka available even to low-income citizens. The taxes on vodka became a key element of government finances in Tsarist Russia, providing at times up to 40% of state revenue.

==== Post-Soviet Russia ====
Vodka remains a major source of state revenue and therefore of power. According to Mark Lawrence Schrad, a professor of political science, seizing control of the state spirits monopoly Rosspirtprom and its Kristall distillery was instrumental in Vladimir Putin consolidating his power as prime minister and president. During his tenure, the Putinka ('little Putin') brand of vodka became a bestseller, partly to Putin's financial benefit.

=== Sweden ===
From the 1960s, unflavoured Swedish brännvin also came to be called vodka. The first Swedish product to use this term was Explorer Vodka, which was created in 1958 and initially was intended for the American export market. Although it ultimately failed in that market, it remains one of the most popular vodka brands in Sweden today.

After Sweden joined the European Union in 1995, the regulations were changed so that privately owned companies could produce Vodka.

Vodka has become popular among young people, with a flourishing black market. In 2013, the organizers of the so-called "vodka car" were jailed for two and a half years for having illegally provided thousands of liters to young people, some as young as 13.

== Production ==
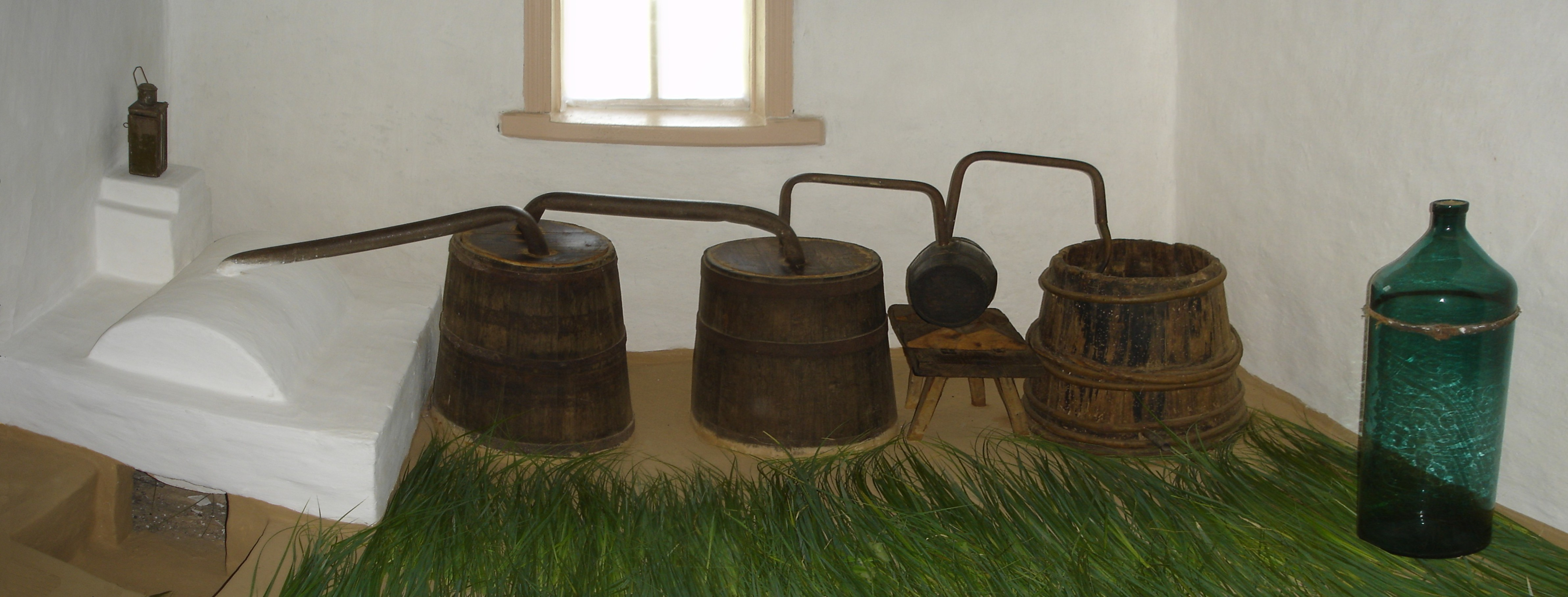
Historical vodka stills at the Museum of Folk Architecture & Life in Pereiaslav, Ukraine, 2007

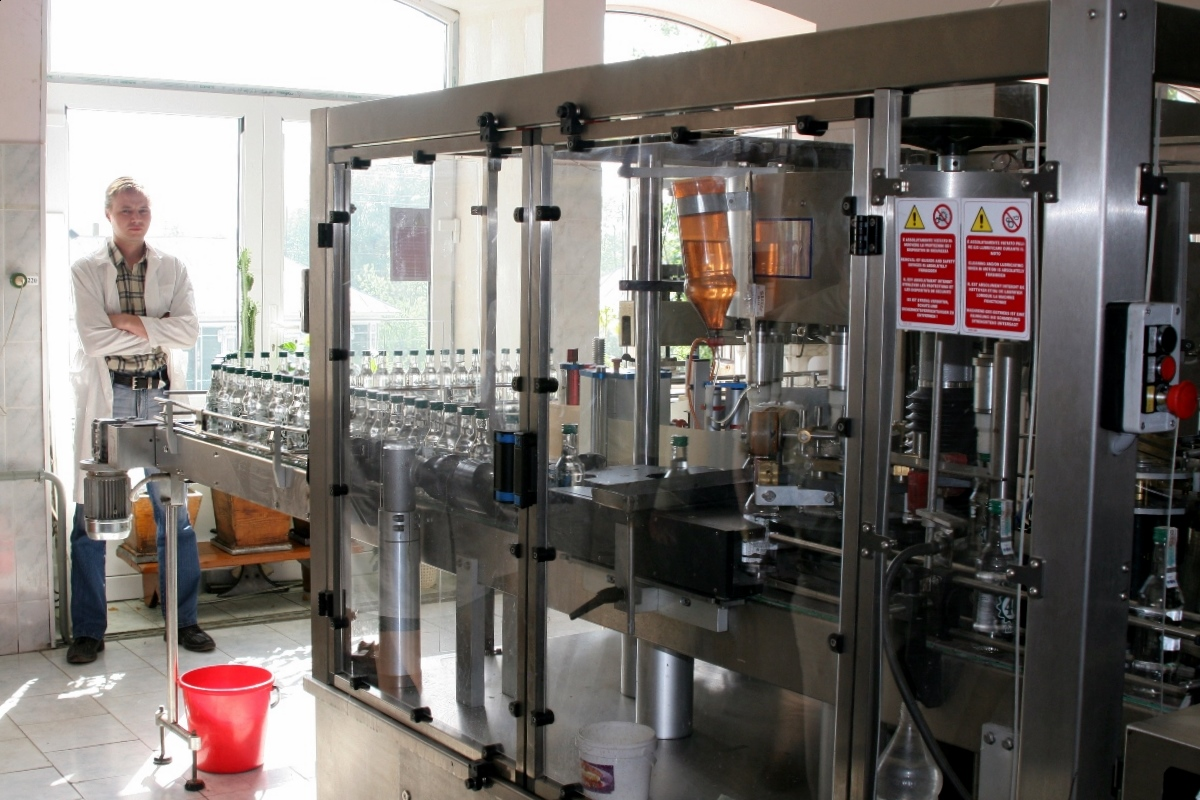
Vodka bottling machine, Shatskaya Vodka in Shatsk, Russia, 2005

Vodka may be distilled from any starch- or sugar-rich plant matter; most vodka today is produced from grains such as sorghum, corn, rye, or wheat. Some vodkas are made from potatoes, molasses, soybeans, grapes, rice, sugar beets and sometimes even byproducts of oil refining or wood pulp processing. In some Central European countries, such as Poland, some vodka is produced by just fermenting a solution of crystal sugar and yeast. In the European Union, there are talks about the standardization of vodka, and the Vodka Belt countries insist that only spirits produced from grains, potato, and sugar beet molasses be allowed to be branded as "vodka", following the traditional methods of production.

In the United States, many vodkas are made from 95% pure grain alcohol produced in large quantities by agricultural-industrial giants Archer Daniels Midland, Grain Processing Corporation, and Midwest Grain Products (MGP). Bottlers purchase the base spirits in bulk, then filter, dilute, distribute and market the end product under a variety of vodka brand names. Similar methods are used in other regions such as Europe.

A study conducted on NPR's Planet Money podcast revealed negligible differences in taste between various brands of vodka, leading to speculation as to how much branding contributes to the concept of "super-premium vodkas".

=== Flavoring ===
In Estonia vodkas are available with barberry, blackcurrant, cherry, green apple, lemon, vanilla, and watermelon flavors..

== 21st century ==
Vodka is less likely than other spirits to produce the undesirable aftereffects of heavy consumption (though no less likely to intoxicate) because of its low level of fusel oils and congeners, which are impurities that flavor spirits.

=== European Union regulation ===
The success of grape-based vodka in the United States in the early twenty-first century prompted traditional vodka producers in the Vodka Belt countries of Poland, Finland, Estonia, Lithuania, and Sweden to campaign for EU legislation that would define vodka as only spirits made from grain or potatoes. This proposition provoked heavy criticism from South European countries, which often distill used mash from wine-making into spirits; although higher-quality mash is usually distilled into some variety of pomace brandy, the lower-quality mash is better turned into neutral-flavored spirits instead. Any vodka not made from either grain or potatoes would have to display the products used in its production. This regulation entered into force in 2008.

=== Canadian regulations ===
Under Canadian regulations, vodka is a potable alcoholic distillate obtained from potatoes, cereal grain, or any other material of agricultural origin fermented by the action of yeast or a mixture of yeast and other microorganisms.

=== United States regulations ===
In 1956, it was put into revenue ruling that sugar not more than 0.2% and trace amounts of citric acid are not considered flavoring agents. The meaning of "trace amounts" of citric acid was clarified as not more than 1,000 ppm in 1995.

It is no longer defined as "to be without distinctive character, aroma, taste, or color." The law includes other requirements: Vodka cannot be aged in wood; it may or may not be charcoal filtered; and it must meet minimum distillation and bottling proofs.

== Boycotts ==
On September 1, 1983, a plane flying as KAL Flight 007 from Seoul to Anchorage, Alaska was shot down after briefly entering Soviet airspace. This led to a boycott of Russian vodka, particularly Stolichnaya.

In summer 2013, American LGBT rights activists targeted Russian vodka brands for boycott over Russia's anti-gay policies.

In late February 2022, with the Russian invasion of Ukraine, some North American liquor stores and bars expressed symbolic solidarity with Ukraine, and opposition to Russia, by boycotting Russian vodka brands.

== Illegal production ==
In some countries, black-market or bathtub vodka is widespread because it can be produced easily and avoids taxation. However, severe poisoning, blindness, or death can occur as a result of dangerous industrial ethanol substitutes being added by black-market producers. In March 2007, BBC News in a documentary sought to find the cause of severe jaundice among imbibers of a bathtub vodka in Russia.

== Public health effects ==
Estimates of the annual death toll resulting from vodka consumption extend up to the thousands in Russia.

== Cocktails ==
Vodka is among the most common alcoholic drinks used in cocktails, where it provides alcoholic strength while not obscuring the flavors of other ingredients. Well-known vodka cocktails include the screwdriver, the vodka Collins, and the Bloody Mary, with the first to gain prominence being the Moscow Mule in 1940s America. Vodka is particularly common among cocktails consumed with breakfast or brunch. Vodka cocktails are relatively uncommon in Slavic countries, where vodka is most often drunk neat.

== Cooking ==
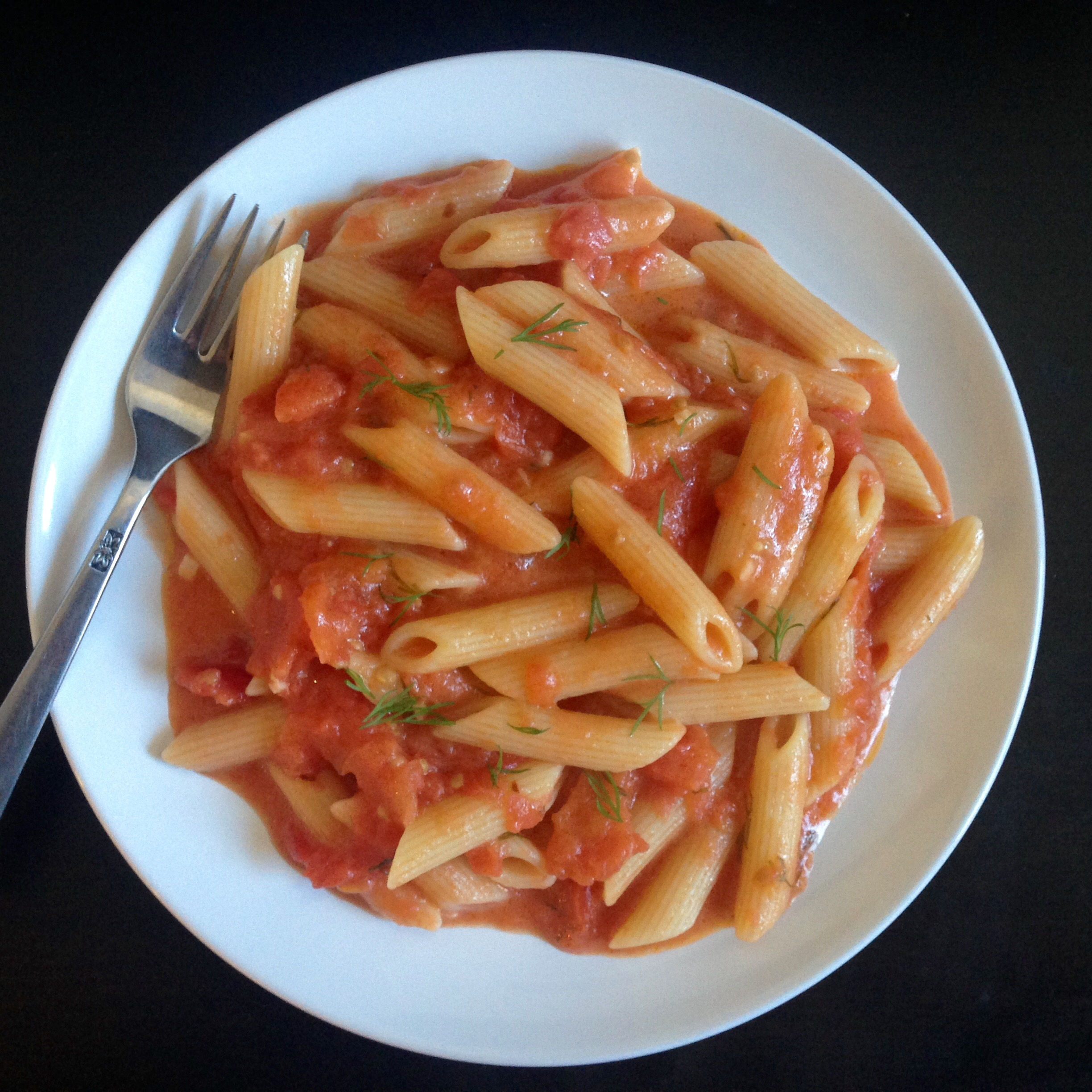
Penne alla vodka

Vodka can also be used in cooking and various recipes are improved by the addition of vodka or rely on it as a key ingredient. Vodka sauce is a pasta sauce made from tomato sauce, cream, and vodka that gained popularity in the 1970s. Vodka can be used in baking as a substitute for water: pie crusts can be made flakier with vodka. It may be used in seafood dishes, cheesecake, or bitters.

== See also ==
- List of cocktails with vodka
- List of vodkas
- Vodka war

== Sources ==
- Ayto, John (18 October 2012). "Vodka". The Diner's Dictionary: Word Origins of Food and Drink. OUP Oxford. doi:10.1093/acref/9780199640249.001.0001. ISBN 978-0-19-964024-9.
- Carlin, Joseph M (2012). Cocktails: A Global History. London: Reaktion Books. ISBN 978-1-78023-024-5.
- DeSalle, Rob; Tattersall, Ian (12 July 2022). Distilled: A Natural History of Spirits. Yale University Press. ISBN 978-0-300-26510-1.
- Goldstein, Darra (24 May 2022). The Kingdom of Rye: A Brief History of Russian Food. University of California Press. ISBN 978-0-520-38389-0.
- Herlihy, Patricia (2012). Vodka: A Global History. Reaktion Books. ISBN 9781861899293.
- Pokhlyobkin, William (17 December 1992). A History of Vodka. Verso. ISBN 978-0-86091-359-7.
- Sawyer, Stephen W. (2025). What We Eat: A Global History of Food. Columbia University Press. pp. 321–323. ISBN 978-0-231-21368-4.
- Schrad, Mark (March 2014). Vodka Politics: Alcohol, Autocracy, and the Secret History of the Russian State. OUP USA. pp. 79–83. ISBN 978-0-19-975559-2.
- Schrad, Mark L. (14 October 2021). "Vodka". In Rothbaum, Noah (ed.). The Oxford Companion to Spirits and Cocktails. Oxford University Press. pp. 755–759. ISBN 978-0-19-067040-5.
- Simpson, Scott (1 January 2010). "History and Mythology of Polish Vodka: 1270-2007". Food & History. 8 (1): 121–148. doi:10.1484/J.FOOD.1.100976. ISSN 1780-3187.
- Smith, Andrew F (2013). Food and Drink in American History. Santa Barbara, California: ABC-CLIO. ISBN 978-1-61069-233-5.
