= Jonathan Clarke (silversmith) =

American silversmith (1705–1770)

- Born: August 12, 1705; Newport, Rhode Island, U.S.
- Died: 1770 (aged 64–65)
- Occupation: Silversmith

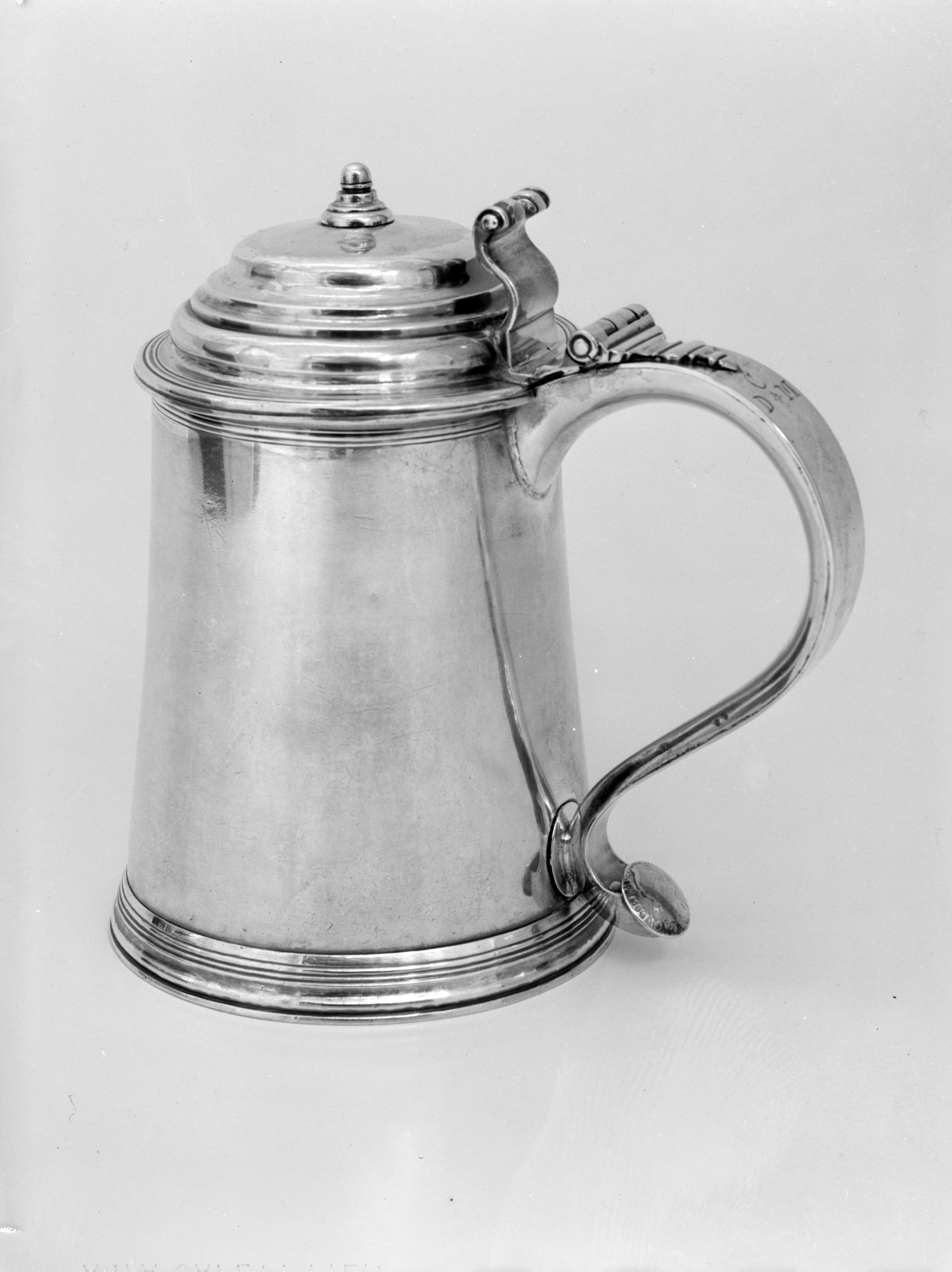
Tankard by Jonathan Clarke, 1735–45, in the Metropolitan Museum of Art

Jonathan Clarke (August 12, 1705 - 1770) was an American silversmith active in Newport and Providence, Rhode Island.

Clarke was born in Newport, Rhode Island, where from 1734 to 1755 he worked as a silversmith. There he served in the militia as Ensign in 1735 and Captain in 1742, and in 1750 was appointed Justice of Peace. From about 1755-1766 he was active as a silversmith in Providence, Rhode Island. His work is collected in the Metropolitan Museum of Art, Rhode Island School of Design Museum, Winterthur Museum, and Yale University Art Gallery.
