= Antoine Terrasson =

French author

- Born: 1 November 1705; Paris, France
- Died: 30 October 1782 (aged 76); France
- Occupation: Writer
- Notable work: Histoire de la jurisprudence romaine (1750); Mélanges d'histoire, de littérature, de jurisprudence littéraire (1768)

Antoine Terrasson (1 November 1705 in Paris – 30 October 1782) was an 18th-century French writer.

== Publications ==
- 1741: Dissertation historique sur la vielle
- 1750: Histoire de la jurisprudence romaine, Lyon and Paris
- 1762: Histoire de l'emplacement de l'ancien hôtel de Soissons, Paris, Ve Simon, in-4° et Paris, Imp. Lottin Aîné
- 1768: Mélanges d'histoire, de littérature, de jurisprudence littéraire
- 1772: Réfutation d'un Mémoire prétendu historique et critique, in-4°
- Addition à la réfutation du mémoire prétendu historique et critique, sur la topographie de Paris, donné par l'historiographe de la ville
