= Georg Wolfgang Knorr =

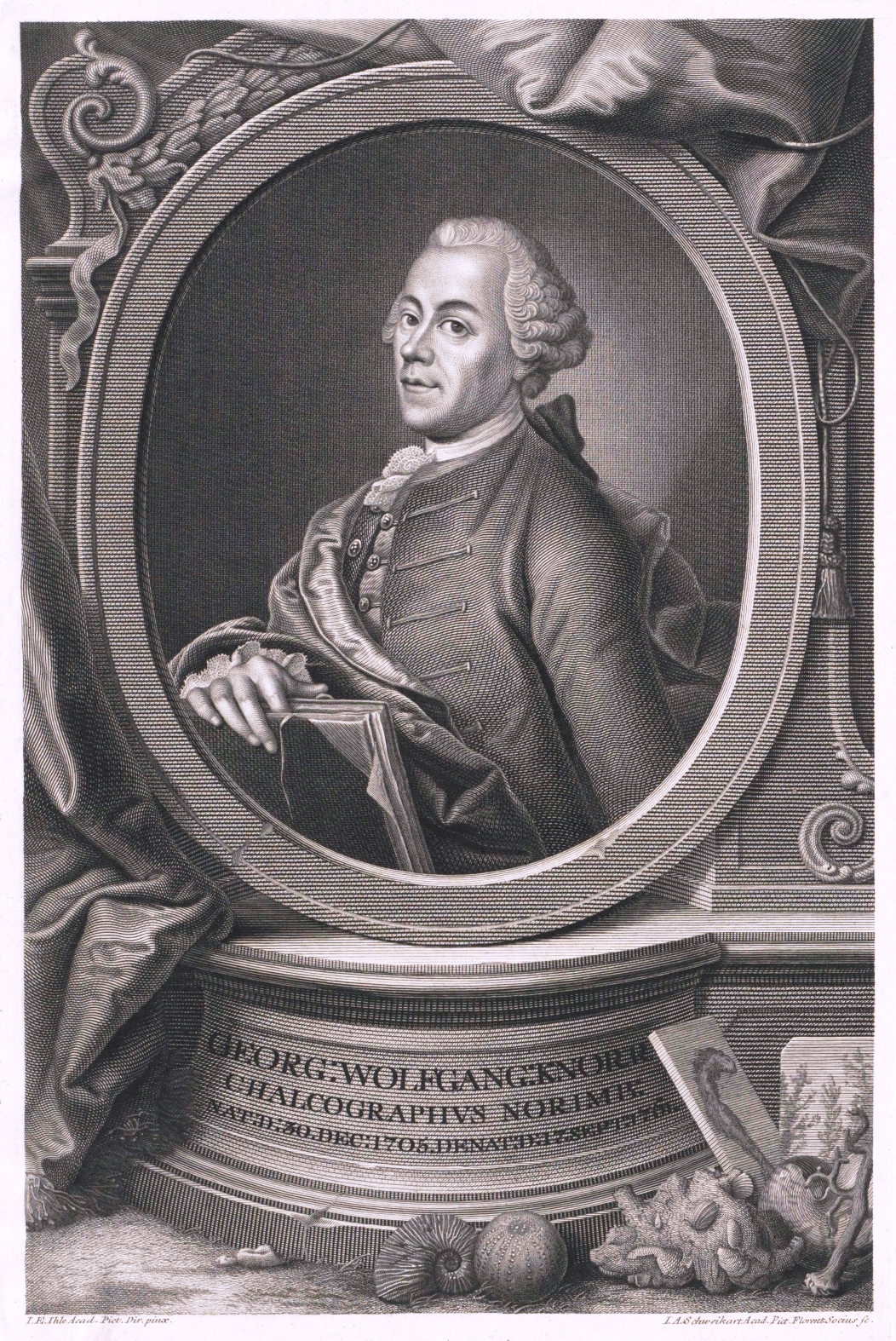
Georg Wolfgang Knorr

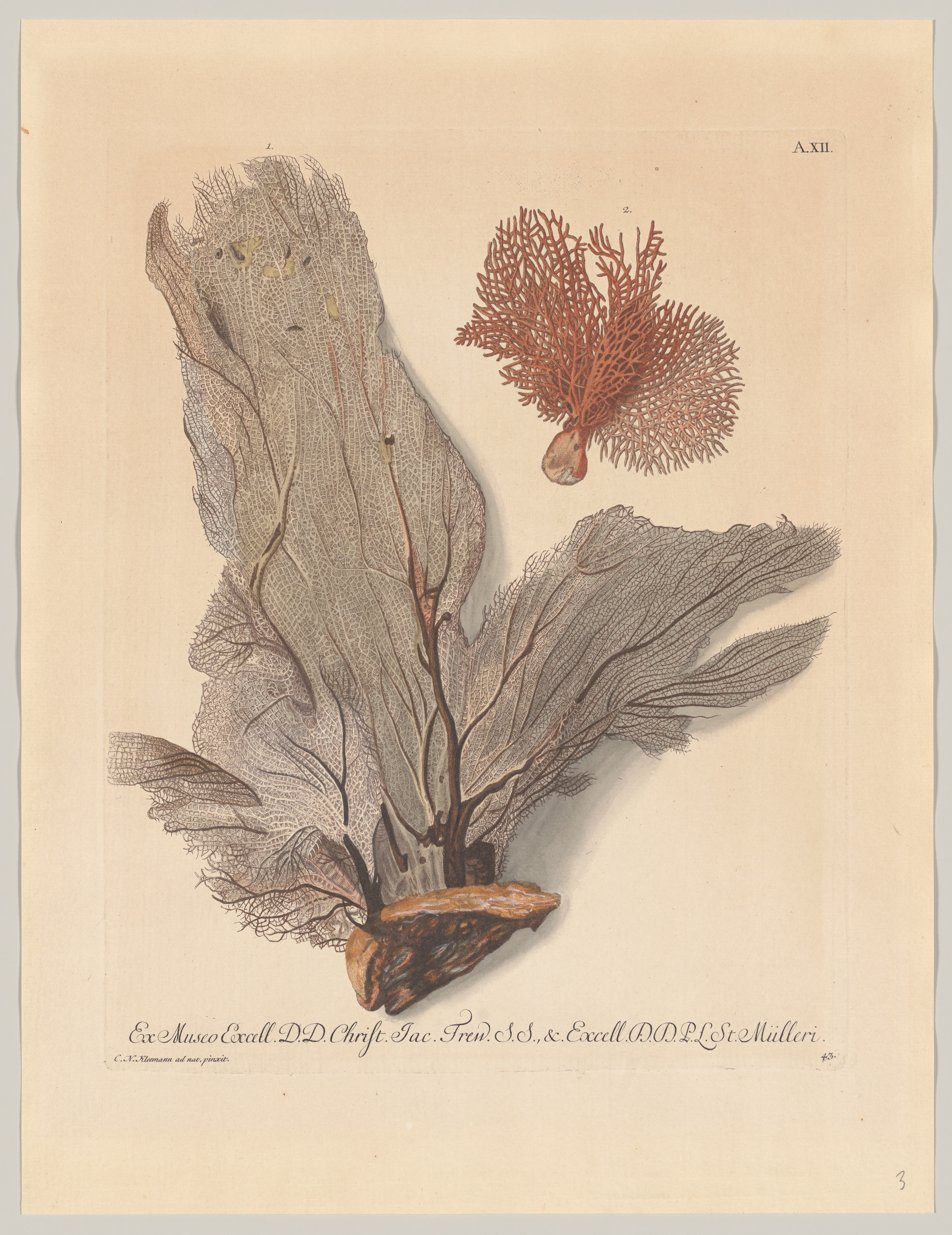
Plate XII from "Deliciae Naturae Selectae" (1751–67)

Georg Wolfgang Knorr (30 December 1705, in Nürnberg – 17 September 1761, in Nürnberg) was a German engraver and naturalist.

== Works ==
- Deliciae Naturae Selectae Oder Auserlesenes Naturalien Cabinet (1766–67)
- Les Délices Des Yeux et de L'espirit, ou Collection Generale des Differentes Espèces de Coquillages (1764–73).
- Sammlung von Merckwürdigkeiten der Natur und Alterthümern des Erdbodens welche petrificirte Cörper enthält aufgewiesen und beschrieben A. Bieling, Nürnberg, 1755
