= Wyborowa =

Brand of Polish vodka

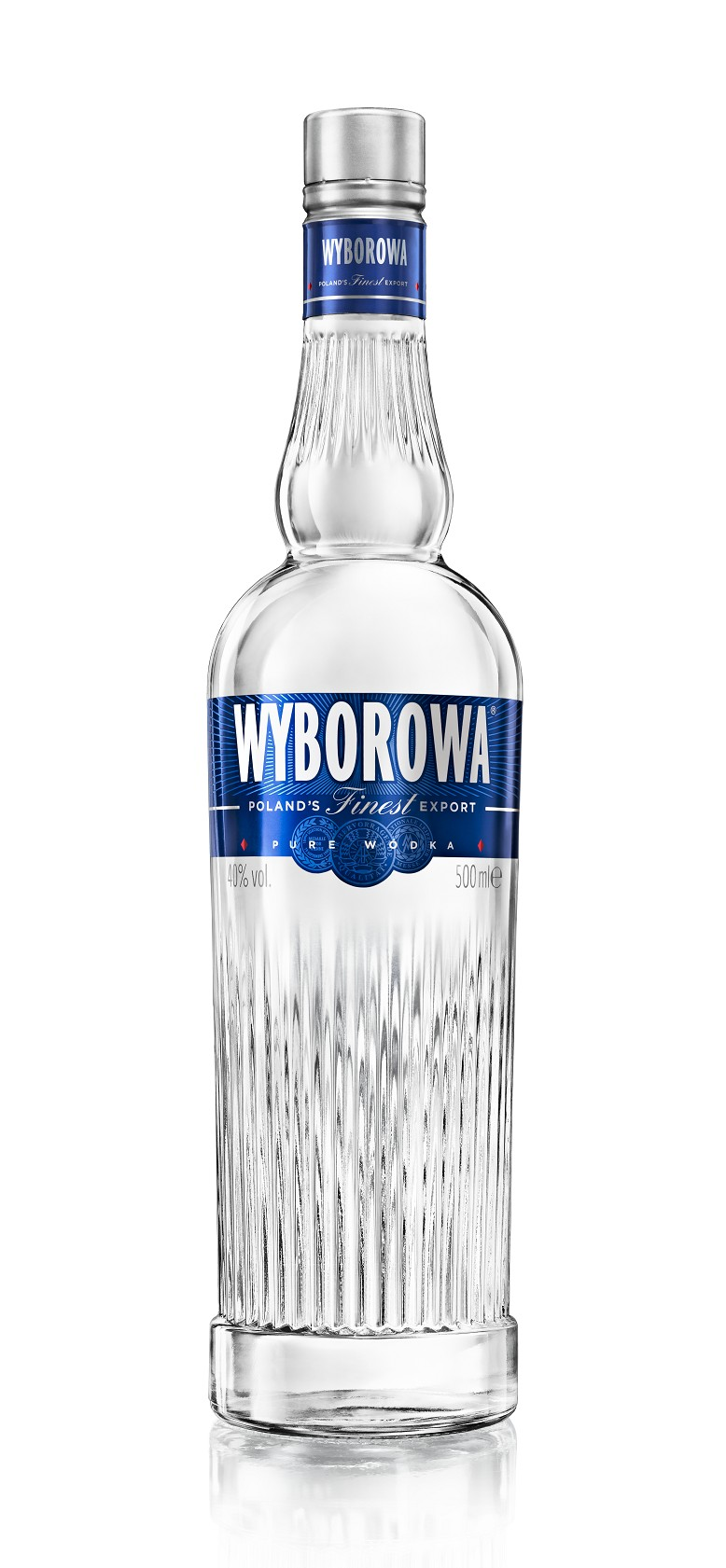
- Type: Vodka
- Manufacturer: WYBOROWA S.A.
- Origin: Poznań, Poland
- Introduced: 1823
- Alcohol by volume: 40%
- Proof (US): 80
- Website: wyborowa.pl

Wyborowa (the feminine of the Polish adjective wyborowy 'fine') or Wódka Wyborowa is a brand of Polish vodka. The adjective was used in a favorable press article and then added after the word wódka 'vodka', resulting in the final name Wódka Wyborowa.

The product remained popular domestically until 1873 when the export of the vodka was started to the European countries. In 1927, Wyborowa became the first vodka brand to be an international trademark. In the 1950s and 60s, Wyborowa conquered all major European countries - it constituted over 60% of the total volume of vodka exported to the United Kingdom.

After the period of economic transition in the late 1980s and early 90s, the Poznań distillery, like many others in the country, got itself into serious trouble and was close to filing for bankruptcy protection. However, due to the large international popularity of its major product, the plant was bought by the French alcohol producer Pernod Ricard.

Until 2009, Wyborowa was presented in 29 international competitions bringing - together with Wyborowa Exquisite (formerly Single Estate) in the Super Premium category - 29 medals including 22 gold. In addition, Wódka Wyborowa received the International High Quality Trophy at Monde Selection's World Quality Selections in 2012.

In 2017 Wyborowa introduced new series of products including Wyborowa od Mistrza and Dark - first black vodka.

== Production process ==
Wyborowa is produced from rye grain, using a double-step distillation process. The rye is sent to small privately owned agricultural distilleries, where the rye is mashed and distilled once to produce "raw spirit". When the rye arrives at the agricultural distillery, it is ground and then cooked within a large vessel using heated water from the distillery's own source. The mixture is treated with enzymes that facilitate the hydrolysis of starch to glucose. Afterwards, it undergoes fermentation in stainless steel tanks. Once the fermentation has been completed, the resulting liquid is known as the ‘wash’ and has an alcoholic strength of between 7% and 11% ABV. The wash is distilled in a copper column still, yielding a spirit around 90% ABV. It takes 3 kg of rye to produce one litre of spirit. This "raw spirit" is then transferred to the rectification plant for further purification.

The raw spirit passes through three columns of a continuous still to remove impurities. Before Wyborowa is bottled, the rectified spirit needs to be reduced to the bottling strength of 40% ABV by diluting it with water from a dedicated spring. Once diluted, the vodka is passed through natural cellulose plates and mesh filters to remove particulate matter. Filtered vodka is pumped to the bottling line, where 5,000 bottles of Wyborowa are filled per hour.

The unique bottle shape was designed by architect Frank Gehry.

== Criticism ==
In an analysis mandated by Swiss TV RTS in May 2014, the Eurofins Scientific group of laboratories reveals the presence of sugar cane or corn while Wyborowa's labeling mentions rye alcohol only.

== See also ==
- List of cocktails
- Alcoholic beverage
