= Horst Schnellhardt =

German politician (born 1946)

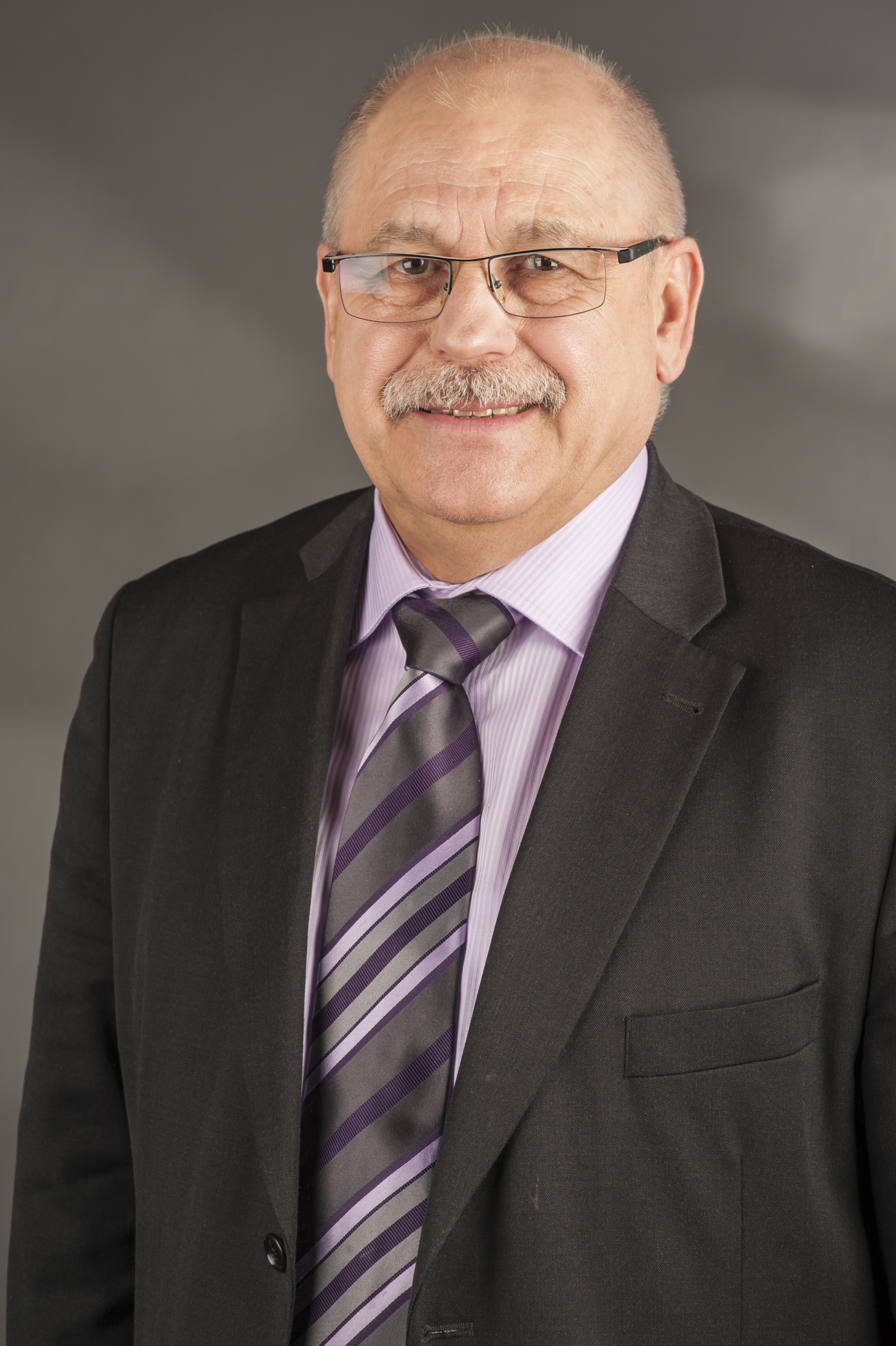
Horst Schnellhardt in 2014

Horst Schnellhardt (born 12 May 1946) is a German politician who served as a Member of the European Parliament from 1994 until 2009, representing Saxony-Anhalt. He is a member of the conservative Christian Democratic Union, part of the European People's Party.

He is the author and the namesake of the "Schnellhardt compromise" aimed at the defusing of the "vodka war".
