= Jan Paweł Biretowski =

Jan Paweł Biretowski (9 June 1705 – 13 September 1781) was a Polish baroque scholar and publisher of a self-help book bearing a paragraph-long title translated as the Interesting News, Important to Everyone, About the Power of all Grain, Vegetables and Various Herbs both Domestic and Wild, What Results and Benefits they Bring to Man in Various Circumstances; How Unique They Are for Preservation of the Man's Well-being, Written By Serious Scholars thus Collected and Printed in 1769 in Łowicz on the orders of Jan Zamoyski the Ordinate and Voivode of Podolia, and Reprinted in 1772 by Paweł Jan Biretowski.

The book title reads in the Old Polish: Wiadomosc Ciekawa, Każdemu wielce potrzebna, O Skutkach Y Mocy Zboż wszelkich, iarzyn y zioł rożnych, tak ogrodowych, iako y polnych, Iakie Skutki y pożytki przynoszą Człowiekowi w rożnych okolicznościach, osobliwie na poratowanie zdrowia Ludzkiego Słuząca, : Z Powaznych Autorow Dla wygody Ludzkiey krotko Zebrana, nayprzod Roku [...] 1769 w Łowiczu wydrukowana, a teraz z rozkazu [...] Jana Ordynata Zamoyskiego Woiewody Podolskiego [...] Przedrukowana Roku [...] 1772. The book, signed by Paweł Jan Biretowski, is available through specialized libraries worldwide.
