= List of vodka brands =

This is a list of vodka brands. Vodka is a distilled beverage composed primarily of water and ethanol, sometimes with traces of impurities and flavorings. Vodka is made by the distillation of fermented substances such as grains, potatoes, or sometimes fruits or sugar. The classic preparation is performed using grain or potatoes. The grains or potatoes based vodka has a neutral flavor profile.

Brand	Country / Region	Base
Billson's	Australia	GE-free whey
Vodka O	Australia	GE-free whey
Monopolowa	Austria (originally Polish)	Potatoes
Belaya Rus	Belarus	Winter wheat and rye
Kryshtal Etalon	Belarus	Wheat and rye
Minsk Kristall	Belarus	Grain
Platinka	Belarus	Rye
Crystal Head	Canada	Peaches and Cream corn
Pearl	Canada	Wheat
Polar Ice	Canada	Canadian corn
Schramm Organic	Canada	Pemberton Potatoes
Zirkova	Canada	Wheat and rye spirits
Danzka	Denmark	Wheat
Frïs	Denmark	Wheat
Blue Diamond	Estonia	Rye
Kihnu Mark	Estonia	
Viru Valge	Estonia	Grain
Finlandia	Finland	Barley
Koskenkorva	Finland	Barley
Kors Vodka	Finland	Grain
Ström	Finland	Grain and potatoes
Cîroc	France	Mauzac Blanc and Ugni Blanc grapes
Dragon Bleu	France	Wheat, barley, rye
Eristoff	France	Grain ("Pure Grain")
Grey Goose	France	Wheat
Jean-Marc XO	France	Wheat
Mariette	France	Wheat
Kleiner Feigling	Germany	Fig
Magic Spirits	Germany	Grain
Rachmaninoff	Germany	
Wodka Gorbatschow	Germany	
Zaranoff	Germany	
Royal Dragon	Hong Kong	Winter rye
Reyka	Iceland	Grain
Magic Moments	India	Grain
Romanov	India	Grain
White Mischief	India	
L'Chaim	Israel	Corn
VKA Vodka	Italy	Organic wheat and spelt
Roberto Cavalli	Italy	Grapes/Blended
Haku	Japan	Rice
Kissui	Japan	Rice
Clique	Latvia	
Latvijas Balzams	Latvia	
Stumbras	Lithuania	
Oso Negro	Mexico	
Villa Lobos	Mexico	
Chinggis	Mongolia	
Bols	Netherlands	Rye
Bong Spirit	Netherlands	Wheat
Hooghoudt	Netherlands	
Ketel One	Netherlands	Wheat
Ursus	Netherlands	
Vox	Netherlands	Wheat
42 Below	New Zealand	GE-free wheat
Vikingfjord	Norway	Potato
Murree's Vodka	Pakistan	
Bolskaya	Pakistan	
Absolwent	Poland	Grain
Belvedere	Poland	Rye
Biała Dama	Poland	Rye
Chopin	Poland	Potato, Rye or Wheat
Ck Vodka	Poland	Grain
Cracovia	Poland	Potato
Krupnik	Poland	Grain and honey
Luksusowa	Poland	Potato
Łańcut	Poland	Grain
Polonaise	Poland	Grain
Siwucha	Poland	Grain
Sobieski	Poland	Rye
Soplica	Poland	Grain, with fruit and nuts in nalewka variants
Starka	Poland and Lithuania	Rye
Ultimat	Poland	Potato, wheat and rye
Wisent	Poland	Rye
Wyborowa	Poland	Rye
Żołądkowa Gorzka	Poland	27 herbs and fruits
Żubrówka	Poland	Rye
Gold Symphony (Золотая симфония)	Russia	
Hrenovuha (Хреновуха)	Russia	Horseradish
Kauffman (Кауфман)	Russia	Wheat
Kizlyarka (Кизлярка)	Russia	Grape must
Kubanskaya (Кубанская)	Russia	
Moskovskaya (Московская)	Russia and Latvia	Wheat and rye
Narodnaya (Народная)	Russia	
Putinka (Путинка)	Russia	
Pyatizvyozdnaya (Пятизвёздная)	Russia	
Rodnik (Родник)	Russia	
Ruskova (Рускова)	Russia	
Russian Standard (Русский стандарт)	Russia	Winter grains
Shustov (Шустов)	Russia	Wheat
Stolichnaya (Столичная)	Russia and Latvia	Wheat and rye
Stolnaya (Стольная)	Russia	Wheat
Youri Dolgoruki (Юрий Долгорукий)	Russia	Wheat
Double Cross	Slovakia	Wheat
V44	Slovakia	Wheat
Absolut	Sweden	Winter wheat
Explorer	Sweden	Wheat
Karlsson's	Sweden	Potato
Level	Sweden	Wheat
Pinky Vodka	Sweden	
Purity Vodka	Sweden	Wheat, barley
Renat vodka	Sweden	Wheat
Xellent Swiss	Switzerland	Rye
Khlibnyi Dar (Хлібний Дар)	Ukraine	Cereal grains
Khortytsia (Хортиця)	Ukraine	Wheat and corn
Nemiroff (Неміроф)	Ukraine	Wheat
Adnams	United Kingdom	Barley, wheat and oats
Black Cow	United Kingdom	Milk
Chase	United Kingdom	Potato
Glen's	United Kingdom	Sugar beet
Isensua	United Kingdom	Grain
Smirnoff	United Kingdom owned (originally Russian, produced worldwide)	Grain
Vladivar	United Kingdom	Grain
Anestasia Vodka	United States	Sweet corn
Bowman's	United States	Grain
Boyd & Blair	United States	Potato
Cirrus	United States	Potato
Dubra	United States	
Firefly	United States	Muscadines
Fleischmann's	United States	Grain
Grand Teton	United States	Potato
Hangar 1	United States	Viognier grapes and wheat
Leopold Bros.	United States	
Lotus	United States	Wheat
New Amsterdam	United States	Grain
Nikolai	United States	Corn
Orloff	United States	Grains
Pinnacle	United States (originally French)	Wheat
Popov	United States	Grain
Rain	United States	White corn
SAVVY Vodka	United States	Grain
SKYY	United States	Grain
Square One Organic	United States	Organic rye
Sazerac Company	United States	
Svedka	United States	Corn
Tito's	United States	Yellow corn
Three Olives	United States (originally British)	Grain
UV	United States	Corn
VÄD	United States	
Vodka 14	United States	Organic corn and rye

== See also ==
- List of gin brands
- List of rum brands
- List of tequilas
- List of whisky brands
