= Dubra =

Dubra may refer to:

== Places ==
- Dubra (town), Ethiopia
- Dubra, Purulia, West Bengal, India, a census town and gram panchayat
- Iri-ye Sofla, Iran, a village also known as Dubra

== Other uses ==
- Kaspars Dubra (born 1990), Latvian footballer
- Rihards Dubra (born 1964), Latvian composer
- Dubra (vodka), a brand of vodka
