= Grand Teton Vodka =

American vodka

- Type: Vodka
- Manufacturer: Grand Teton Distillery
- Origin: Idaho, United States
- Introduced: 2012
- Related products: List of vodkas
- Website: www.tetonvodka.com

Grand Teton Vodka is a craft spirit distilled from Idaho potatoes.

== Production ==
Grand Teton Vodka is made from 100% Idaho potatoes and water drawn from the Snake River watershed of the Teton Mountain Range. It is fermented through a proprietary process. Following fermentation, it undergoes a single pass through a pot and column still and then filtered with charcoal and garnet crystal. Production takes place in small batches at Grand Teton Distillery, located in Driggs, Idaho near the water source.

== History ==
Lea Beckett formed Grand Teton Vodka, Inc, in Driggs, Idaho to launch Grand Teton Vodka in August, 2012. John Boczar is the head distiller in charge of all production operations at Grand Teton Distillery. As of early 2013 the vodka had distribution in seven states.

== Reviews ==
In October 2012, Grand Teton Potato Vodka received a Gold Medal with a rating of 94 points (Exceptional) from the Beverage Testing Institute, which noted its "Clear. Bright aromas and flavors of nougat, custard, and pound cake with a silky, dryish medium body and a super smooth, dried fruit and delicate spice and mineral finish."

In April 2013 the San Francisco World Spirits Competition awarded Grand Teton Potato Vodka a Double Gold Medal, which is only achieved if all judges unanimously rank the spirit at Gold level quality.

Proof66's aggregate rating, which incorporates these scores and others, ranks the spirit as the #1 potato vodka among all rated potato vodkas.

Proof66's aggregate rating ranks the spirit as the #3 vodka among all types of vodka. There are currently over 1,400 different vodkas ranked in the Proof66 database.
