= Square One Organic Vodka =

Organic rye vodka brand

- Type: Vodka
- Manufacturer: Distilled Resources
- Origin: United States
- Introduced: 2006
- Related products: Vodka 14 (Rigby, Idaho); Pemberton Distillery (British Columbia); Snow Queen Vodka (Kazakhstan)
- Website: https://squareoneorganicspirits.com/

Square One Organic Vodka is a spirit distilled from organically grown rye.

== History ==
Allison Evanow formed Square One Organic Spirits, LLC, in Novato, California to launch Square One Organic Vodka in April, 2006.

In 2019, Square One released a line of organic mixers, and it 2020 they released a line of organic canned cocktails.

in 2024, It was announced that Square One Organic Spirits, LLC was acquired by Uncle Nearest.

== Production ==
Square One Organic Vodka is made from organic American-grown rye, and with water drawn from the Snake River which runs underneath the distillery. The facility gets 25% of its electricity from a local wind farm through renewable energy credits.

== Reviews ==
Remarking on the nature of organic and environmentally conscious alcohol brands, including Square One, one reviewer/bar owner wrote "Alcohol is still alcohol, you’re not getting a better buzz or less of a hangover. The point is [...] doing things differently."

== See also ==
- List of vodkas
