= Boyd & Blair =

American vodka brand

Boyd & Blair Potato Vodka
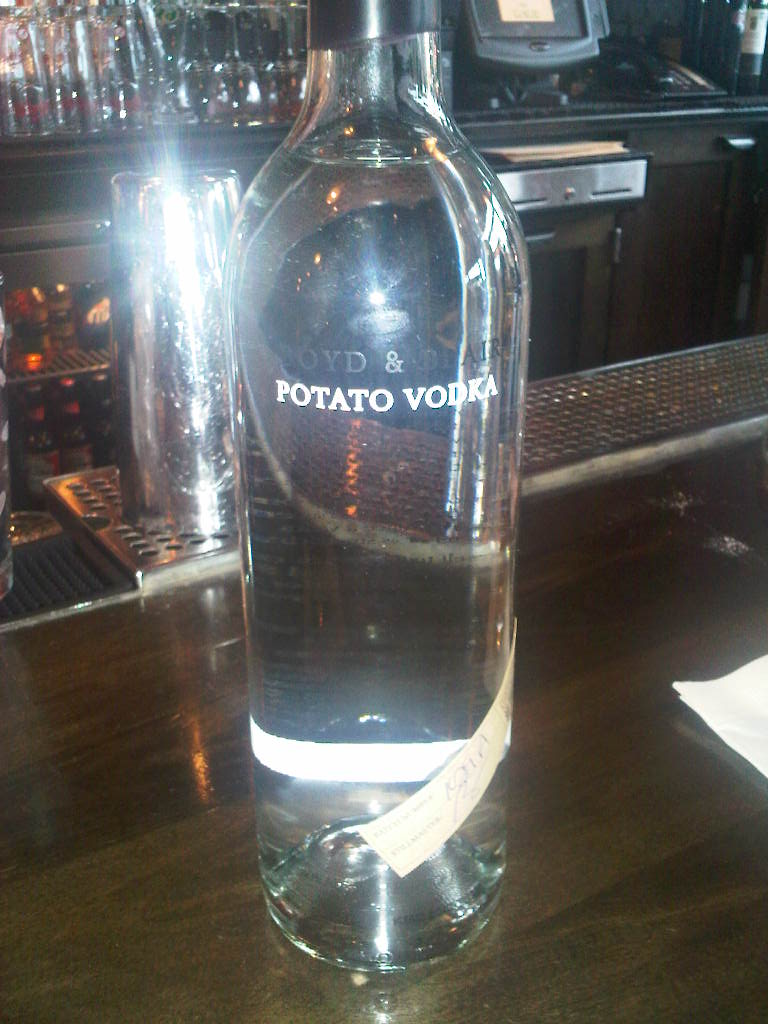
- Type: Vodka
- Manufacturer: Pennsylvania Pure Distilleries LLC
- Origin: Glenshaw, Pennsylvania, United States
- Introduced: 2010 in United States
- Alcohol by volume: 80 Proof / 40 % ALC
- Proof (US): 80
- Related products: List of vodkas American made Distilled Spirits Vodka Liquor

Boyd & Blair Potato Vodka is a brand of American made vodka distilled in Glenshaw, Pennsylvania, by Pennsylvania Pure Distilleries, LLC. This small-batch, award winning vodka is made from Pennsylvania potatoes using a "think-local" philosophy. The potatoes used are grown in Pennsylvania's Somerset, Butler, and Schuylkill Counties. The distillery is located in the former Glenshaw Glass works in Shaler Township, Pennsylvania

The company was started by two men: Prentiss Orr was a marketing consultant who worked for the South Side's Outlook Advertising Agency and previously served as vice president of the Greater Pittsburgh Area Chamber of Commerce; Barry Young was a former president and CEO of RX Partners, an affiliate of the University of Pittsburgh Medical Center Health System. Orr is chairman and Young is president and CEO. They were inspired by the micro-brew phase of the 1990s after Young had visited the Jack Daniels Distillery.

The beginning of the company began in 2005 when Orr and Young first discussed the idea of opening a distillery. The company, Pennsylvania Pure Distilleries, LLC, got started with $1 million in private investment and a $165,000 state grant from the First Industries Fund through the Pennsylvania Department of Community and Economic Development.

The 2008 Pittsburgh Whiskey and Fine Spirits Festival played a large role in attracting early buzz. It was recognized by GQ magazine in 2011.

By 2010 it was available in Ohio, New York, Connecticut, Rhode Island, Illinois, and California. In 2011, Pennsylvania Pure Distilleries struck a deal with The Country Vintner to distribute Boyd & Blair in Delaware, Maryland, West Virginia, North Carolina, the District of Columbia and Florida. In March 2012, a deal was struck with Pennsylvania Liquor Control Board to make it available in Pennsylvania state liquor stores.

In June 2011, Spirit Journal ranked Boyd & Blair the 22nd-ranked liquor on the planet and the highest-ranked vodka on the list. The acclaim was noted by GrubStreet/New York (magazine). In 2017, Boyd & Blair was awarded another 95 Rating By F. Paul Pacault's "Spirit Journal," as well as a Tried & True award among others. Boyd & Blair has received acclaim in Food Network Magazine, Saveur Magazine, Details Magazine, Food & Wine Magazine, and the Wall Street Journal. In March 2012, the specialty version of Boyd & Blair, 151 Professional Proof, was given 5 Stars/Highest Recommendation by Spirit Journal.
