= Narodny =

Narodny (masculine), Narodnaya (feminine), or Narodnoye (neuter) may refer to:

- Narodny Municipal Okrug, a municipal okrug of Nevsky District of the federal city of St. Petersburg, Russia
- Moscow Narodny Bank
- Mount Narodnaya, the highest peak of the Ural Mountains, Russia
- Narodnaya, a brand of Russian vodka
- Narodnoye, a rural locality (a selo) in Ternovsky District of Voronezh Oblast, Russia

== See also ==
- Narodnoye Pravo
- Narodnoye Slovo
- Narodnaya Volya (disambiguation)
- Narodnaya Gazeta
