= Khortytsia (company) =

Ukrainian alcohol company

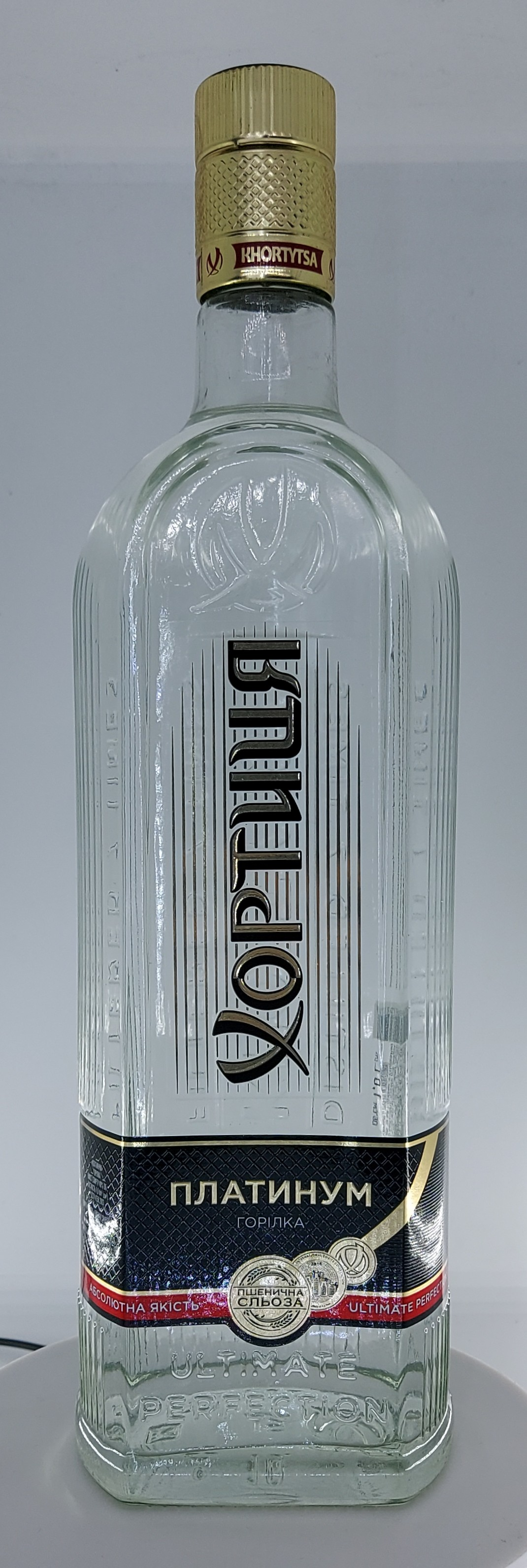
- Native name: Хортиця
- Industry: Food and Drink
- Founded: (2003)
- Headquarters: Zaporizhzhia, Zaporizhzhia Oblast, Ukraine
- Products: Horilka, Vodka, Alcoholic beverages
- Number of employees: 1,600
- Website: khortytsa.com khor.com

Khortytsia or Khortytsa (Ukrainian: Хортиця, pronounced [ˈxɔrtɪtsʲɐ]) is a Ukrainian vodka produced at the Khortytsa Distillery in Zaporizhzhia and owned by the Kyiv-based alcohol holding Global Spirits. . Khortytsia markets vodka in the United States under the brand name Khor.

The label is named after Khortytsia Island on the Dnipro River, a national landmark often referred to as “the heart of Ukraine.”

== History ==
Entrepreneur Yevhen Chernyak founded a distribution company in 1998 and began building a new high-tech distillery in 2002; the first Khortytsia bottles rolled off the line in December 2003, exactly one year after construction began. Large-scale exports started in 2006, and by 2011 the brand had entered the United States, where it is sold as Khor. By 2013 Khortytsia products were available in more than eighty countries.

== Production and technology ==
The distillery, one of the ten largest vodka plants in the world, combines continuous column distillation of 100 % grain neutral spirit with artesian spring water sourced on-site. Vodka leaves the plant after a seven-stage filtration sequence that includes quartz sand, birch-and-alder charcoal and schungite mineral filters.

== Product portfolio ==
Khortytsia’s core line is headed by Platinum, followed by premium extensions such as De Luxe and Ice, the latter sold in a temperature-sensitive bottle that turns blue below 5 °C. Flavoured variants—including honey-pepper and birch bud infusions—are released periodically for CIS and export markets.

== Global expansion ==
Between 2012 and 2016 Global Spirits grew Khor’s United States footprint from ten to twenty-two states, generating a 300 % jump in American sales and prompting a restructuring of its stateside sales force.

== Market performance ==
Drinks International tracked a rivalry for third place in global vodka sales between Khortytsia and fellow Ukrainian brand Khlibnyi Dar; in 2015 Khortytsia pulled ahead after posting 3 % volume growth to 7.5 million nine-litre cases. The Spirits Business reported that the label ranked among the world’s top three best-selling vodkas in the 2017 edition of its “Millionaires’ Club” survey. Recent data show Khortytsia shipping 9.3 million cases in 2023, edging closer to Pernod Ricard’s Absolut.

== Recent developments ==
The 2022 Russian invasion of Ukraine has repeatedly disrupted industrial activity in Zaporizhzhia. In June 2025 regional authorities reported that a missile strike damaged an unnamed production facility in the city, underscoring the vulnerability of enterprises such as the Khortytsa plant situated within artillery range. Despite wartime challenges, Global Spirits has maintained limited production and continued export flows through logistics hubs in Poland and the Baltic states.

== Recognition and awards ==
Khortytsia Platinum took a gold medal at both the 2017 New York and Los Angeles International Spirits Competitions, following the distillery’s citation as one of the “world’s best” at the 2014 New York International Spirits Competition. Earlier, the Beverage Testing Institute awarded the same expression a gold medal and a 90-point rating, describing it as “exceptional.”

== Ownership and management ==
Khortytsia is wholly owned by Global Spirits, whose supervisory board is chaired by founder Yevhen Chernyak, ranked nineteenth on Forbes Ukraine’s 2024 rich list with an estimated fortune of US $470 million.
