= Clique (vodka) =

Latvian vodka brand

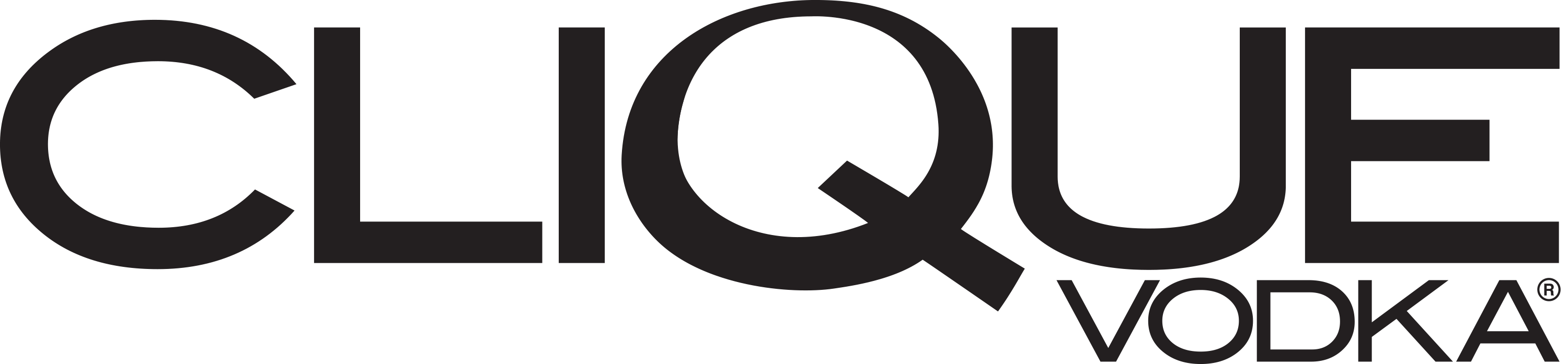
- Type: Vodka
- Manufacturer: Premier Innovations Group
- Country of origin: Latvia
- Introduced: 2010 in United States
- Related products: List of vodkas
- Website: www.cliquevodka.com

Clique is a brand of vodka. It is produced in Latvia and imported to the United States, where it is sold by Premier Innovations Group, a Pittsburgh-based company with headquarters in the Strip District. Clique is a "mid-shelf vodka," with a target price of about $16 per bottle, as opposed to "premium" vodka, like Grey Goose. This allows the brand to focus on targeting a relatively a younger demographic.

The vodka was first sold in Pennsylvania in 2010; Tennessee in 2011; Ohio and West Virginia in 2012. In May 2012, Premier Innovations Group reached a distribution deal with Total Wine & More to sell the vodka in 12 other states and Puerto Rico and India.

It was the Silver Medal for Taste in the 2012 San Francisco World Spirits Competition.

Known Clique sponsorships:

- WERA Motorcycle Racer Aaron Borello
- Goldyard, an Atlanta-based music group
