= Batini =

Batini may refer to:

- Bateinoi or Batini, an old Germanic tribe recorded by Ptolemy
- Batin (Islam), inner meaning and esotericism in Islam in Shi'i Islam
- Batiniyya, those who believe the hidden meaning of the Quran
- Batini (drink), an alcoholic drink
