= Cirrus Vodka =

American vodka brand

- Type: Vodka
- Manufacturer: Parched Group, LLC
- Origin: United States
- Introduced: 2004
- Proof (US): 80
- Related products: List of vodkas
- Website: www.cirrusvodka.com

Cirrus Vodka is an American potato vodka brand manufactured in Richmond, Virginia, by the Parched Group. The brand was introduced in 2004, and re-established in 2014 after a foreclosure in 2013.

== Awards ==
Gold medal - 2006 San Francisco World Spirits Competition.

Bronze medal, Packaging - 2005 San Francisco World Spirits Competition.
