= Platinka =

Brand of vodka

Platinka Original
- Type: Vodka
- Manufacturer: BelAlco
- Country of origin: Belarus
- Introduced: 2012
- Alcohol by volume: 40.0%
- Proof (US): 80
- Related products: List of vodkas

Platinka is a brand of vodka manufactured in Brest, Belarus and owned by Atlanta, Georgia-based World Elite Spirits, LLC.

== Awards ==
Platinka Original has received several awards from various venues in Eastern Europe marketed under the brand name (Russian: Платиновая, "Platinum"), including gold medals at Gold Griffin (Yalta 2010), INTERFOOD Drinks (St. Peterburg 2008) and MinExpo (Minsk 2009).

US spirit ratings organizations evaluated Platinka in 2012, awarding it the Best Vodka and Double Gold medal distinction at the 2012 San Francisco World Spirits Competition. At the 2012 Ultimate Spirits Challenge, it was awarded 88 points, a result in the category of Very Good, Strong Recommendation. As of September 2014, ratings aggregator Proof66 put Plantika's Platinum Filtered Vodka among its Top 20 rated vodkas.
