= VKA =

VKA may refer to:

- Vitamin K antagonist
- VKA Vodka
