= Campeon =

Tequila brand

- Type: Tequila
- Manufacturer: Campeon Spirits
- Country of origin: Mexico
- Alcohol by volume: 40%
- Proof (US): 80
- Website: Campeon

Campeon is a brand of tequila produced from Blue Agave, grown in the Eastern Highlands of Jalisco in Mexico. The drink received considerable recognition during the San Francisco World Spirits Competition in 2011.

== Production ==
According to their claim Campeon Tequila only distilled twice "to achieve ... maximum flavor and intensity"

== Products ==
- Campeon Silver
- Campeon Reposado
- Campeon Anejo

== Awards ==
- 2011 Bronze Medal for Campeon Reposado tequila
- 2011 Silver Medal for Campeon Silver tequila
- 2011 Gold Medal for Campeon Anejo tequila
