= VÄD =

- Type: Vodka
- Manufacturer: New Age Wine & Spirits
- Country of origin: United States
- Introduced: 2009
- Discontinued: 2013
- Proof (US): 80
- Related products: List of vodkas

VÄD was a brand of vodka. Produced in the United States by New Age Wine and Spirits, VÄD underwent quintuple distillation. The cap of VÄD bottles served as a shot glass, a bar jigger or a shot glass rimmer. VÄD received a silver medal in the 2010 San Francisco World Spirits Competition.

== Varieties ==
VÄD Vodka was available in three varieties:

- VODKA - distilled from winter wheat and briefly aged in American oak barrels
- SYNERGY (BLACK) - flavorless infusions of caffeine, guarana and ginseng
- THRIVE (WHITE)- infusions of antioxidants and vitamins
