= V44 =

V44 may refer to:

- V44 (vodka), a Lithuanian vodka
- ITU-T V.44, a data compression standard
- SMS V44, a torpedo boat of the Imperial German Navy
- Vanadium-44, an isotope of vanadium
