= Blue Diamond Vodka =

Estonian vodka brand

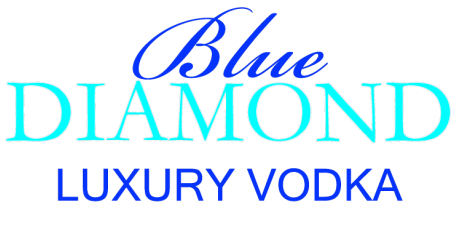
- The logo of Blue Diamond Vodka
- Type: Vodka
- Origin: Estonia
- Introduced: 2014 in United States
- Alcohol by volume: 40.0%
- Proof (US): 80
- Related products: List of vodkas
- Website: www.bluediamondvodka.com

Blue Diamond Vodka is a brand of grain based vodka distilled in Estonia and imported into the United States by Vodka Brands. The 80-proof vodka is made from rye-grain imported from Finland and its water is sourced from an artesian well.

== Reviews ==
The vodka was awarded "double-gold" in the 2013 San Francisco World Spirits Competition.
