= Belaya Rus vodka =

Brand of vodka

Belaya Rus
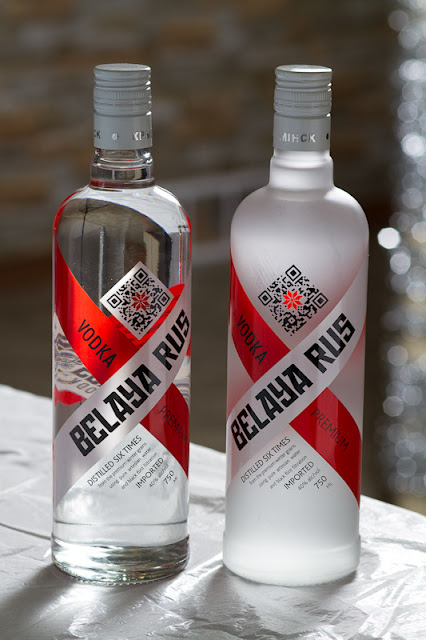
- Type: Vodka
- Manufacturer: Minsk Kristall
- Origin: Minsk, Belarus
- Introduced: 1993
- Alcohol by volume: 40
- Proof (US): 80
- Related products: List of vodkas
- Website: www.belayarusvodka.com

Belaya Rus (Belarusian: Белая Русь) is a brand of vodka distilled in Belarus from a blend of premium hard winter wheat (25%) and rye (75%) using pure artesian water drawn from wells 300 m (1,000 ft) deep. The alcohol content of this spirit is 40%, (eighty proof), priced similarly to Smirnoff and Svedka. "Belaya Rus" literally translates as "White Ruthenia".

== Awards ==
=== New York International Spirits Competition ===
- 2013 Double Gold Medal and "Rye Vodka of the Year"

=== International Review of Spirits Competition: Beverage Tasting Institute of Chicago ===
- 2011 Silver Medal and "Best Buy" Award with "Highly Recommended" ratings (89 points)

=== Other International Competitions ===
- Best Belarusian Product of the Year in Russia 2006"
- Best product of the Year 2003"
