= Xellent Swiss Vodka =

Swiss rye vodka

Xellent
- Type: Vodka
- Manufacturer: Diwisa
- Country of origin: Switzerland
- Introduced: 2004
- Alcohol by volume: 40%
- Proof (US): 80
- Colour: transparent
- Related products: List of vodkas

Xellent Swiss Vodka is a rye vodka distilled in Switzerland.

== Presentation ==
Xellent Swiss vodka is made with bread quality rye and Titlis Glacier Water. This rye is a blend of matador and picasso ryes created to grow in the alps of Switzerland. It is triple distilled in pot stills to over 96% purity.

This brand is available in over 22 countries including the United States.

This brand is packaged in a bottle reminiscent of the old cocktail shakers. It is red with white letters - using the colors of the Swiss Flag.

The brand has won numerous awards including a Double Gold from the San Francisco Spirits Competition and a 96-100 rating from F. Paul Pacult's Spirit Journal. It was also rated as the only vodka in the top 10 of the top 110 spirits for 2005 by Pacult's Spirit Journal .
