= L'Chaim Vodka =

Line of kosher alcoholic beverages

L'Chaim Kosher Vodka
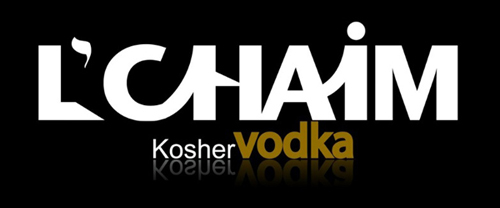
- Type: Vodka
- Manufacturer: L'Chaim Kosher Vodka
- Origin: Israel
- Introduced: 2010
- Proof (US): 80
- Related products: List of vodkas
- Website: www.lchaimkoshervodka.com

L'Chaim Kosher Vodka is a line of Israeli kosher alcoholic beverages. It is distributed by Group Force Capital, LLC of Miami, Florida, in the Wynwood Art District. L'Chaim (meaning “to life” in Hebrew) is certified kosher by the Orthodox Union.

== History ==
L'Chaim Vodka was first sold in New York, New Jersey, and Florida in 2010. In 2011, L'Chaim signed a national distribution contract with Southern Wine & Spirits.

== Products ==
L'Chaim Kosher Vodka is a corn-based vodka made with water from springs in the Golan Heights, in Israel-occupied Syria. The vodka undergoes a triple distillation process in Or Akiva, Israel. The product line is certified as kosher.

In 2012, L'Chaim launched a kosher for Passover vodka made from beets instead of corn. The Kosher for Passover edition has a gold design on the bottle, as opposed to silver.

L'Chaim also produces wine.
