= Philadelphia Whiskey Festival =

The Philadelphia Whiskey Festival is annual festival held in November, and it is sponsored by the Pennsylvania Liquor Control Board and Philadelphia Magazine. Over sixty distilled spirits producers present a wide variety of spirits for tasting, including: whiskey, Canadian and Irish whiskies, Bourbon, Scotch, single malts, tequila, rum, gin, vodka and cognac.

The festival includes a buffet as well as a raffle to benefit The Philadelphia Committee to End Homelessness.

== See also ==
- American Whiskey Trail
- Pittsburgh Whiskey & Fine Spirits Festival
