= Mariette (vodka) =

Neutral Spirit produced in Bordeaux, France

Vodka Mariette is a neutral spirit produced in Bordeaux, France.

== Product description ==
Mariette is distilled five times using French, GMO-free whole wheat and water from the Ambes Spring in Bordeaux. The vodka is also produced in three flavors including 'Raspberry & Pomegranate', 'Vanilla & Coconut' and 'Orange & Pineapple'. All flavors use natural ingredients, are 40% Alc./Vol. (80 proof) and certified kosher by the Orthodox Union. Mariette is a female French name that translates to 'Little Rebel' and the vodka comes packaged in 'neckless' bottle.

== History ==
The brand was launched in the US market during Fall of 2014, first appearing as an event sponsor for Lincoln Center in New York City.

In 2016, Mariette launched its Yes to Vodka, No to Catcalling initiative, in which all truck drivers transporting Vodka Mariette are required to sign an oath to never engage in behaviour considered "street harassment" or "catcalling" towards any individual at any time.

== Awards ==
In 2014, Mariette Vanilla & Coconut received a Gold Medal, and Mariette Orange & Pineapple received a Silver Medal for Best Flavored Vodkas from The Fifty Best. For 2016, the brand was granted the Star Diamond Award from the American Academy of Hospitality Sciences.

== See also ==
- List of vodkas
