= Ruskova =

Brand of Russian vodka

Ruskova Vodka
- Type: Vodka
- Manufacturer: 7 Mile Spirits LLC
- Country of origin: Nizhny Novgorod, Russia
- Introduced: 2007
- Alcohol by volume: 40%; 50%
- Proof (US): 80; 100
- Related products: List of vodkas
- Website: www.ruskova.com

Ruskova is a Russian vodka that is distilled in the region of Nizhniy Novgorod. Ruskova is a product manufactured under 7 Mile Spirits LLC and is owned by an entrepreneur Boris Nikomarov.

Nikomarov has recently announced that Ruskova has gone through a complete label modification and repackaging.

The manufacturer had plans to start selling this vodka in South America, but currently operates throughout the United States and Alaska.

== Flavors ==
- 80 Proof (red label)
- Peach
- Orange Pineapple
- Elderflower
- Citron
- Raspberry
