= Vodka 14 =

American vodka

- Type: Vodka
- Manufacturer: Altitude Spirits
- Origin: United States
- Introduced: 2005 in United States
- Alcohol by volume: 40.0%
- Proof (US): 80
- Related products: List of vodkas

Vodka 14 is a vodka distilled in Rigby, ID and marketed by Altitude Spirits of Boulder, CO. The product holds a USDA organic certification. It is distilled from organic corn and rye with Rocky Mountain spring water from the Snake River Aquifer in eastern Idaho. It debuted at the Healthy Gourmet Festival in Aspen, Colorado.

Vodka 14 received the Platinum Award at the 2009 Spirits International Prestige (SIP) Awards competition in San Diego, CA. Two years prior won the silver medal at the 2007 San Francisco World Spirits Competition.

== History ==
Vodka 14 began as an idea between Matthew Baris and Jonathan Weiss. The two NYU graduates decided that Colorado needed a small-batch vodka, similar to the micro-brewed beers popular in the state. As a result, Matthew and his father Mitch started Altitude Spirits and began producing Vodka 14. The Vodka is currently available throughout Colorado and online.

== Label ==
100% neutral spirits distilled from certified organic grain produced exclusively for Altitude Spirits, Inc., Boulder, Colorado. Distilled by Altitude Spirits, Inc., Rigby, Idaho. Certified organic by Oregon Tilth. Produced in the USA.

== Colorado ==
Vodka 14 is distilled in Idaho, but is owned and operated by a company based in Boulder, Colorado, and is sold primarily in Colorado. Much of the packaging and marketing makes reference to the state of Colorado. For example, the bottle art is a picture of Wilson Peak. The 14 is a reference to the fact that Colorado's tallest mountains stand 14,000 feet above sea level.
