= Zirkova =

Canadian brand of Ukrainian vodka

Zirkova Vodka

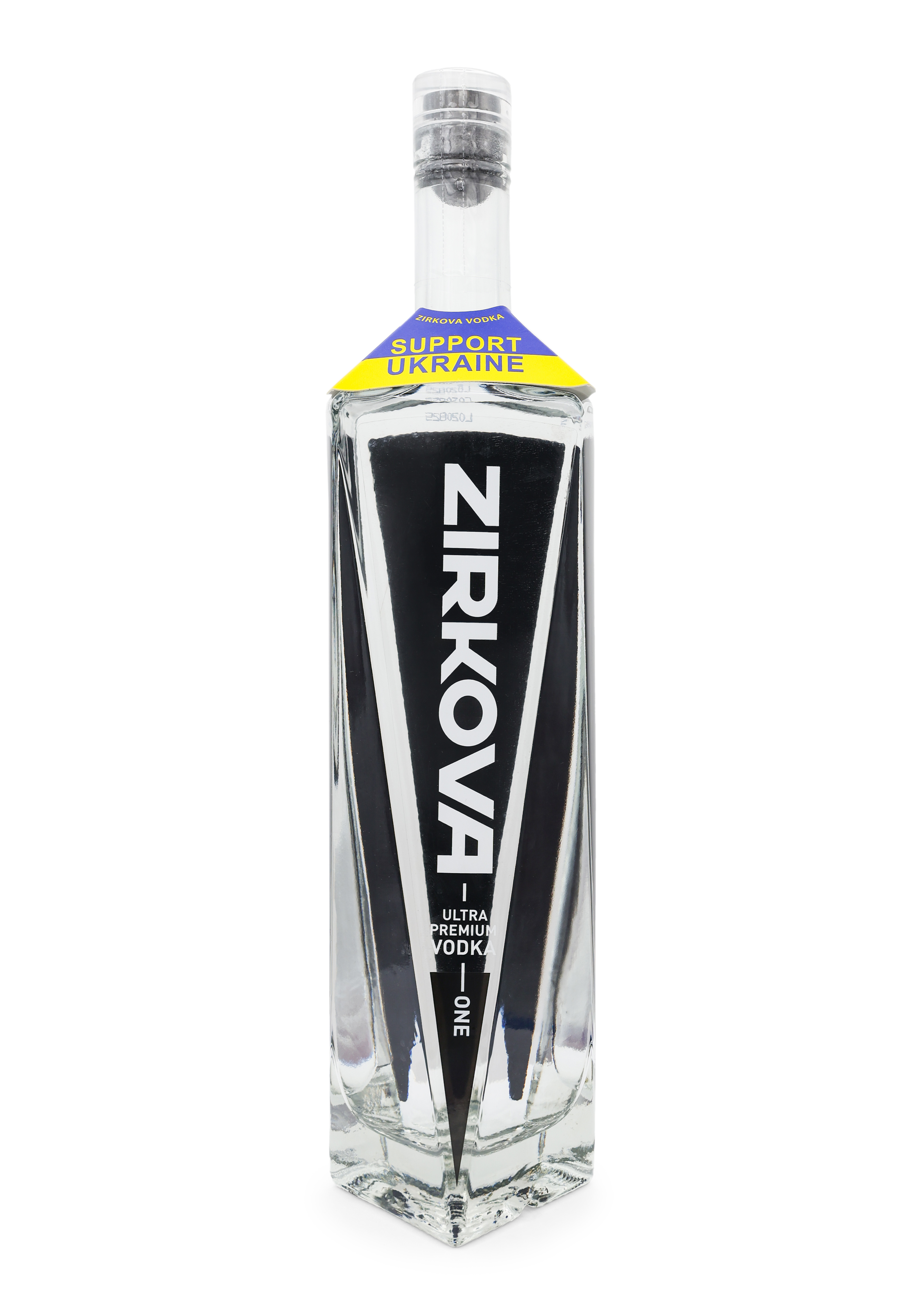
- Zirkova One
- Type: Alcoholic beverage
- Manufacturer: Zirkova
- Introduced: 2005; 21 years ago
- Alcohol by volume: 40%
- Style: vodka
- Website: www.zirkova.com

Zirkova is a Canadian brand of vodka distilled in Zolotonosha, Ukraine, and headquartered in Oakville, Ontario. Established in 2005 by John and Katherine Vellinga, the company initially produced vodka under the Slava and Zirkova labels before discontinuing the former. Twice seeking funds through the Dragons' Den television series, the company was valued at CA$10 million by 2012. Zirkova experienced reduced sales during the COVID-19 pandemic. After the 2022 Russian invasion of Ukraine, Zirkova began to donate profits to humanitarian projects in Ukraine; it also developed an Ontario-distilled product.

Several Zirkova products are sold, including Zirkova One for sipping and Zirkova Together for cocktails. Sales are primarily concentrated in Ontario through the Liquor Control Board of Ontario, though the product is also distributed in Western Canada.

== History ==
=== Establishment ===
Zirkova ("starry", from the root зірка) was established by John and Katherine Vellinga, a couple who had met while studying engineering the University of Waterloo. John, born in Waterloo, Ontario, learned about vodka from Katherine's Ukrainian-Canadian family. The couple worked as consultants in Ukraine beginning in 1997 before returning to Canada in 2002. Upon returning to Canada, John Vellinga worked with Wayne Goranson to establish Multiculture Marketing, which imported Ukrainian beers, wines, and vodkas, for the Canadian market.

Zirkova was established in 2005, and is headquartered in Oakville, Ontario; it is one of several vodka brands headquartered in the province. Zirkova works in conjunction with the Zlatogor Distillery in Zolotonosha, Ukraine, south of Kyiv, which had been commissioned by Tsar Nicholas II of Russia in 1895. Ingredients are sourced throughout Ukraine. The company initially worked with master distiller Ludmilla Petrivna, though it later partnered with Svitlana Protsenko.

=== Early years ===
Initially, Zirkova produced two lines of vodka, an "ultra-premium" line named Slava and a "premium" line named Zirkova, with the latter at a lower price point. These were developed over the course of two years and more than twenty formulations. Slava became one of the Liquor Control Board of Ontario (LCBO)'s best-selling brands in the over-CA$30 range, and both it and Zirkova won gold at the San Francisco World Spirits Competition. John Vellinga appeared on the television series Dragons' Den twice. For his first appearance in 2010, he won the Viewers' Choice award for favourite "pitcher" who received no deal. During his second appearance, in 2012, he requested CA$500,000 in support, but received no backing from the show's "dragons". By this point, Zirkova reported annual revenues of CA$512,000 and a company value of CA$10 million.

In 2016, Zirkova employed several marketing approaches, including a Caesar Challenge, a series of "Vodka 101" seminars, and in-store tastings. It also promoted humanitarian rights, sponsoring a Mr. Gay Syria campaign through its non-profit We Are One+Together, facilitating the asylum claims of five gay Syrian refugees who participated in the competition, and partnering with the MeToo movement. By 2018, the Slava line had been discontinued, being rebranded Zirkova One, with Zirkova Together as a mixing vodka. Zirkova also experienced difficulty during the COVID-19 pandemic.

=== Russian invasion of Ukraine ===
In the months before the 2022 Russian invasion of Ukraine, Katherine Vellinga became convinced that Russia–Ukraine relations had moved beyond "sabre-rattling" based on feedback from relatives and workers in Ukraine. She urged distributors to pre-emptively order more stock, but this did not occur, and Zirkova faced supply chain disruptions in the weeks before the invasion began on February 24. By March 4, the distillery in Zolotonosha was inactive, as most residents had evacuated or had deployed to fight the Russian invasion. Zirkova's main products, Zirkova One and Zirkova Together, thus ceased production. Likewise, existing products were not being exported, with "thousands of cases stranded in warehouses."

To support Ukrainians, Zirkova began to donate the profits from sales of existing stock to humanitarian aid, while also raising awareness of the situation in Canada; within a year, it had donated more than CA$30,000. Bottles began to be displayed with Ukrainian flags. When pre-invasion stocks began to be depleted, Zirkova brought master distiller Svitlana Protsenko to Canada and began producing a new product, Zirkova Unity, in Collingwood, Ontario. The product launched in June 2022. In August 2022, stock remaining in Ukraine was exported to Canada. In September 2022, Zirkova reopened its Ukrainian distillery, though production had yet to reach pre-invasion levels by November.

== Products ==
Zirkova is made of wheat and rye and available in several versions. Zirkova One is a sipping vodka, described as having notes of almond, vanilla, hay and citrus. For cocktails, Zirkova sells Zirkova Together. Zirkova Unity is made using Canadian wheat and water, with bottles featuring backings by Ukrainian and Canadian artists that depict such subjects as cranes and decorated eggs. It has been described as having "an aftertaste of aromatic homemade bread and a variety of berries and herbs". A flavoured vodka, Zirkova Hot Honey Vodka, was introduced in 2022 and modelled after Ukrainian honey-pepper vodka. The discontinued Slava was made of centre-cut rye and quadruple distilled.

Zirkova sales are primarily through the LCBO. Plans to extend distribution through Western Canada were initially disrupted by the Russian invasion of Ukraine, but by the end of 2022 Zirkova had begun sales in Manitoba and Saskatchewan. The company has also endeavoured to expand distribution to Asia and the United States.

== Works cited ==
- Binelli, Brianne (May 3, 2010). "Vodka Innovator Takes Viewers' Choice on Dragons' Den". Foodservice and Hospitality. Archived from the original on April 3, 2026.
- "Canadian Entrepreneur Uses Business to Support Ukraine". Global News. February 27, 2023. Archived from the original on April 3, 2026.
- Chai, Daniel (March 4, 2022). "'Our Motherland Is Under Fire': Ukrainian-Canadian Vodka Maker Speaks Out on Russian invasion". Daily Hive. Archived from the original on April 3, 2026.
- Coppolino, Andrew (March 17, 2021). "Waterloo Duo Says 'Budmo!' with Ultra-Premium Ukrainian Vodka". Waterloo Chronicle. Waterloo – via ProQuest.
- Davy, Denise (November 30, 2022). "Discover The Spirit of Ukraine: The Zirkova Vodka Story". Look Local. Archived from the original on April 3, 2026.
- "Drink Review: Zirkova Vodka One + Together". Foodism. July 16, 2018. Archived from the original on April 3, 2026.
- Harper, Jo; Smale, Will (April 19, 2023). "Ukrainian Vodka Producers Toast a Rise in Global Sales". BBC. Archived from the original on April 3, 2026.
- Johnstone, Bruce (May 28, 2004). "Partners Find Market for Ukrainian Beer". Star-Phoenix. Saskatoon. p. C13 – via ProQuest.
- Laurie, Scott (March 7, 2022). "Making a Difference in Ukraine with Pierogies and Vodka". Toronto Sun. Archived from the original on April 3, 2026.
- O'Connor, Joe (March 4, 2022). "'Legendary' Ukrainian Resourcefulness Inspires Canadian Vodka CEO Into Action". Financial Post. Archived from the original on April 3, 2026.
- Peddie, Christine (2022). "Zirkova Unity Brings Together the Craftsmanship of Ukraine with the Heart and Harvest of Canada". Taste Toronto. Archived from the original on April 3, 2026.
- "Slava Vodka is Now Zirkova One". Slava Vodka. Archived from the original on December 24, 2021.
- "Vodka Quietly Accounts for About One Third of Spirits Sold in Canada". The Brampton Guardian. Brampton. January 18, 2016. p. 1 – via ProQuest.
- Vyge, John (2012). The Dragons' Den Guide to Investor-Ready Business Plans. Hoboken, New Jersey: Wiley. ISBN 978-1-118-31382-4.
- Wallace-Lynch, Laurie (February 6, 2023). "Canadian Vodka CEO Is Helping Ukraine Every Way She Can". TO Times. Archived from the original on April 3, 2026.
- "We Are One+Together Launches 'Mr Gay Syria' Campaign + Premieres Film". The Untitled Magazine. June 23, 2017. Archived from the original on April 3, 2026.
- "Zirkova Unity". Zirkova. Archived from the original on April 27, 2026.
- "Зірковий — Тлумачення" [Star — Definition]. Goroh (in Ukrainian). Archived from the original on April 3, 2026.
