= Kissui =

Japanese vodka

- Type: Vodka
- Manufacturer: Takara Shuzo
- Origin: Japan
- Introduced: 2006 in United States
- Alcohol by volume: 40.0%
- Proof (US): 80
- Related products: List of vodkas

Kissui (生粋; lit. 'absolutely pure') is a brand of vodka from Japan. In 2007, it was the only Japanese vodka available in the US. Kissui is distilled and bottled by Takara Shuzo in Kyoto, Japan. It is distilled from rice then blended with natural spring water from Fushimi, Kyoto.
