= Batini (drink) =

A Batini is a vodka-based cocktail that is the official drink of the Austin Bat Fest. The drink was created by bartenders from the Four Seasons Hotel Austin.

== History ==
In August 2004, The Austin Convention and Visitor's Bureau hosted a contest to designate the official drink of Austin. Five Austin-area hotels submitted recipes to become the official Batini for the city. The Four Seasons Austin recipe won the contest and was on the menu at the Lobby Lounge.

In 2006, the Four Seasons won the Batini contest again with their "Batini Black" entrant. The Batini black was similar to the original, including Tito's Vodka, and Blue Curacao but added in a splash of simple syrup, grapefruit juice, champagne and fresh blackberries.

A Batini contest is an annual event for local bartenders at the Austin Bat Fest.

== Ingredients and preparation ==
The ingredients needed for the Batini are:

- Tito's Vodka
- Chambord
- Blue Curacao
- Sangria
- Red wine
- Cherry garnish

All of the ingredients are shaken together and served with a cherry garnish.

== Variations ==
=== Batini Black ===
Ingredients in a Batini Black are:

- Tito's Vodka
- Blue Curacao
- Splash of simple syrup
- Grapefruit juice
- Fresh blackberries
- Topped with champagne

Shake together Tito's, Blue Curacao, splash of simple syrup, grapefruit juice, and fresh blackberries. Strain into a cocktail glass and top off with champagne.
