= Vox (vodka) =

Vodka product line

Vox Vodka was an 80 proof grain vodka made in the Netherlands by Suntory Global Spirits, a subsidiary of Suntory Holdings of Osaka, Japan. Liquor ratings aggregator, Proof66.com, places Vox in the top 10th percentile of the best vodkas in the world.

== See also ==
- List of vodkas
