= Oso Negro =

Oso Negro (Spanish: "Black Bear") is a brand of vodka and gin. Distilled and bottled in Mexico, these liquors are bottled in one liter, 750 milliliter, and 250 milliliter presentations. The alcoholic concentration of the vodka is 38%. In Mexico, vodka and gin are commonly mixed with other beverages or fruit juices such as orange, pineapple, lemon or tomato, creating beverages including the "Screwdriver" with orange juice, the "Bloody Mary" with tomato and lemon and some "Martini's" with fruit.

Oso Negro is owned by Jose Cuervo.

== Awards ==
Oso Negro received a silver medal at the 2008 San Francisco World Spirits Competition.
