= Tito's Vodka =

Brand of vodka

Tito's Handmade Vodka
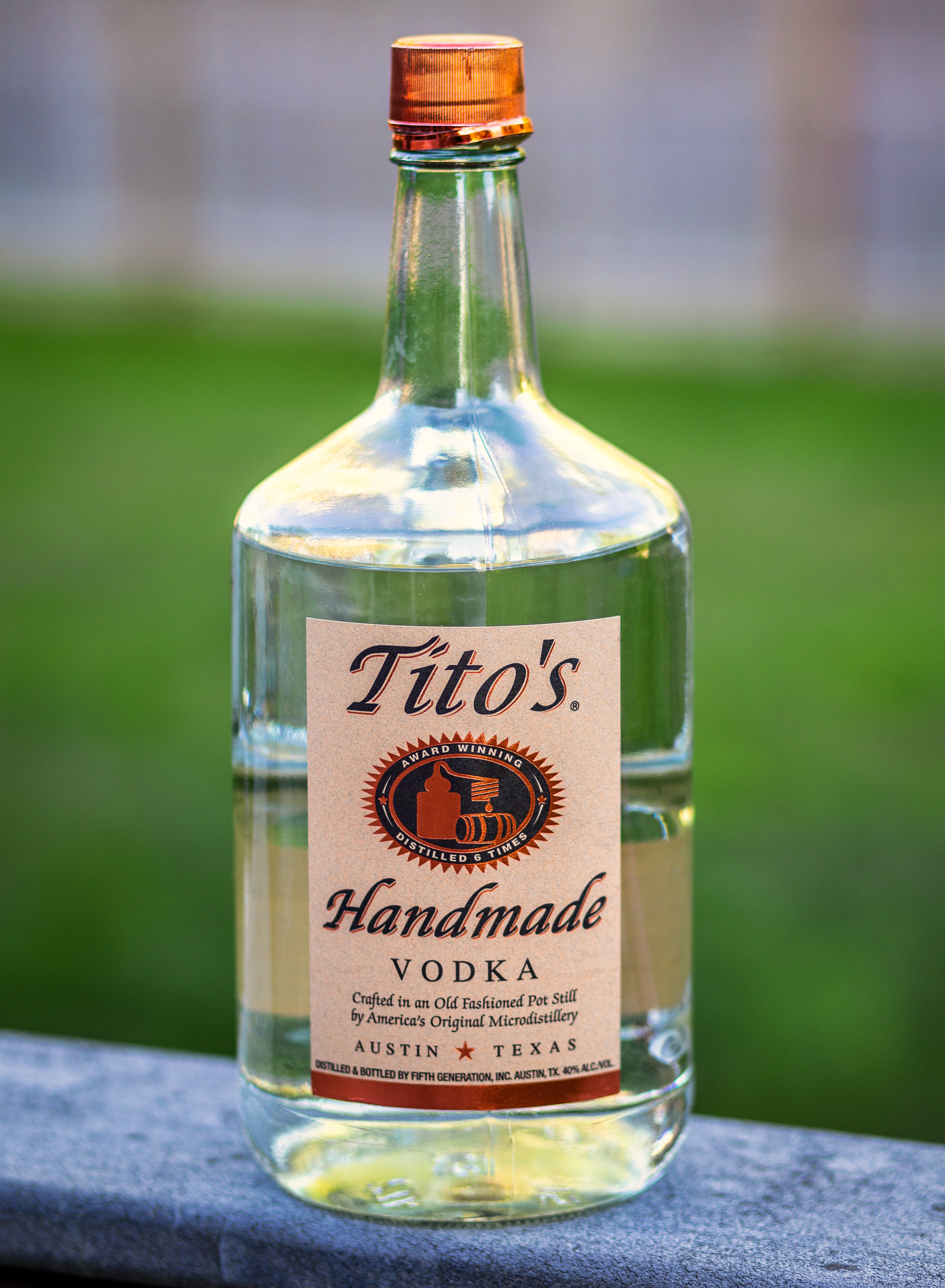
- 1.75L size bottle
- Type: Vodka
- Manufacturer: Fifth Generation, Inc.
- Distributor: Fifth Generation, Inc.
- Origin: United States, Austin, Texas
- Alcohol by volume: 40%
- Proof (US): 80
- Ingredients: yellow corn
- Website: www.titosvodka.com

Tito's Handmade Vodka is a vodka brand made by Fifth Generation, founded by Tito Beveridge in 1997 in Austin, Texas – specializing in vodka made from yellow corn, rather than potatoes or wheat. It is distilled six times and unaged.

Marketing its brand as "Tito's Handmade Vodka", the company originally craft-distilled its products in copper-pot stills at Texas' first legal distillery. By 2001, the brand was no longer a microdistillery, having surpassed the industry standard of 40,000 cases for a craft distillery as defined by the Distilled Spirits Council of the United States.

Now made in a facility with 10 floor-to-ceiling stills and equipment bottling 500 cases an hour, the brand recorded a sales volume around 3.8 million 9-liter cases in the United States as of 2016 and a market share of 7.1% of the United States vodka market as of 2017.

== History ==
Beveridge first produced his spirits as a hobby after making infusions of inexpensive vodka as gifts and using a pot still. Commercial production began in 1997 when Beveridge formed Fifth Generation, Inc. and established the Mockingbird Distillery, producing 1,000 cases that year. In 2007, the brand sold over 160,000 cases. Production remains at the heavily expanded southeast Austin distillery.

Sales and distribution of Tito's Handmade Vodka expanded in 2001 after it won the Double Gold Medal for vodka at the San Francisco World Spirits Competition. Also that year, it received a four-star ranking from Spirit Journal and won four stars again in the 2007 edition. Beginning in 2013, United Airlines began serving only Tito's for its inflight vodka beverages.

Tito's is distributed throughout the United States and Canada. The distillery transitioned to making industry-approved hand sanitizer during the COVID-19 pandemic. Tito's also made a grant of $1 million towards the development of COVID-19 vaccine Corbevax.

In 2025 Tito's acquired a majority stake in LALO Tequila.

== Handmade controversy ==
In 2014, two false advertising lawsuits were filed against Tito's in California and Florida. The California lawsuit alleged that Tito's vodka cannot be described as "handmade" because it is distilled in a large industrial complex with modern, technologically advanced stills, and is produced and bottled in extremely large quantities. Since the Alcohol and Tobacco Tax and Trade Bureau, which regulates labeling of liquor in the US, does not actually define "handmade", both lawsuits rely on the dictionary definition of the word. By 2016, the lawsuits had either been settled out of court or dismissed.

== Tito's Prize ==
Tito's Vodka funds the annual Tito's Prize – an annual $15,000 award for one Austin-based artist, facilitated by the nonprofit gallery Big Medium. The award also includes a solo exhibition at the Big Medium Gallery at Canopy. It is the largest award devoted to Austin-based artists.

Previous Tito's Prize winners are Ariel René Jackson and Michael J. Love (2021), Betelhem Makonnen (2019), Steve Parker (2018), and Zack Ingram (2017).
