= Stolnaya vodka =

Brand of Russian vodka

Stolnaya Vodka
- Type: Vodka
- Manufacturer: Ost-Alco
- Country of origin: Russia
- Introduced: 1996
- Proof (US): 80
- Related products: List of vodkas

Stolnaya (Стольная) is a brand of vodka released by OST-Alco. The range consists of Stolnaya Special, Stolnaya Red Bilberry, which is made with cranberries, and Stolnaya Infusion which contains extracts of honey and pepper.

== Trademark dispute ==
OST-Alco, distributors of the Stolnaya brand, has been involved in a running dispute with SPI Group, manufacturers of Stolichnaya brand vodka, concerning trademark rights. SPI claims that the "Stolnaya" brand is confusingly similar to "Stolichnaya". A number of jurisdictions, including the United Kingdom have withdrawn or refused registration of the Stolnaya brand because of SPI's objections.
