= Ström Vodka =

Finnish vodka

Ström
- Type: Vodka
- Other name: Strom
- Manufacturer: Shaman Spirits
- Origin: Finland
- Ingredients: Water, grain, potatoes

Ström is a premium vodka, distilled by Shaman Spirits in Finland. The raw ingredients used are "spring-quality" water, grain and surplus potatoes harvested from the fields of Tyrnävä (near Oulu), an EU-graded high grade potato production area.

Besides Finland, Ström is available in the Baltic states, Poland, Italy, Spain and North America. It is marketed internationally by Atlantico Beverages Ltd Oy.

In 2005, Ström Vodka won the Gold Award in the Super-Premium potato vodka category at the 7th International Wines & Spirits Contest held in Moscow. Ström Vodka was also awarded the shared title of Best Beverage of Finland in a 2005 annual contest. Its smoothness was lauded by the panel.

== See also ==
- List of vodka brands
