= Shustov vodka =

Brand of Russian vodka

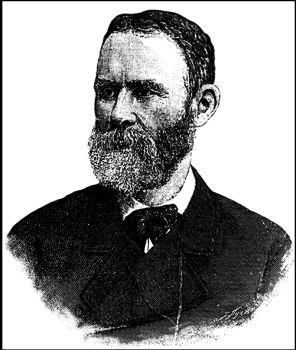
Nikolay Shustov

Shustov (Шустов) is a brand of Russian vodka.

== History ==
Nikolay Shustov, a 40-year-old merchant, started the company in 1863 with a small liquor distillery, based in the former farriery building on Maroseyka Street in Moscow.

== Sources ==
Shustov Vodka
- Type: Vodka
- Manufacturer: Ost-Alco
- Country of origin: Chernogolovka, Russia
- Introduced: 1998
- Proof (US): 80
- Related products: List of vodkas

- OST-Alco @ РОСПРОДМАШСЕРВИС
