= Pittsburgh Wine Festival =

Annual event in Pennsylvania, US

- Frequency: Annual
- Inaugurated: 2003
- Organiser: Pittsburgh Wine Festival LLC
- Website: www.pittsburghwinefestival.com

The Pittsburgh Wine Festival is an annual festival celebrating wine in Pittsburgh, Pennsylvania. The festival is sponsored by the Pennsylvania Liquor Control Board, which maintains an on-site wine shop. The Pittsburgh festival follows a similar one in Philadelphia.

The first event was held in 2003, amid some questioning whether a "beer city" like Pittsburgh could sustain a wine festival. It is now well established, however, and the festival receives generally positive reviews from wine critics. In fact, tickets usually sell out. It was named to the Top 10 list of wine events in the United States by the Quarterly Review of Wines. Its success inspired the Pittsburgh Whiskey & Fine Spirits Festival.

Proceeds from the festival benefit charity. By the fourth year, in 2007, the festival had raised over $400,000 for charity. By 2009, that figure had grown to $6 million, with large portions going to Children's Hospital of Pittsburgh and the Pittsburgh Cancer Institute.
