= Lotus vodka =

Brand of vodka

Lotus Vodka
- Type: Vodka
- Manufacturer: Delicious Brands Inc.
- Origin: San Francisco, CA
- Introduced: 2007 in United States
- Alcohol by volume: 40.0%
- Proof (US): 80
- Variants: White Lotus, Blue Lotus
- Related products: List of vodkas

Lotus Vodka is a brand of vodka. It is distilled in the United States from wheat, then shipped to San Francisco to be bottled by Delicious Brands. It was first released on premises in San Francisco, CA in 2007. Lotus Vodka donates a portion of its profits to charity.

== Variants ==
Lotus Vodka is currently available in two variants:

- White Lotus - A "vitamin vodka" with added vitamin B_{3}, vitamin B_{5}, vitamin B_{6}, vitamin B_{12}, vitamin C, and others
- Blue Lotus - An "energy vodka" with added caffeine, taurine, guarana, and flavorings (a vodka energy drink)
