= Rachmaninoff (vodka) =

Vodka produced in Germany

- Type: Vodka
- Origin: Germany

Rachmaninoff is a German-produced vodka sold as a private-label spirit by the discount supermarket chain Lidl. The spirit is named after the Russian composer Sergei Rachmaninoff.

In the International Wine and Spirit Competition it received a gold award in 2015, a silver award in 2016, and a silver award in 2018.

The brand makes both 37.5%, subsequently introducing a 40% ABV variant for selected markets., (with red and blue coloured labels, respectively). Alongside its unflavoured vodkas, the brand offers flavoured and ready-to-drink off-shoots such as Rachmaninoff Vodka Lemon, which earned a silver medal in the IWSC Alternative Drinks category in 2022.

== Awards and recognition ==
- Gold, IWSC 2015 — Triple Distilled (70 cl, 37.5% ABV).
- Silver Outstanding, IWSC 2016.
- Gold, World Vodka Awards 2023 — Triple Distilled.
- Gold, ISW 2024 — 37.5% bottling.

== See also ==
- List of vodkas
