= Spirits ratings =

Ranking of Spirits

With a growing number of offerings, such as those produced by an increasing number of microdistilleries, various mechanisms have arisen to provide reviews and opinions of individual varieties of spirits. These events generally use expert panels and blind tastings within specific categories to provide opinions and ratings.

These competitions charge an entry fee. Although gold, silver and bronze awards are granted there are no limits as to how many of each may be bestowed.

Most of these events follow a similar format:

Experts typically begin by assessing a given spirit based upon its "appearance" and "nose", its aroma. It will often be held up to light in clear glass to examine its color and "legs" while sniffing for other flavor "notes".

Second, experts will taste the spirit and let it wash over the palate (tongue) searching for more "notes" or flavors and often comment about different foods or scents that it evokes.

Third, experts will swallow (or, more often, spit) and examine the taste sensations for a "second life" or aftertaste, again searching for more flavor notes.

== Major rating organizations ==
There are numerous liquor, spirits, beer and wine competitions.

=== SIP Awards ===
The SIP Awards, based in Irvine, California, was founded by Pouya Hashemi in 2009 and is the largest blind spirits tasting competition that has an all consumer judging panel. All entries are evaluated on aroma, taste and finish to determine its merits of receiving an award. Not all entries receive an award. Products are honored with the following awards based on their level of quality:

- Platinum "Best of Class" - Highest Honor
- Platinum - Superlative
- Double Gold - Exceptional
- Gold - Highly Recommended
- Silver - Recommended
- Bronze - Noteworthy

Platinum "Best of Class" is a designation that is awarded in each main category. Additionally, the Consumers' Choice Award is an exclusive medal reserved for spirit brands that manage to secure a SIP Award for two or more consecutive years. The Innovation Award is a recognition for products that are interesting and unique in their tasting profile. In addition to the blind tasting, there is an optional packaging and design competition that is conducted separately from tasting and recognizes appeal to the consumers’ aesthetic sense. Criteria for the design awards include creativity, originality, theme consistency and overall design.

In 2022, SIP Awards saw a new record high of over 1,270 spirit and mixer brand entries from all over the world.

=== Beverage Testing Institute ===
The Beverage Testing Institute is based in Chicago, US, and founded in 1981 with its initial focus on wine but later branching into spirits and beer. They use a dedicated tasting laboratory in order to create consistent results and minimize external distractions. Each periodic tasting is conducted at the same time of day under identical conditions. The panelists are selected from the professional world of restaurants and publications under the leadership of director Jerald O'Kennard. Not all spirits are given a rating. Those of sufficient merit are awarded a point score between 80 and 100.

- 80–84: Recommended
- 85–89: Highly Recommended
- 90–95: Exceptional
- 96–100: Superlative

The institute seeks to produce "fair and impartial wine reviews for consumers". Buying guides have appeared in All About Beer, Epicurious.com, International Wine Review, Wine Enthusiast, Restaurant Hospitality, The New Yorker Magazine, Wine & Spirits, etc.

=== San Francisco World Spirits Competition ===
Founded in 2000 by Anthony Dias Blue. Blue is the current director of both the San Francisco World Spirits Competition and the San Francisco International Wine Competition. It assesses hundreds of entrants annually (1407 in 2013 from 63 countries) with "blind" tastings involving panels of expert judges selected each year from the spirits industry including mixologists, spirits buyers, and media from across the United States. Producers must submit their product for the competition and pay a fee ($475 for 2013) for its evaluation. Not all entries are given awards (those not judged of sufficient quality are not given an award) but most receive a bronze, silver, or gold award from the tasting panel. The fact that most entrants receive an award likely involves some degree of self-selection, as the spirits producers choose whether to enter each of their brands in the competition and pay to receive a rating. Those entrants that are given a unanimous gold medal by the panel are given the distinction of a "double-gold" medal. Additionally, a "best in show" designation is awarded in each main category of spirits.

=== Wine Enthusiast ===
Wine Enthusiast publishes a magazine and other media to promote the appreciation of both wines and spirits. It is headquartered in New York and founded in 1979. Currently, spirits reviews are provided by F. Paul Pacult, who does tastings in a controlled environment. Results are given a point score.

- 80–84: Average
- 85–89: Very Good / Recommended
- 90–95: Superb / Highly Recommended
- 96–100: Classic / Highest Recommendation

=== World-Spirits Award ===
The World-Spirits Award was founded in 2004 by Wolfram Ortner in Austria. Annually it assesses hundreds of entrants from more than 30 countries. Members of the jury are industry experts and experienced judges primary from Austria and Germany. Not all spirits are given a rating, though in 2018 over 75% of entrants received a rating of "gold" or better. Only the highest rated spirits of sufficient merit receive medals. World-Spirits Award rankings are based upon a 71 to 100 "WOB-Points" rating scale.

- 95.3–100 Points = DOUBLE-GOLD: World Class, Superlative
- 90–95 Points = GOLD: Superb
- 80–89 Points = SILVER: Very Good
- 71–79 Points = BRONZE: Average

== Newer rating organizations ==
- Los Angeles International Wine, Spirits, Beer, and Olive Oil Competition: this competition was initially for wine only and founded in 1939. In 2007, it began receiving entries for spirits. It also rates beer and olive oil. Awards are provided for gold, silver, and bronze medals. In 2009, there were 199 entries with 179 awarded medals. in 2015, it received 365 entries, and gave out 407 rewards.
