= Dragon Bleu =

French brand of vodka

- Type: Vodka
- Country of origin: France
- Alcohol by volume: 40.0%
- Proof (US): 80
- Related products: List of vodkas

Dragon Bleu is a French brand of vodka. It is distilled and bottled in the Grande Champagne area of France from a blend of three grains: wheat, barley, and rye. Dragon Bleu is produced by French distiller Patrick Brisset, in Saint-Preuil, France. Dragon Bleu is 40% alcohol by volume (80 proof). It is produced using the water of the Gensac Spring. This vodka fits into the high-priced category.

== See also ==
- List of Vodkas
