= Royal Dragon Vodka =

Vodka brand from Canada, USA

- Type: Vodka
- Manufacturer: Royal Dragon Vodka Investment Corp.
- Origin: Lithuania
- Introduced: 2012
- Alcohol by volume: 40%
- Proof (US): 80
- Related products: List of vodkas
- Website: www.royaldragonvodka.us

Royal Dragon Vodka is a specialty vodka originally based in Hong Kong, and distilled in Lithuania. It Is produced in small batches from organically grown winter harvest rye using an original Russian recipe. It is distilled five times by their Master Distiller, who then filters each distillation through a vast chamber of vodka with outstanding purity. each Imperial bottle of Vodka is infused with certified 23.9-carat gold flakes from Switzerland and bottled in a unique hand-blown glass bottle with the legendary water dragon inside. It was created in 2012 and features flakes of gold leaf mixed with the alcohol. There are claims that it is one of the most expensive vodkas in the world. The brand comes in several different versions, the most expensive of which comes in a hand-blown glass bottle in the shape of a dragon, and topped by an 18 karat gold pendant, encrusted with 35 diamonds. The spirit is a "small batch five-time distilled vodka". In addition to its top-of-the-line version, less expensive variants include flavored vodkas, such as lychee, chocolate, green apple, and passion fruit. Of the several varieties, two come with the 23 ct Swiss flakes of gold infused into the spirit.

== See also ==
- Goldwasser
- Goldschläger
