= Glen's Vodka =

Brand of Scottish alcoholic drink

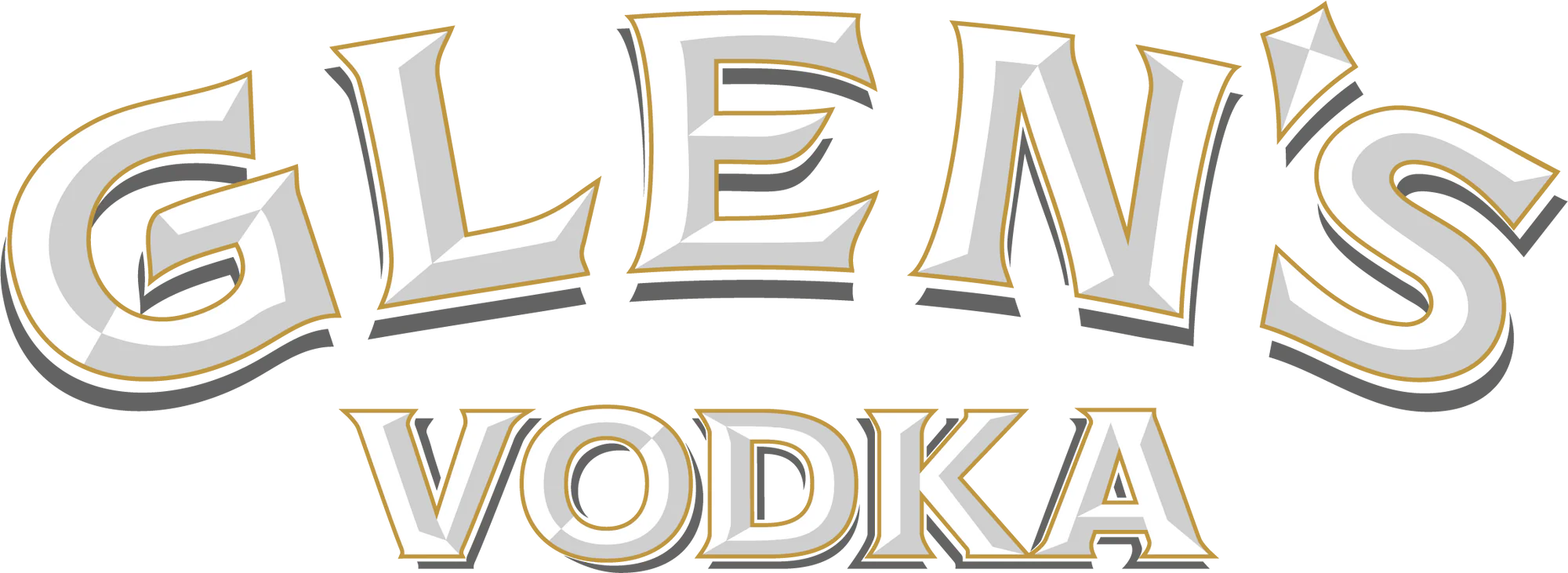
- Type: Vodka
- Manufacturer: Loch Lomond Group
- Origin: Scotland
- Introduced: 1972
- Alcohol by volume: 37.5%
- Related products: List of vodkas
- Website: glensvodka.com

Glen's Vodka is a Scottish brand of vodka, owned and produced by the Loch Lomond Group. It is produced from sugar beet at the Catrine Distillery in East Ayrshire, Scotland, and is sold by drinks retailers across the UK. It is available in 50 mL, 200 mL, 350 mL, 700 mL, and 1-litre bottles.

In 2014, Glen's Vodka was reported as the second highest selling spirits brand by volume in the UK off-trade. Separate industry coverage has ranked it as the country’s second most popular vodka and eleventh largest alcohol brand.

== History ==
Glen's Vodka was launched in 1972. The brand was originally known as Grant's Vodka, but following a legal challenge it was rebranded and relaunched as Glen's Vodka in 2003.

In 2009, Glen's Vodka came first in a blind-tasting test conducted by British newspaper The Telegraph. The tasting included a variety of premium-brand vodkas including Grey Goose and Absolut.

In 2014, Exponent Private Equity acquired the Loch Lomond Distillery Company’s assets, including Glen’s Vodka, through the newly formed Loch Lomond Group.

In 2015, Glen's launched Platinum, a 40% ABV premium grain version of Glen's Vodka.

In 2019, Hillhouse Capital acquired Loch Lomond Group, the producer of Glen’s Vodka, after five years under Exponent Private Equity’s ownership. Later that year, the range expanded with Peach & Passionfruit and Strawberry & Apple flavored spirits, both produced at 20% ABV. Also in 2019, Glen’s became sponsor of the Spirit of Super League Award.

In 2020, Glen’s became an official partner of the Scottish Professional Football League (SPFL). The partnership was extended in 2023.

In 2022, Glen’s redesigned the packaging across its product range in what trade publications described as the brand’s first major refresh since its 2003 relaunch.

Kantar take-home sales rankings placed Glen’s fourth among alcohol brands in Scotland in both 2023 and 2024.

== Counterfeiting ==
Glen's Vodka has been among several vodka brands targeted by spirits counterfeiters.

In 2008, the UK's Food Standards Agency publicised reports of counterfeit 700 mL bottles being sold. Counterfeit bottles can be easily identified: unlike authentic Glen's Vodka bottles, they do not feature the Allied Glass Containers (AGC) stamp on the bottom.

In 2011, UK authorities prosecuted a criminal gang responsible for counterfeiting Glen's Vodka. Enforcement officers seized 9,000 bottles of fake vodka from an illegal bottling plant in Leicestershire. Manufacturing equipment was also seized. Members of the gang received prison sentences of up to seven years.

In August 2024, authorities seized 40 counterfeit 35 cL bottles from a shop in Coatbridge after a customer reported a smell resembling nail-varnish remover. Testing found that the bottles contained isopropyl alcohol.

== See also ==
- List of vodkas
