= Betelhem Makonnen =

American artist

Betelhem Makonnen (1972-2026) was an Ethiopian-American artist based in Austin, Texas. She was a former curator for the Fusebox Festival and the 2019 Tito's Prize winner.
