= Jean-Marc XO Vodka =

Brand of vodka

- Type: Vodka
- Origin: France
- Alcohol by volume: 40.0%
- Proof (US): 80
- Related products: List of vodkas

Jean-Marc XO Vodka is a brand of vodka distilled in the Cognac region of France by Jean-Marc Daucourt and owned by the Campari Group.

The recipe for Jean-Marc XO includes four French wheat grains, selected for their specific flavors. Each wheat grain is separated from its chaff before distillation in order to eliminate any bitterness and to reveal the wheat's individual flavor before spring water, filtered through Grande Champagne limestone, is added. After, the vodka is distilled nine times in very small batches using copper Alambic stills before being micro-oxygenated and filtered through Limousin oak charcoal to finish. The entire process takes several weeks from start to finish. Each bottle is individually numbered.

The Jean-Marc XO was awarded 97 points by the US Beverage Testing Institute in 2007 and is honored by the American Academy of Hospitality Sciences (2005). Wine Enthusiast gave the vodka a rating of 85–89 in 2005.
