= Stumbras =

Coordinates: 54°53′23″N 23°55′52″E

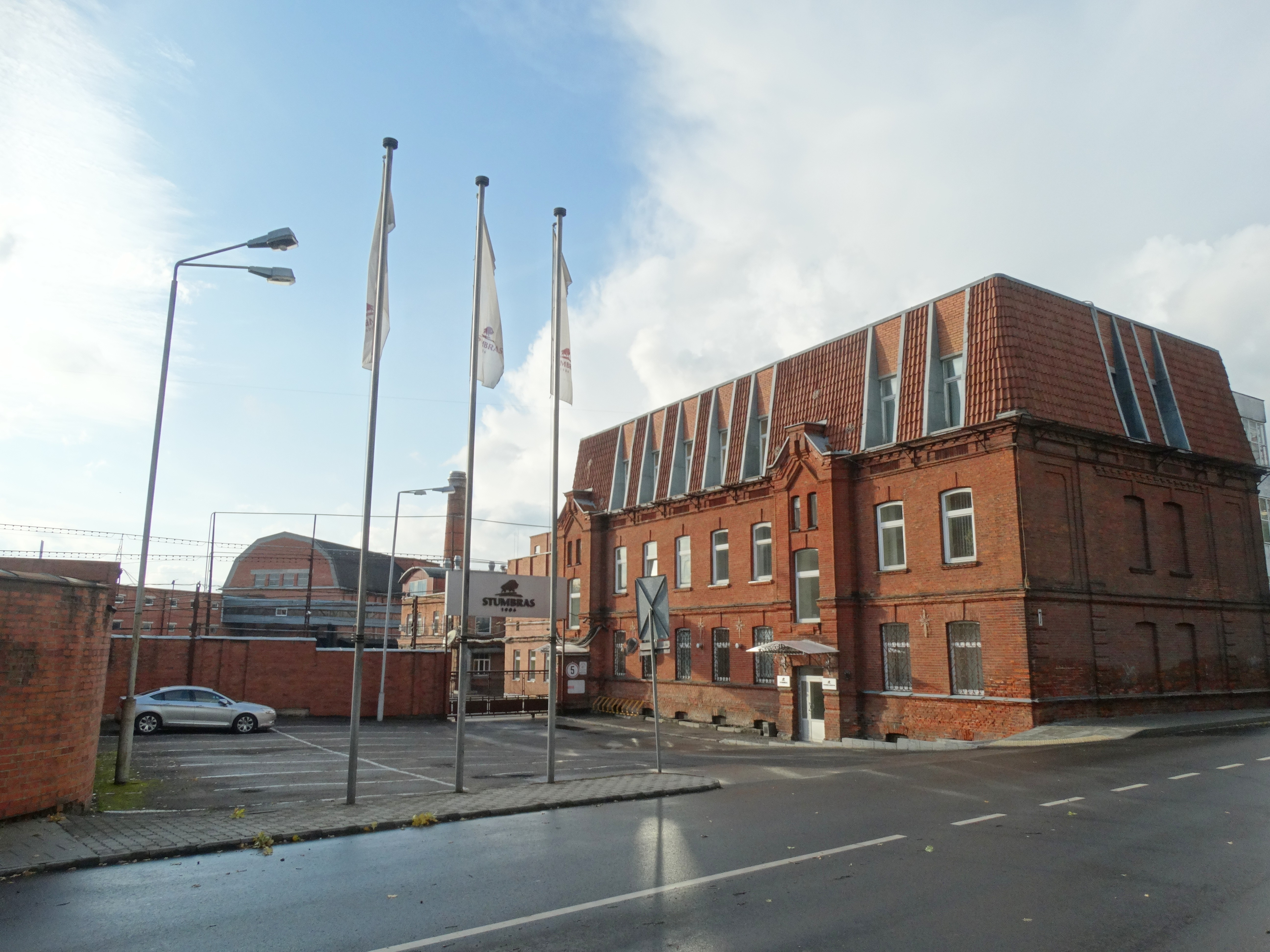
AB Stumbras, producer of strong alcoholic drinks, Kaunas, Lithuania

AB Stumbras is the oldest and largest producer of strong alcoholic drinks in Kaunas, Lithuania. The company began operations in 1906. It is also the largest exporter of strong alcoholic beverages and one of the biggest taxpayers in Lithuania. The company's most famous brands include "Lithuanian vodka" (vodka), "999" (bitter), "Gloria" (brandy), "Stumbro Starka" (bitter), "Krupnikas" (liqueur) and "Poema" (liqueur). The company name translates as Wisent.

== History ==
=== Tsarist Russia ===
The origins of "Stumbras" lie in an 1894 law on monopolizing alcohol production by state-owned enterprises in the Russian Empire. The law was expected to increase budget revenues and to improve the quality of produced vodka. The government of Kaunas acquired a suitable plot of land in 1903 for a high price of 52,200 Russian rubles. The buildings were finished and production started at the end of 1906. The official name of the company was "Kazionyj Nr.1 vinyj očistnyj sklad" (State wine warehouse No. 1). The city's name was later included in the title. The site included an electric power station, charcoal burner (for filtration purposes), canalisation, evaporation heating, three-dimensional water supply system, six artesian wells, and a rail connection.

=== German rule ===
The company was enlarged and modernised several times until 1914. During World War I, Lithuania was occupied by Germany and production of strong alcohol was forbidden. The main building was converted into a public bathhouse.

=== Interwar period ===
After the war, when Lithuania regained its independence, the cisterns were used by the Lithuanian state to store its spirits reserves and by the electric power station to store oil and kerosene. The warehouse belonged to the war commissariat. Gradually the idea of rebuilding the factory gained ground. Around 1921–1922, the company received large investments for rebuilding and modernisation. The production of strong alcoholic drinks was still a monopoly, generating considerable income for the national budget.

=== Soviet occupation ===
Lithuania was occupied by the Soviets at the beginning of World War II and again from 1944. All factories and other businesses were nationalised. The factory continued to operate. In 1948, the Soviets decided to merge the Stumbras factory with the M. Velykis liquor factory, thus creating the largest alcohol producer in the Lithuanian SSR. In 1975, three local spirit producers in Atanavas, Balbieriškis and Šilutė were merged into the company and it became known as "Stumbras".

=== Independent Lithuania and privatisation ===
Stumbras was a state-owned company until 2003. UAB "Mineraliniai vandenys", a subsidiary of holding company MG Baltic, as of December 2008, owned 94.9% of the company's shares. After the privatisation, the company underwent management and organisational reforms, including the spinning off of the bioethanol plant in Šilutė. In 2006 and 2007, the company introduced several new vodka and brandy products. Increasing sales of these new products and growing exports resulted in significant growth in sales volume (47.3% in 2007) and net profits (51.4% in 2007). However, 2008, saw decreases in sales and profits with the share price dropping from near 14 litas at the end of 2007 to around 4 litas at the beginning of 2009.

In spring 2010, Stumbras started a project with the Lithuanian Institute of History to commemorate the 600th anniversary of Battle of Grunwald. The aim of the project is to create the biggest mock up model of the battle, which will be 20 sq. meters.

== Brands ==
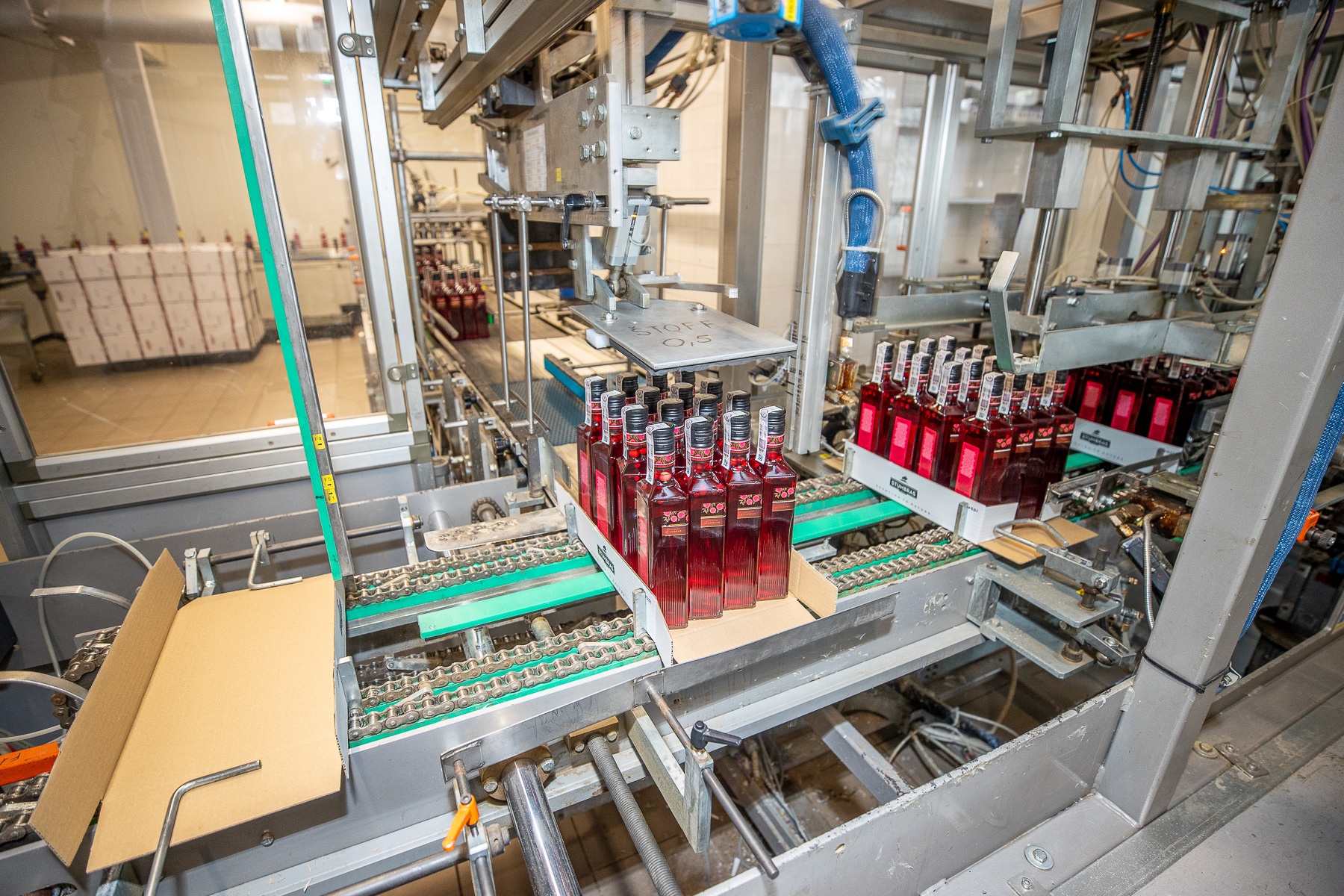
Stumbras production line

Stumbras produces a variety of drinks, including vodka, brandy, bitters and liqueurs.

== Awards ==
- "Prodexpo 2010" (Moscow, Russia) – bitter "999" was named "Prodexpo Star", "Lithuanian vodka" Gold received gold medal award
- "Wine & Spirits WSWA 2010" (Las Vegas, United States) – "Lithuanian vodka" Gold received silver medal award
- "Drinks International Vodka Challenge 2009" (United Kingdom) – "Lithuanian vodka" received silver medal award
- "Prodexpo 2008" (Moscow, Russia) – "Lithuanian vodka" Gold was named "Prodexpo Star"
- In 2007, liqueur "Krupnikas" and bitter "999" were included in the list of Lithuanian Culinary Heritage
- "Prodexpo 2007" (Moscow, Russia) – "Stumbro Šimtmečio" received gold medal award
- "San Francisco World Spirits Competition 2006" (San Francisco, USA) – bitter "999" received double gold medal award, "Lithuanian vodka" Original received gold medal award, "Lithuanian vodka" Gold received gold medal award
- "Beverage Testing Institute 2005" (Chicago, USA) – "Lithuanian vodka" Gold received gold medal award

== Stumbras museum ==
At the end of 2009, the Stumbras museum was opened in Kaunas. In the museum visitors can learn about the history and cultural context of alcohol consumption and production of strong alcoholic beverages in Lithuania, and also the history of the Stumbras factory: the century-old buildings, document archive and photos.
