= Loch Lomond distillery =

Whisky distillery in Alexandria, Scotland

Loch Lomond Distillery

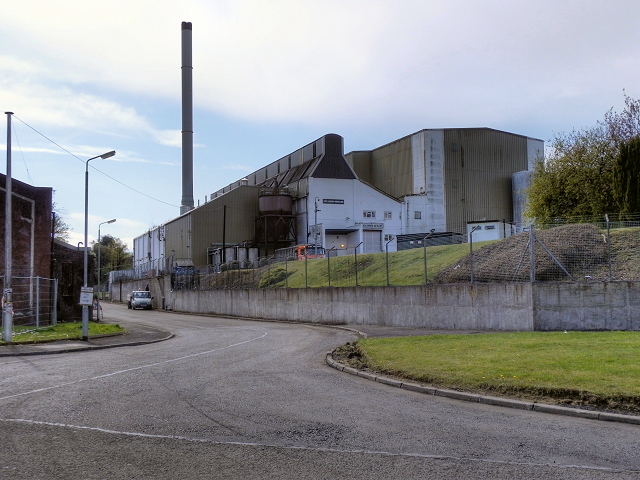
- Location: Lomond Estate, Alexandria G83 0TL, Scotland, United Kingdom
- Coordinates: 55.9923°N 4.5766°W
- Owner: Loch Lomond Distillery Company
- Founded: 1964; 62 years ago
- Status: Active
- Water source: Borehole
- No. of stills: 4 wash stills 4 spirit stills 3 column stills
- Capacity: 3,000,000 litres (malt) & 20,000,000 litres (grain)
- Website: www.lochlomondwhiskies.com

Loch Lomond is a Highland Single Malt Scotch whisky distillery in Alexandria, Scotland, near Loch Lomond.

== History ==
The first site of the former Loch Lomond Distillery dates back to 1814, sited at the north end of Loch Lomond near Tarbet. The present business was established in 1964 by the former owners of the Littlemill Distillery in Bowling. Production began in Loch Lomond the following year in 1965. In 1984, the distillery stopped production until Glen Catrine Bonded Warehouses acquired the business and resumed malt production in 1987. Grain whisky production began in 1993 and two new malt stills were added in 1999. At the time the Grain distillery opened in 1994, it was the only distillery in Scotland producing both Grain and Malt whisky. It also operates a unique set-up of three sets of stills.

In 2014, the distillery was acquired in a Management Buy In led by CEO Colin Matthews alongside the London based private equity group Exponent.

In June 2019 the business was acquired in a secondary LBO, again led by CEO Colin Matthews and the management team with financial backing on this occasion coming from the Asian buyout fund Hillhouse Capital.

== Products ==
In 2020, Loch Lomond rebranded their products, the new range includes:

- Loch Lomond Original – Single Malt Whisky (40% ABV)
- Loch Lomond Single Malt 12 Years Old (46% ABV)
- Loch Lomond Inchmoan Single Malt 12 Years Old (46% ABV)
- Loch Lomond Inchmurrin Single Malt 12 Years Old (46% ABV)
- Loch Lomond Single Malt 14 Years Old (46% ABV)
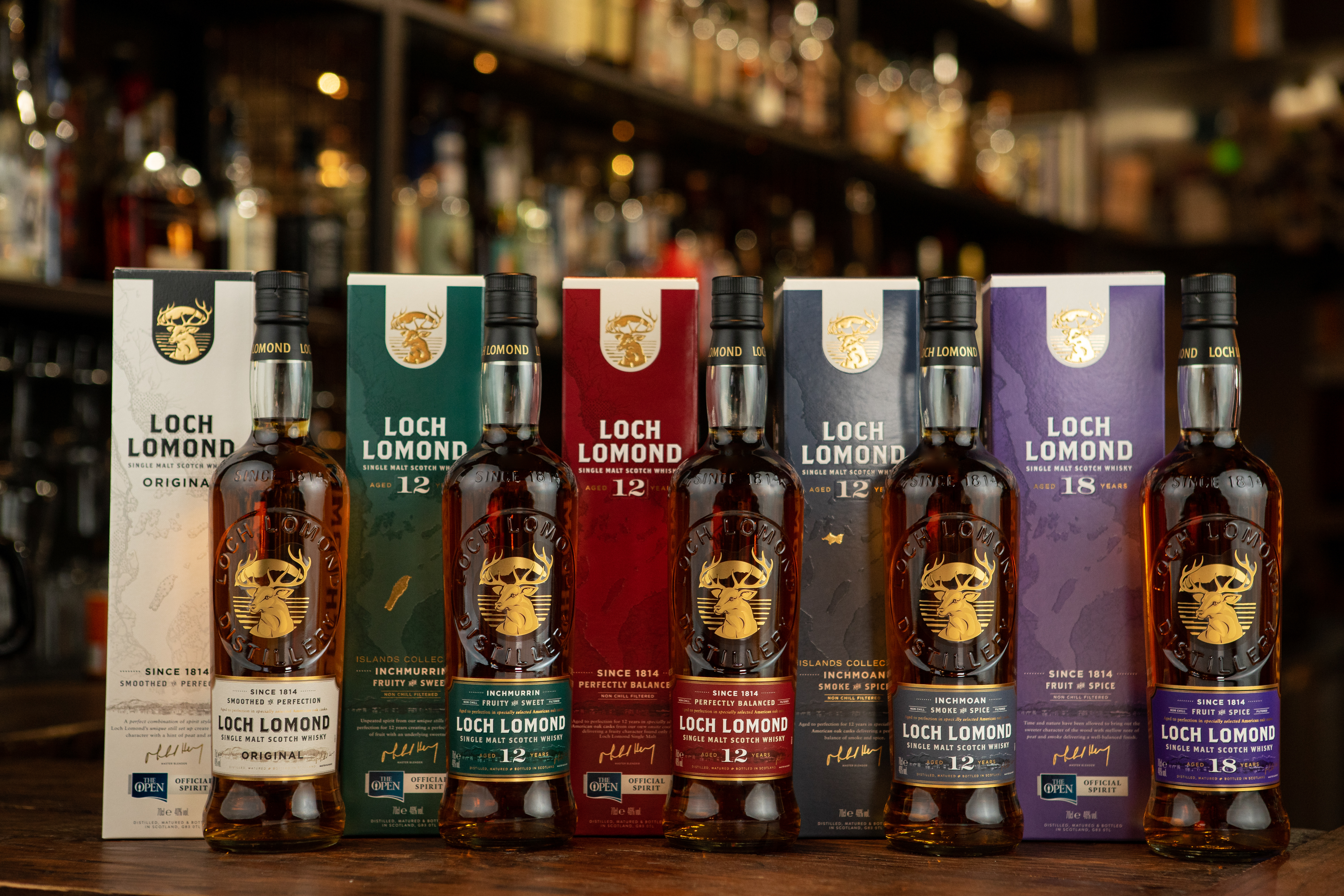
  Refreshed Range 2020
- Loch Lomond Single Malt 18 Years Old (46% ABV)
- Loch Lomond Single Malt 21 Years Old (46% ABV)
- Loch Lomond Single Malt 30 Years Old (47% ABV)
- Loch Lomond Single Grain Scotch Whisky (46% ABV)
- Loch Lomond Single Grain Peated Scotch Whisky (46% ABV)
- Loch Lomond Reserve – Premium Blended Scotch Whisky (40% ABV)
- Loch Lomond Signature – Deluxe Blended Scotch Whisky (40% ABV)

In addition the company owns Glen's Vodka, among other non-Loch Lomond brands.

== Equipment ==
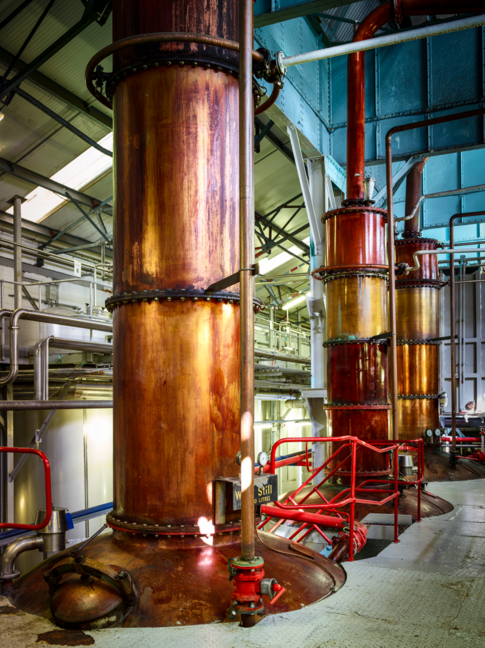
Loch Lomond Distillery stills

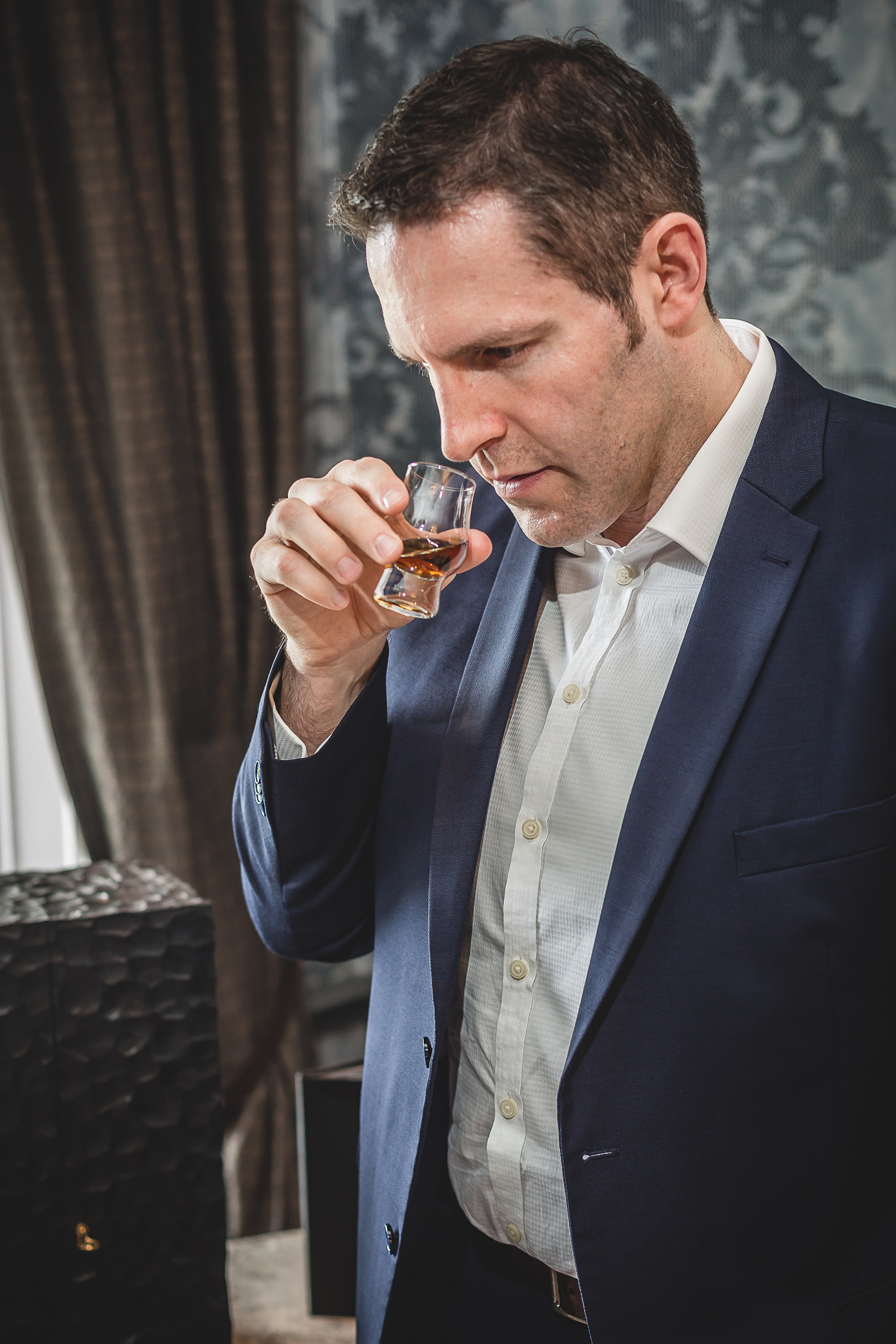
Master Blender, Michael Henry

The former owner of Littlemill Distillery, Duncan Barton, developed the current site for the Loch Lomond Distillery. He brought innovative pot malt stills which rest in the cylindrical necks of the spirit stills. Traditionally the necks of malt stills are open. The Loch Lomond stills include special distillation trays in the necks, allowing for greater contact with the cooling alcohol vapour, said to make the process more efficient. These stills can produce alcohol up to 90% ABV where normal stills deliver the alcohol at around 70% ABV. This style of still allows for different "flavour notes" to be captured and emphasised through the range of alcohol strengths that can be captured and rejected. This is much more difficult to achieve through a conventional pot still.

== Sponsorship ==
Loch Lomond Whiskies are currently the official spirit of The Open. They have a five-year partnership with the Open, golf's original Championship. As part of the partnership with The Open, Loch Lomond Whiskies have released a variety of golf limited editions.

In 2020, the announced a 3 year global partnership & sponsorship agreement with the Pro14. They are now the Official Spirit of PRO14 Rugby and as part of the partnership Loch Lomond Whiskies will showcase its whiskies at match venues and digitally throughout the season.

From 2021 onwards the distillery have sponsored Wigan Warriors rugby league team in the Super League.

== Awards ==
Loch Lomond's whiskies have been recognised in many renowned award ceremonies, such as San Francisco World Spirits Awards, International Wine & Spirits Competition, World Whisky Awards, International Spirits Challenge & The Scotch Whisky Masters. Some of the key award received include:

Loch Lomond	Awards Received		
Original	Gold Medal - Scotch Whisky Masters 2020	Gold Medal - San Francisco World Spirit Awards 2018	Gold Medal - International Spirits Challenge 2020
12 Year Old	Platinum Medal - San Francisco World Spirit Awards 2020	Double Gold Medal - San Francisco World Spirit Awards 2020	Gold Medal - Scotch Whisky Masters 2020
Inchmurrin 12 Year Old	Double Gold Medal - San Francisco World Spirit Awards 2020	Gold Medal - International Spirits Challenge 2020	Gold Medal - World Whisky Awards 2016
Inchmoan 12 Year Old	Gold Medal - San Francisco World Spirit Awards 2020	Gold Medal - International Spirits Challenge 2020	Best Highland Malt 12 & Under - World Whisky Awards 2018
18 Year Old	Double Gold Medal - San Francisco World Spirit Awards 2020	Gold Medal - International Spirits Challenge 2020	Gold Medal - Scotch Whisky Masters 2020
Single Grain	Double Gold Medal - San Francisco World Spirit Awards 2017	Best Scotch Grain - World Whisky Awards 2017	Gold Medal - Berlin International Spirits Competition 2017

== Investment ==
More new stills were installed in 2016 and grain whisky, single malt whisky and single grain whisky as well as blended whisky can now be made on the same premises. The bottling plant at Glen Catrine in Ayrshire is one of the biggest and currently produces more than 65 million bottles of whisky and other spirits each year.

== Fictional depiction ==
"Loch Lomond" is also the name of a fictional brand of Scotch whisky consumed by Captain Haddock in Hergé's famous comics series The Adventures of Tintin. Despite the name, the whisky has no connection to the real-world Loch Lomond distillery. It was first mentioned in the 1966 English-language edition of Tintin and the Black Island (replacing Johnnie Walker in the original), although it remains ambiguous whether or not Hergé came up with the name on his own.
