= Youri Dolgoruki Vodka =

Brand of Russian vodka

Youri Dolgoruki Vodka is a Russian vodka, named after Duke Dolgoruki, the founder of Moscow.

== Product ==
Youri Dolgoruki vodka is sold in a frosted-glass bottle, with an image of St. Basil's Cathedral visible on the back of the bottle through a see-through window in the packaging, along with an image of Yuri Dolgorukiy, who founded Moscow in the 12th century.
