= Savvy Vodka =

American vodka brand

SAVVY Vodka
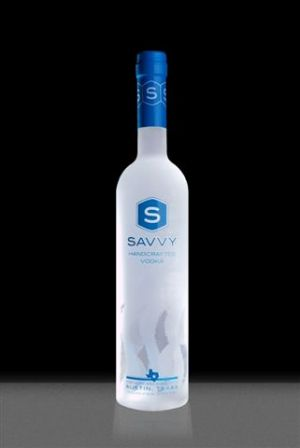
- SAVVY Vodka
- Type: Vodka
- Manufacturer: Savvy Distillers, LP
- Origin: Austin, Texas United States
- Introduced: 2007
- Proof (US): 40% Alc/Vol

SAVVY Vodka is a vodka produced by Savvy Distillers, LP. Founded by Chad Auler, SAVVY Vodka was established in 2006 in Austin, Texas. They specialize in "handcrafted" vodka, produced in a micro-distillery also located in Austin, Texas. Their products are only available in the state of Texas.

== Process ==
The vodka is distilled from grain grown in Texas, and the quantity produced is limited to only 400 gallons at a time. This is also the basis on which they refer to their product as "handcrafted" due to the reasonably smaller batches produced. They use a column still in which is the equivalent of distilling their spirits 20 times per batch. This is compared to a traditional pot still which some consider producing a less clean or less pure product. The column still used also allows them to produce their product more efficiently at a fraction of the energy typically used in similar processes. It is estimated to be 200% more efficient than a traditional pot still. In addition to its low energy use, the water used in the distillation is recycled between a custom two-tank water reclamation system. This allows them to reuse the 3,000 gallons of water for multiple batches instead of wasting more with each distillation process. The water used comes from a spring-fed creek that flows through the Fall Creek Ranch, owned by the Auler family.
