= Isensua =

British vodka company

Isensua is a UK vodka firm that produces a range of vodkas and PPS beverages in the United Kingdom, as well as being the European importer for Russian Standard Vodka. The firm is also known for producing a vodka called Opium on the British market.

== Range ==
- Isensua Vodka
- Isensua Opium
- Isensua VX Concord Grape and Passion Fruit (PPS)
- Isensua VX White Cranberry and Lychee (PPS)
- Isensua VX Dragon Fruit and Guava (PPS)
