= VKA Vodka =

Italian vodka brand

VKA Tuscan Organic Vodka
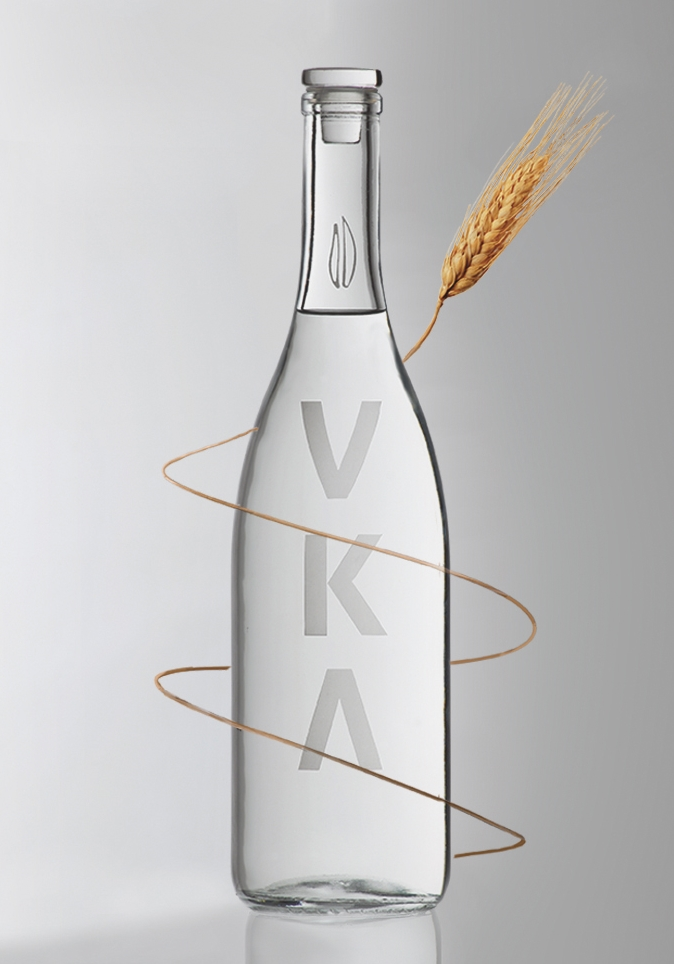
- VKA 750 mL bottle
- Type: Vodka
- Manufacturer: Futa s.r.l.
- Country of origin: Italy
- Introduced: 2013 in Italy
- Alcohol by volume: 40.0%
- Proof (US): 80
- Colour: Crystal transparent
- Flavour: Fresh wheat and a hint of juniper, a mineral texture with a silky alcoholic perception and a cool acidity in the finish
- Ingredients: Italian organic wheat and spelt, water from the Tuscan Apennines
- Variants: Organic
- Related products: List of vodkas
- Website: vka.it

VKA is a premium brand vodka produced in Italy from organic wheat and spelt and Tuscan Apennines water. It was founded in 2013 by a group of entrepreneurs in Mugello, gathered around the name of Futa Pass. The Maître de Chai for VKA is Luca Pecorini a renowned restaurant owner, who developed the original recipe for the vodka in Barberino di Mugello. It is distributed in Asia, the Czech Republic and Italy.

== Product description ==
Soft organic wheat and spelt used in the creation of VKA are grown in Tuscany, Italy from sustainable agriculture. Distilled in the same region with four double-effect continuous vacuum columns, the distillate is then sent to Firenzuola, north of Florence, where it is blended with filtered Mugello mountain spring water, and bottled in a Tuscan-style transparent glass bottle. The packaging has the same essential style and attention to eco-compatibility and organic materials.

The letter A in the logo is written as an upside-down V, so the Greek letter lambda (Λ) is sometimes used as a replacement: VKΛ.
