= Narodnoye =

Narodnoye Народное
- Selo
- Location within Voronezh Oblast Location within Russia
- Coordinates: 51°34′N 41°53′E
- Country: Russia
- Region: Voronezh Oblast
- District: Ternovsky District
- Time zone: UTC+3:00

Narodnoye (Russian: Народное) is a rural locality (a selo) and the administrative center of Narodnenskoye Rural Settlement, Ternovsky District, Voronezh Oblast, Russia. The population was 1,153 as of 2010. There are 19 streets.

== Geography ==
Narodnoye is located on the Sukhoy Karachan River, 25 km southeast of Ternovka (the district's administrative centre) by road. Popovka is the nearest rural locality.
