= Khlibnyi Dar =

Ukrainian vodka brand

Хлібний Дар
- A 700 ml bottle of Хлібний Дар
- Type: Vodka
- Manufacturer: National Horilka Company
- Origin: Ukraine
- Introduced: 2002
- Alcohol by volume: 40%
- Proof (US): 80
- Related products: List of vodkas
- Website: bayaderagroup.com/en/catalogue/vodka/khlibnyi-dar

Khlibnyi Dar (Ukrainian: Хлібний Дар, literally "Bread Gift"), also transliterated as Hlibny Dar, is a brand of horilka (Ukrainian vodka), first introduced to the market in 2002. It is owned by the Bayadera Group (Ukrainian: Баядера Груп), produced in a factory of the National Horilka Company (Ukrainian: Національна горілчана компанія) in the village of Stepanky (Ukrainian: Степанки) in the Cherkasy Oblast of Ukraine. All products from the Khlibnyi Dar range are made through the distillation of fermented cereal grains, which is the most popular ingredient for making vodka in the Polish and Ukrainian tradition. According to The Millionaires’ Club report, Khlibnyi Dar was the third-best-selling brand of vodka in the world in 2011.

== Variants ==
The original recipe from the Khlibnyi Dar brand comes in 1.75, 1, 0.7, 0.5, 0.37, 0.2 and 0.1 litre bottles, though this varies with each flavour. All types of this horilka are pure vodka made from cereal grains, but some come with small additions or differences in production that change the taste slightly. In total, there are six varieties of this distilled beverage:

- Хлібний Дар (Класична) - Khlibnyi Dar (Classic); the original and most popular type, made from wheat, rye and barley
- Хлібний Дар (Пшенична) - Khlibnyi Dar (Wheat); made from wheat and artesian water
- Хлібний Дар (на пророщеному зерні) - Khlibnyi Dar (on sprouted grain); uses extracts of germinated seeds
- Хлібний Дар (Житня Люкс) - Khlibnyi Dar (Rye Luxury); made from rye crackers, cinnamon and cumin
- Хлібний Дар (Озима) - Khlibnyi Dar (Winter); uses winter wheat grain
- Хлібний Дар (Українська) - Khlibnyi Dar (Ukrainian); made from an infusion of wheat crackers

== See also ==
- List of vodkas
