= V44 (vodka) =

Brand of vodka

- Type: Vodka
- Manufacturer: ESL
- Origin: Lithuania
- Introduced: 2009
- Alcohol by volume: 44%
- Related products: List of vodkas

V44 is a brand of pure super premium wheat-vodka produced by the Bratislava-based company European Spirits and Liquor. Its name comes from numbers of sample variations. The basic vodka recipe is from a 1405 Baltic document, and is claimed to be the world's oldest officially registered surviving vodka recipe. V44 is 100% unflavoured. Its taste and consistency is mainly achieved by using a special type of bio wheat, a proprietary fermentation process and by the cold gravity filtration processes. The production volume each year is limited to the available specified wheat. V44 Vodka is 44% alcohol and kosher certified.
