= Magic Spirits =

German producer of various vodka brands

MAGIC SPIRITS is a German producer of various vodka brands.

Beginning in 1991 sales of Magic Crystal vodka increases up to 13,5 mio. bottles per year. Magic Crystal vodka is produced in 37,5% vol. (75 proof) and 40,0% vol. (80 proof). Further there is Black Magic vodka with 56% vol. (112 proof) which is a winner of a silver medal at the International Wine and Spirit Competition 2005 in London. Additional there is vodka Magic 78 with 156 proof and Magic Crystal Citrus vodka.
