= Gold Symphony Vodka =

Brand of Russian vodka

Gold Symphony (Russian: "Zolotaya simphonia" (Золотая симфония)) is a Russian vodka with added gold leaves, 23 carats (96%). It is composed of double-filtered, de-mineralized water, rectified ethyl alcohol (Luxe), natural honey, oat-flakes liqueur, yeast-free wheat-bread liqueur, and golden leaf.
