= Orloff vodka =

American brand of alcohol

Orloff vodka is made by White Rock Distilleries of Lewiston, Maine. It is made in 80 or 100 proof and is distilled on Wheat.

This is not to be confused with the Orloff brand of vodka, previously sold worldwide by Seagram and still available in Brazil by Pernod Ricard.
