= Zaranoff =

Brand of vodka

Zaranoff is a brand of vodka, sold mainly by ALDI in Germany, Belgium Slovenia and Denmark. It is manufactured by a company called Rückforth GMBH in Rottenburg. When tested by Swedish authorities, while performing tests on illegally imported alcohol, Zaranoff proved to have a higher than stated content of alcohol, up to 55%-alc.
