= Kors Vodka =

Vodka brand

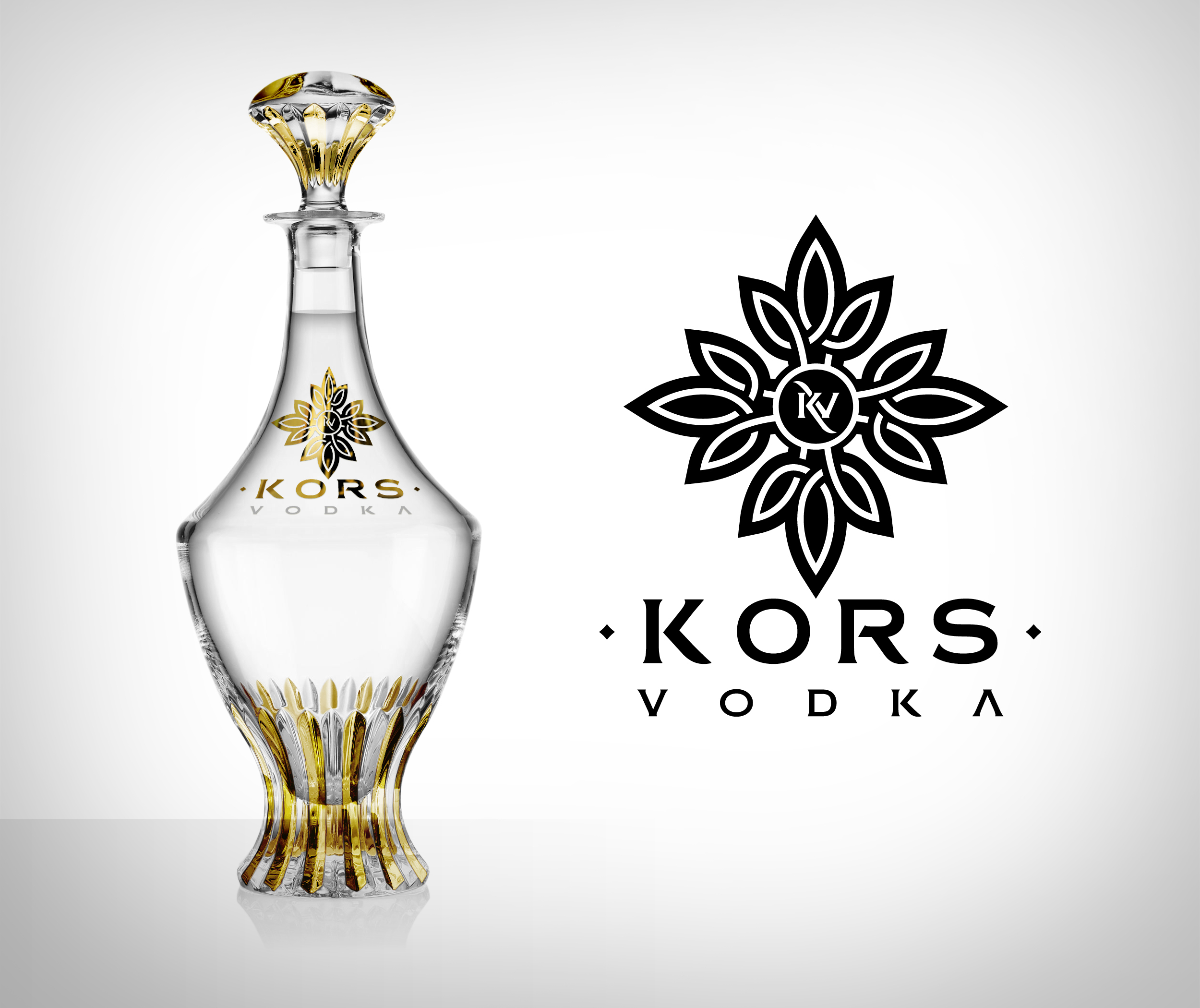
Kors Vodka bottle and Kors logo

Kors Vodka is a vodka brand founded by Mitja Krzisnik. Kors Vodka is produced using water from the Italian Alps and grains from 12 European countries, and is distilled using gold and diamond distillation techniques. The recipe for this vodka comes from a batch of vodka found in Finland, which was believed to be lost for over a century. This batch was a shipment sent from the last Tzar of Russia Nikolai II to George V of the United Kingdom.

The prices of the bottles range from $12,500 to $24,500. Kors is considered to be one of the most expensive vodkas on the market.

== Production ==
Kors Vodka only produces a few thousand bottles each year. The bottles are made from crystal with silver, gold and platinum decorations. Vodka is distilled using a diamond and gold tube filtration technique, spring water from the Italian Alps and is presented in a polished walnut box with velvet and silk interior.
