= Pittsburgh Whiskey & Fine Spirits Festival =

- Frequency: Annual
- Inaugurated: 2007
- Organiser: Pittsburgh Wine Festival LLC
- Website: www.pittsburghwhiskeyfestival.com

The Pittsburgh Whiskey & Fine Spirits Festival is an annual festival celebrating whiskey and spirits in Pittsburgh, Pennsylvania. The festival is sponsored by the Pennsylvania Liquor Control Board. Contributions to the event benefit the National Multiple Sclerosis Society. The Pittsburgh festival follows a similar one in Philadelphia. The creation of the festival follows the success of the Pittsburgh Wine Festival. It was conceived as an "experiential marketplace for spirits." It was founded in 2007, amid growth in whiskey's popularity.

The inaugural event in 2007 focused on featuring whiskeys, ryes and vodkas, which are meant to be consumed "neat." The theme was the Whiskey Rebellion, an important event in Western Pennsylvania history, with information on the history of ryes and whiskeys. In 2008, the offerings were expanded to include cocktails, That year, the sponsors sought to reach the female demographic. The 2009 event sought to reach an even broader audience, especially younger individuals. The 2010 event had a speakeasy decor, with a new focus on cigars.

For the first time, the 2011 edition, which had a Mad Men theme, sold out all tickets prior to the beginning of the event. Wigle Whiskey, a new Pittsburgh distillery, was to have been featured, but federal authorities had not yet approved the brand's label design. The "Adult Chocolate Milk" specialty drink was well received.

== See also ==
- Philadelphia Whiskey Festival
