= Rihards Dubra =

Latvian composer

Rihards Dubra (born 28 February 1964 in Riga, Latvian SSR, Soviet Union) is a Latvian composer. Many of his works are religiously influenced, including a Te Deum and an Alma Redemptoris Mater for soprano saxophone, choir, and organ.

Rihards Dubra was commissioned by Louth Contemporary Music Society (County Louth, Ireland) to write his first choral piece in English based on the words of 'Hail Holy Queen'. The world première was given by the State Choir Latvija in February 2008 in St.Patrick's Cathedral Church, Dundalk.

== Recordings ==
The Royal Holloway Choir (Rupert Gough, conductor) has recorded a CD of Dubra's sacred choral compositions entitled "Hail Queen of Heaven & other choral works," released on Hyperion Records (CDA67799), which includes the following:

- 'Oculus non vidit'
- 'Ave Maria III'
- 'Miserere mei'
- 'Hail, Queen of Heaven'
- 'Duo Seraphim'
- 'Felix namque es …'
- 'Stetit Angelus'
- 'Gloria Patri'
- 'Missa de Spiritu Sancto'
- 'Ubi caritas'
- 'Ave Maria I'

The Cambridge Chorale (Michael Kibblewhite, conductor) has recorded another CD of his sacred choral works entitled "Northern Lights: Music of Rihards Dubra," released on Meridian Records (CDE 84408), which includes the following:

- 'Quam benignus es'
- 'Pater noster'
- 'Visio remissionis' (featuring Mike Hall, soprano saxophone)
- 'Eripe me'
- 'Alma redemptoris mater' (featuring Julian Wilkins, organ)
- 'Panis angelicus'
- 'Oratio' (featuring Mike Hall, soprano saxophone)
- 'O crux ave'
- 'Veni Sancte Spiritus'
