= Kubanskaya =

Brand of Russian vodka

Kubanskaya is a Russian flavoured brand of vodka or nastoyka with a lemon flavour.

Kubanskaya was popular among expatriates living in Moscow during the 1990s. The 1998 Russian financial crisis triggered an exodus of the Moscow expatriates, and Kristall ceased production.

The vodka was mentioned in the novel Moscow-Petushki, and a song by the Zelenograd rock group NTO Retsept was called "Kubanskaya".
