= Pyatizvyozdnaya =

Brand of Russian vodka

Pyatizvyozdnaya (Russian пятизвёздная: "with five stars" (the highest grade in the school)) is a Russian vodka produced by the Saint Petersburg based distillery LIVIZ.
