= Kauffman Vodka =

Kauffman Vodka is a Russian brand of vodka produced in Moscow, Russia by the WH Import Company, an import and wholesale company of alcohol in Russia. Introduced in 2000 by Dr. Mark Kauffman, Kauffman Vodka is produced in limited quantities.

Kauffman Vodka is produced from the wheat of a single harvest; thus, it has a specific vintage. It is produced only during specific vintage years, based on the quality of the wheat available.
