= Anthony Dias Blue =

American author and columnist (1942–2023)

- Born: January 5, 1941; Larchmont, New York, U.S.
- Died: December 25, 2023 (aged 82); Los Angeles, California, U.S.
- Education: Amherst College
- Occupations: Author, editor, columnist, television personality
- Spouse: Kathryn Koshland (m. 1967)
- Children: 4

Anthony Dias Blue (January 5, 1941 – December 25, 2023) was an American author, columnist, television and radio personality and the owner of a food and wine event company in Los Angeles, California.

== Life ==
Anthony Dias Blue was born to Gertrud and Sidney Blue in Larchmont, New York on January 5, 1941, Blue attended Riverdale Country School and Amherst College, married Kathryn Koshland in 1967, had four children, and in 1978, moved to San Francisco.

== Career ==
In 1978, Blue became West Coast Editor of Food & Wine magazine.

In 1980, Blue became Wine and Spirits Editor of Bon Appétit Magazine, a position he held for 26 years. He also wrote a weekly syndicated wine column that appeared in the Bay Area, first in the San Francisco Chronicle, and then in the San Jose Mercury News.

For ten years, Blue wrote and edited the Zagat Guide for northern California for his friend Tim Zagat, with whom he attended Riverdale.

Blue had a long-running feature spot on WCBS radio in New York City. The subject of the feature was restaurant reviews and lifestyle subjects, mostly associated with food. Later the program was expanded to include reporting about wine. Now called the Blue Lifestyle Minute, the feature has been on every day for more than 30 years (except for the two weeks following 9/11). Blue received a James Beard Award for the Minute in 2001.

A separate, localized version of The Blue Lifestyle Minute began airing in 1999 on KFWB in Los Angeles. In 2009, this feature moved to KABC along with the addition of a new weekend show called "The Taste Buds" co-hosted with Meridith May and Merrill Schindler.

In 2014, Blue left KABC, and moved The Blue Lifestyle Minute to KNX (AM) 1070. This brought Blue's listenership to over 200,000.

=== Reality television ===
In 2001, Blue was the color commentator on the short-lived reality television series Iron Chef USA.

=== The Tasting Panel ===
In 2007, in partnership with Publisher Meridith May, Blue purchased Patterson's Beverage Journal, a 65-year-old beverage trade publication that was renamed The Tasting Panel. It has become the highest-circulation beverage industry publication.

=== The Sommelier Journal ===
In December 2013, The Tasting Panel acquired The Sommelier Journal with Blue as the new Editor-in-Chief along with a team of top wine and hospitality industry writers. The first issue of the refreshed publication was distributed in Spring of 2014.

=== Blue Lifestyle ===
Blue ran the producers of wine and food events, creating large trade tastings, wine seminars, lunches, and dinners for wineries and wine associations around the world.

=== San Francisco Competitions ===
In 2000, Blue launched the San Francisco World Spirits Competition, which has become the second largest spirits competition in the world. It is the biggest in the United States, with more than 2500 entries in 2017.

Blue acquired the San Francisco International Wine Competition, the largest international wine competition in the US (nearly 4,500 wines entered in 2017).

== Death ==
Anthony Dias Blue died in Los Angeles on December 25, 2023, at the age of 82.

== Bibliography ==
Blue wrote nine books, including American Wine, The Complete Book of Mixed Drinks, The Complete Book of Spirits, and Anthony Dias Blue's Pocket Guide to Wine. With his wife, Kathryn Blue, he also authored two cookbooks, Thanksgiving Dinner and America's Kitchen.

In 1991, Blue's "Wine Guide" and "European Restaurant Guide" databases were prepared on proprietary add-on memory cards for Casio electronic organizers by Lifestyle Software Group (now MenuMax, LLC, subsidiary of Ben E. Keith Company).

== Accolades ==
In 1988, Blue was selected for the James Beard Who's Who in Food Award, in 2000 he was nominated for a James Beard Award as "Wine & Spirits Personality of the Year". He won the 1997 Communicator of the Year Award from the International Wine & Spirits Competition in London. In 2001 he was awarded a James Beard Award for The Blue Lifestyle Minute.
