= Narodnaya =

Brand of Russian vodka

Narodnaya (Russian: Народная, lit. folk) is a brand of Russian vodka that was scheduled to be produced in different flavours (grain, wheat, rye, cedar and malty) by Rosspirtprom, a federal public enterprise, in 2007 to avoid repeating the local vodka substitute poisonings of 2006. The vodka was scheduled to cost about 60 Russian rubles (₽) (US$2.24 at the time) by retail and ₽53 ($1.98 at the time) wholesale for a half litre.
