= Dubra (vodka) =

Brand of vodka

A plastic 1.75L Dubra bottle

Dubra is a brand of vodka distributed in the United States. Its low price has made the brand popular among college students. It is found in the New England state of Connecticut and the Mid-Atlantic states.

Although the brand is manufactured and bottled in the United States, Dubra utilizes a Slavic name. Dubra is distributed in a plastic bottle, which ensures the safety of the beverage during transport.
