= Spirit Journal =

Spirit Journal official logo

The Spirit Journal: The Independent Guide to Distilled Spirits, Beer, and Fortified Wines, established in 1984, was a quarterly newsletter published in the United States that presents information about alcoholic beverages. It began to be published and edited by F. Paul Pacult in 1991. It is named as F. Paul Pacult’s Spirit Journal. The newsletter ceased publication with the December 2018 issue.

The author, F. Paul Pacult, is America's foremost expert on distilled spirits.

The no-advertising policy and strict evaluation methods ensured unbiased opinions, professional appraisals that were guided solely by product quality, tasting format, and expertise rather than price or reputation.

The Spirit Journal was the most trusted newsletter on spirits, wine, and beer in America. Published quarterly, it did not accept advertising and, as such, renders unbiased reviews and ratings that were considered the gold standard within the alcoholic beverage industry. According to the newsletter's website, it is "the world's most quoted publication on spirits, beer, and fortified wines."
