= Minsk Kristall =

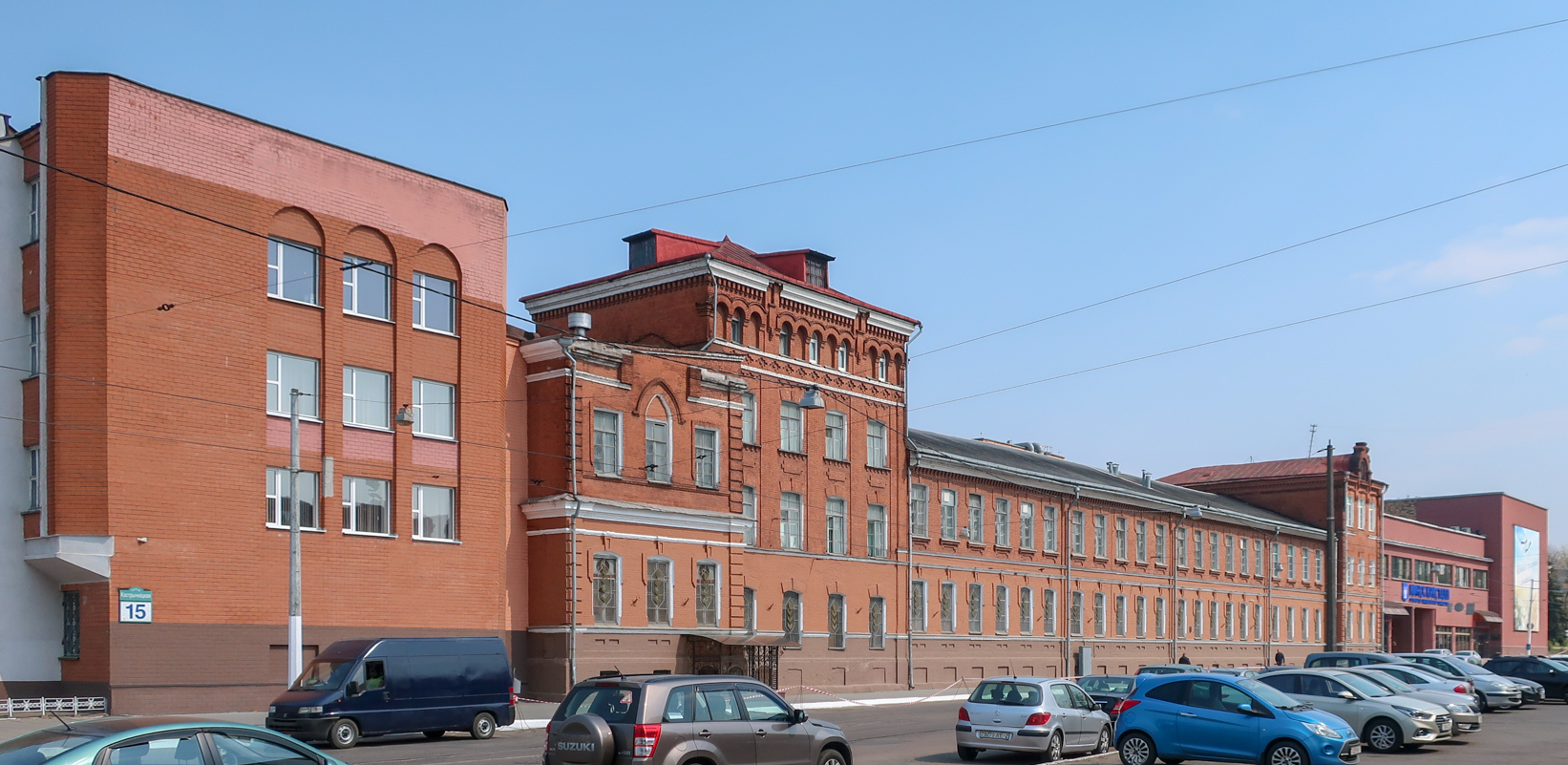
Minsk Kristall main building

Minsk Kristall (Minsk Kryshtal, Belarusian: Мінск Крышталь, Russian: Минск Кристалл) is a distillery in Belarus.

The company based in Minsk was founded by brothers Yankel Rakaushchyk and Zelman Rakaushchyk in 1893. During the Russian Civil War the distillery was nationalized by the Russian Bolsheviks and used as warehouses. In 1924 the Soviet Union government allowed production of spirits and the former Rakaushchyk Brothers distillery was activated again.

The distillery is controlled by the Government of Belarus. Its products include Minsk Vodka, Belaya Rus vodka, and Kryshtal Etalon.
