= Beverage Testing Institute =

Marketing service company

Founded in 1981, the Beverage Testing Institute (BTI) is a marketing service company that provides reviews for spirits, wines, and beers. Based in Chicago, Illinois, the company evaluates submissions on a rolling basis throughout the calendar year. It uses numerical scores and publishes books of its test results.

The company's beer marketing program, the World Beer Championships, was founded in 1994.

== Reviews ==
The company rates spirits, wines and beers. It does not accept advertising from any company that submits their products for review. The judging ratings range from 96 to 100 for superlative to 80 and below for not recommended. Jerald O’Kennard, Director of the Beverage Testing Institute, said that 94 is an extremely good score, and unusually high. They use a tasting lab in Chicago. Testing methods minimize external factors and maximize the concentration of the panelist. All of the panelists are professional guest tasters who are retailers, restaurateurs, or prominent writers.

The company claims that what sets BTI apart is its science-backed blind-tasting methodology, developed in partnership with Cornell University. Unlike most spirits competition and rating services, BTI evaluates submissions on a rolling basis throughout the calendar year. After being scored out of 100, the submissions are placed onto a leaderboard that can shift at any moment as new submissions are evaluated.

== Books ==
The company published the book Beverage Testing Institute's Buying Guide to Beer. The book is a guide to beers throughout the world. The breweries and brands are arranged in alphabetical order according to geographic location. There are also notes on the appearance, aroma, and taste for every beer that is rated and there is information on beer styles. The company also published the book Buying Guide to Imported Wines. The book has evaluations of styles, vintages, and producers cover 2,500 wines from 22 countries in Europe, Latin America, Africa, and Russia. The best-scoring wines are categorized by name, region, description, and price.

== Scores and Medals ==
BTI employs a 100-point scale. Products with scores above 80 are re-tasted to confirm consistency, with final rating determined by panel consensus. Only products above 80 points are published; scores below 80 points are privately shared with producers.

Products above 80 points are awarded medals in the following tiers.

BTI Medal Scoring System
Medal	Points	Recommendation
Platinum	96-100	Superlative
Gold	90-95	Exceptional
Silver	85-89	Highly Recommended
Bronze	80-84	Recommended

Additional recommendations include:

- Best Buy—Wines or spirits that provide uncommon value.
- Cellar Selection—This is a wine that they believe will improve significantly with at least three to five years of age.

== See also ==
- Spirits ratings
- Blind tasting
- Court of Master Sommeliers
