= Pemberton Distillery =

Distillery in British Columbia, Canada

Coordinates: 50°18′56.2″N 122°43′33.4″W

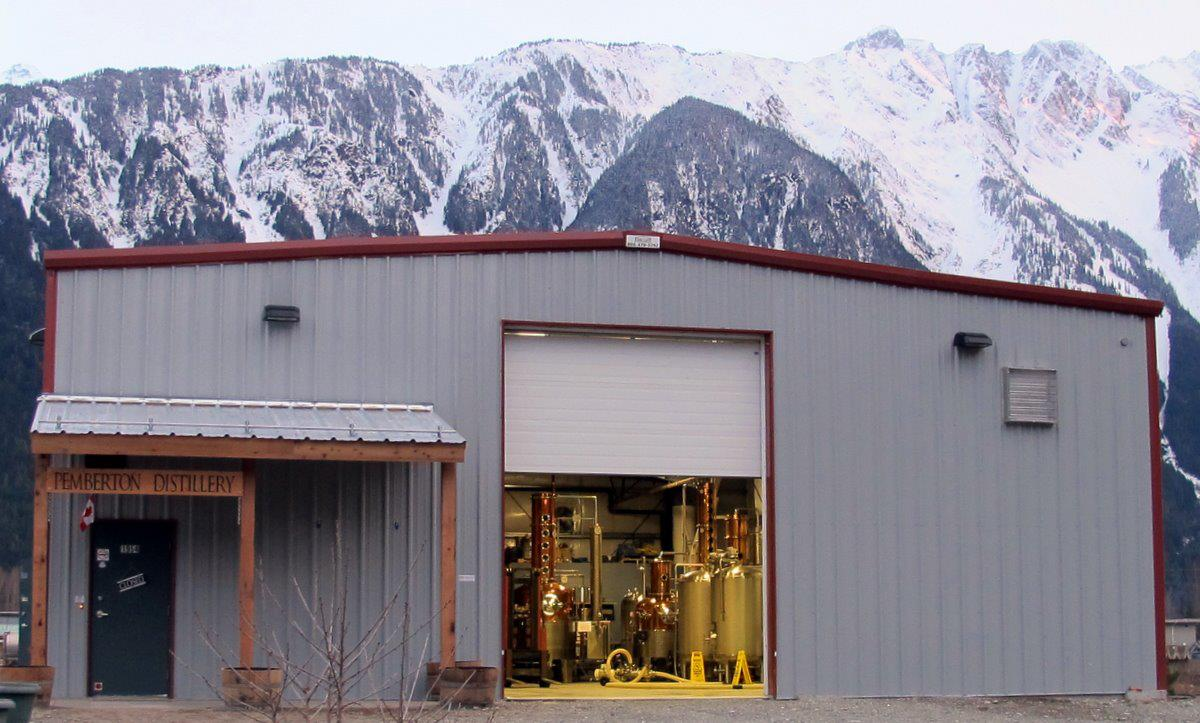

Region: British Columbia, Canada
- Location: Pemberton, British Columbia
- Owner: Schramm Family
- Founded: 2009
- Founder: Tyler Schramm
- Status: Closed
- Water source: Birkenhead River
- No. of stills: 2
- Capacity: 1000 litres / 500 litres
- Website: http://www.pembertondistillery.ca

Schramm Organic Potato Vodka
- Type: Vodka
- ABV: 40

Schramm Organic Gin
- Type: Gin
- ABV: 44.8
- Characteristics: London Dry style

Bourbon Barrel Aged Apple Brandy
- Type: Brandy
- Age(s): 5 Months
- Cask type(s): Ex-Bourbon, American Oak
- ABV: 40.0

Organic Single Malt Whisky
- Type: Single malt whisky
- Age(s): Cask filled 2012
- Cask type(s): Ex-Bourbon, American Oak
- ABV: 44.0
- Characteristics: Lightly Peated

Pemberton Distillery was a craft distillery located in Pemberton, British Columbia. The Pemberton Valley, which has sometimes been referred to as "Spud Valley", is known in the potato industry for its seed potatoes. Pemberton Distillery used potatoes to make some of its distilled beverages. Its product brand names include Schramm Vodka, Schramm Gin, Pemberton Distillery Single Malt Whisky and Pemberton Distillery Bourbon Barrel Aged Apple Brandy. It is now closed.

== History ==
Started in June 2009 by Tyler and Lorien Schramm, Pemberton Distillery is small craft distillery focused on using locally grown ingredients to produce spirits with terroir. The distillery was constructed by Tyler, Jonathan and Jake Schramm through the fall/winter of 2008 finishing in May 2009.

Tyler Schramm, Pemberton's owner and master distiller, completed a master's degree in brewing and distilling at Heriot-Watt University in Scotland.

== Distillery and products ==
The distillery includes one mash tun, three 1000 litre fermentation vessels and two copper pot stills (1000 litre and 500 litres).

Schramm Vodka and Schramm Gin are both based on spirit produced from organic Pemberton potatoes. Pemberton Distillery Single Malt Whisky is produced from organic pale malted barley, malted in British Columbia, and the lightly peated version incorporates a small portion of Scottish peated malt. Pemberton Distillery Apple Brandy is produced using locally grown apples coming for orchards in Pemberton, Birken and Lillooet. All products are entirely produced on site including the mashing, fermentation, distillation and bottling.

Pemberton Distillery is one of only a few distilleries in the world to produce an entire line of certified organic spirits.

== Awards ==
- Schramm Organic Vodka
  - Double Gold, World Spirits Awards, 2010
  - Spirit of the Year, World Spirits Awards, 2010
