= San Francisco World Spirits Competition =

American liquor contest

The San Francisco World Spirits Competition was founded in 2001 by Anthony Dias Blue as an off-shoot of the San Francisco International Wine Competition. It assesses hundreds of entrants annually (1,407 in 2013 from 63 countries) with tastings involving panels of expert judges selected each year from the spirits industry including mixologists, spirits buyers, and media from across the United States. Producers must submit their product for the competition and pay a fee ($475 for 2013) for its evaluation. Not all entries are given awards (those not judged of sufficient quality are not given an award) but most receive a bronze, silver, or gold award from the tasting panel. The fact that most entrants receive an award likely involves some degree of self-selection, as the spirits producers choose whether to enter each of their brands in the competition and pay to receive a rating. Those entrants that are given a unanimous gold medal by the panel are given the distinction of a "double-gold" medal. Additionally, a "best in show" designation is awarded in each main category of spirits.

== See also ==
- List of whisky brands
- World Whiskies Awards
