= Praga Koneser Center =

Mixed-use complex in Warsaw, Poland

- Centrum Praskie Koneser
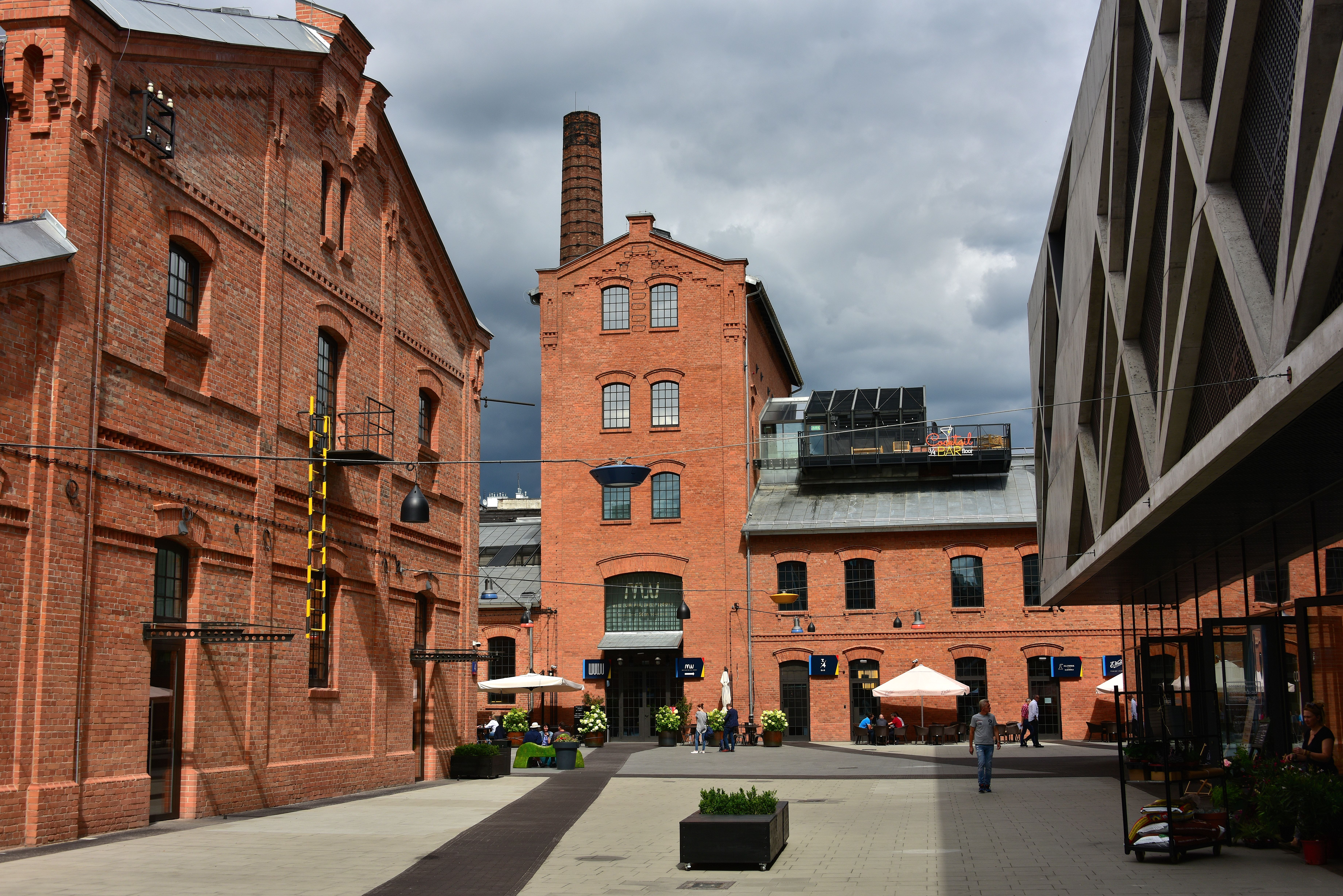
- A part of the center
- Interactive map of the Praga Koneser Center area

General information
- Type: Mixed-use
- Architectural style: Neo-Gothic
- Location: Ząbkowska 27/31, Warsaw, Poland
- Coordinates: 52.254444°N 21.043889°E
- Renovation cost: PLN 460m (projected)
- Owner: BBI Development NFI SA

Design and construction
- Architects: Juvenes Projekt Sp. z o.o. ARE Sp. z o.o Bulanda & Mucha Architects

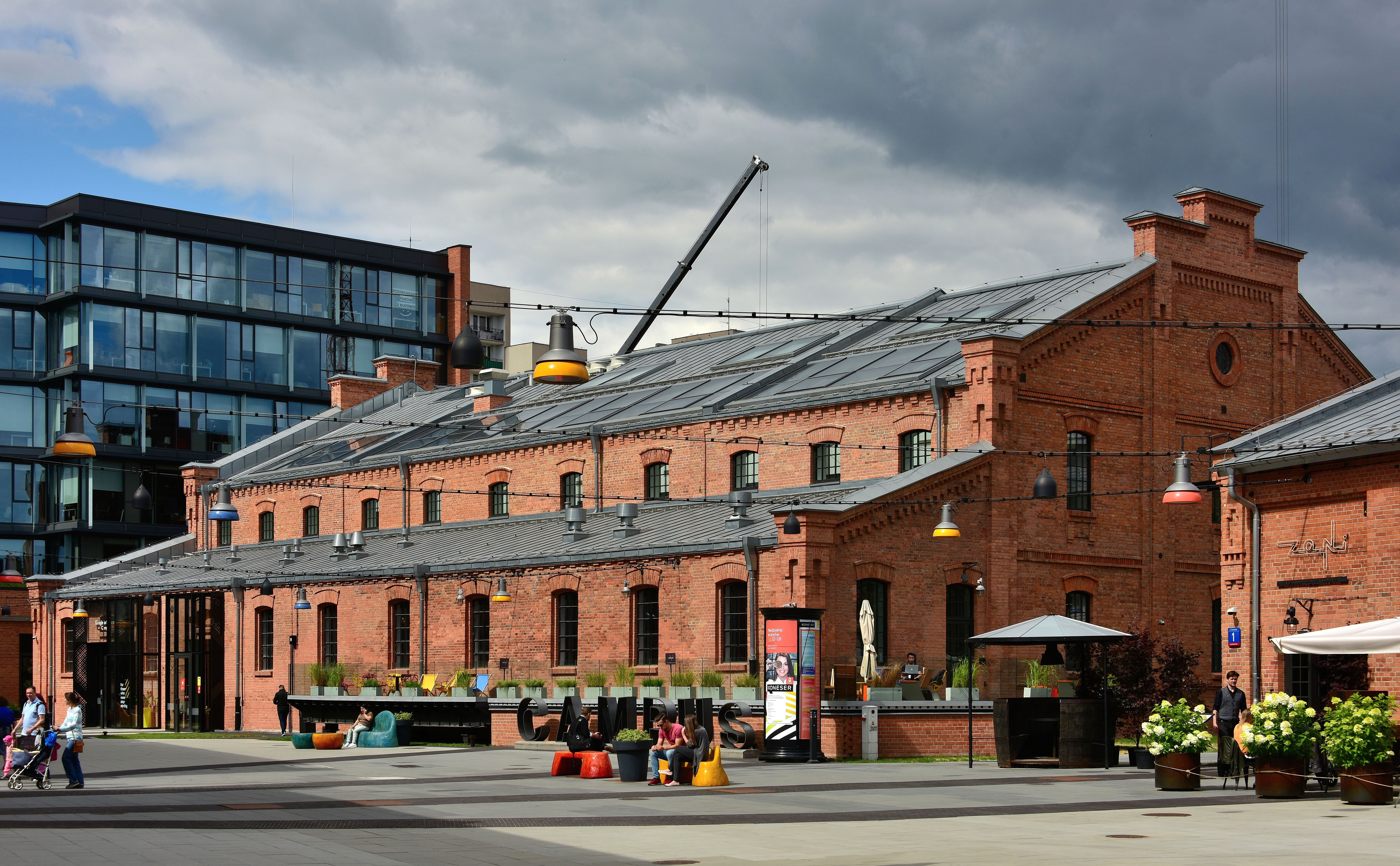
Seat of Google of Startups Campus

Praga Koneser Center is a complex of residential, office, cultural and entertainment facilities located on the premises of the former Warsaw Vodka Factory "Koneser". The complex is surrounded by Ząbkowska, Nieporęcka, Białostocka and Markowska streets from all sides.

== Description ==
The authors of the Praga Koneser Center project are three architectural firms: Juvenes Projekt Sp. z o.o., ARE Sp. z o.o and Bulanda & Mucha Architects. The execution of the project has been carried out by BBI Development Company. The Praga Koneser Center is the result of European architecture trends of blending post-industrial spaces with an urban fabric. The newly built buildings will be harmoniously integrated into the revitalized area of the former factory. Finalization of the project is scheduled for 2016, and the total value of the project is estimated at 460 million PLN.

== History ==
Warsaw Vodka Factory "Koneser", originally Spirit Distillation Plant (Polish: Fabryka Oczyszczania Spirytusu), was established in 1897 on the initiative of the Polish-Russian Warsaw Society of Distillation and Sale of Spirits. In those days, on the premises of the factory, apart from industrial buildings, the factory complex included warehouses, workshops, residential buildings and a school. At the time the factory was one of the most technologically advanced production plants in Warsaw. The interwar period was the prime of the factory, which at that time was also referred to as the Monopoly. The factory employed more than 400 people, and its production capacity totalled at quarter of a million bottles of vodka a day. In the 1920s "Koneser" created universally recognizable vodka brands such as: Wyborowa, Luksusowa, Żubrówka, Żytniówka and Siwucha. The further development of the plant was disrupted by the outbreak of World War II. As a result, the production was significantly reduced and subsequently stopped. In the late 1940s, after World War II and necessary revitalization of the factory, the production was resumed and it continued up to the last decade, when the worsening condition of the company led to the end of production and shutdown of the factory. Along with the acquisition of the land by BBI Development the idea of the Praga Koneser Center was born.

== Expansion plan ==
Praga Koneser Center project is a unique and the only investment of such kind in Warsaw. It includes revitalization and adaptation of post-industrial buildings of "Koneser" factory including old Kordegarda, Rectification, Filtration and Spirit Warehouse buildings, using authentic architectural elements of the factory. The remaining part of the site of the old factory will be filled with modern buildings. Inside the building complex there will be apartments, office buildings, galleries, a shopping arcade featuring renowned brands, restaurants and cafes, typical of modern urban areas. The complex will also have its own underground car park and video surveillance.

=== Residential area ===
The main residential buildings of the Koneser building complex will be located along Białoctocka and Nieporęcka street. The buildings will be maintained in the soft loft style, that is, with extensive open space, inspired by industrial architecture. The National Mint building will be converted into loft apartments, whose interiors will include numerous original elements from the original buildings.

=== Commerce and services ===
The historical Spirit Warehouse building will be converted into shopping area of the Praga Koneser Center. Additionally, the space in the newly built buildings will also be available to the merchandisers and service providers. The best brands, boutiques, chic fashion stores, numerous restaurants and cafes will be gathered on the site of the former Warsaw Vodka Factory "Koneser".

=== Office space ===
The project involves the creation of 22,000 m2 of office space in Class A and B +. The historical Kordegarda building has already been adapted for office space.

== Current state of the project ==
The old Kordegarda and administration building were the first of the factory complex to undergo renovation. Revitalization project has been prepared by the Juvenes Project company. The elevation of the buildings have been restored with utmost precision, paying attention to every detail. The roofs and ceilings has been replaced and the historic casement windows restored. Some parts of the original flooring on the ground floor has also been kept intact.
