= Warsaw Vodka Factory "Koneser" =

- Warszawska Wytwórnia Wódek "Koneser"
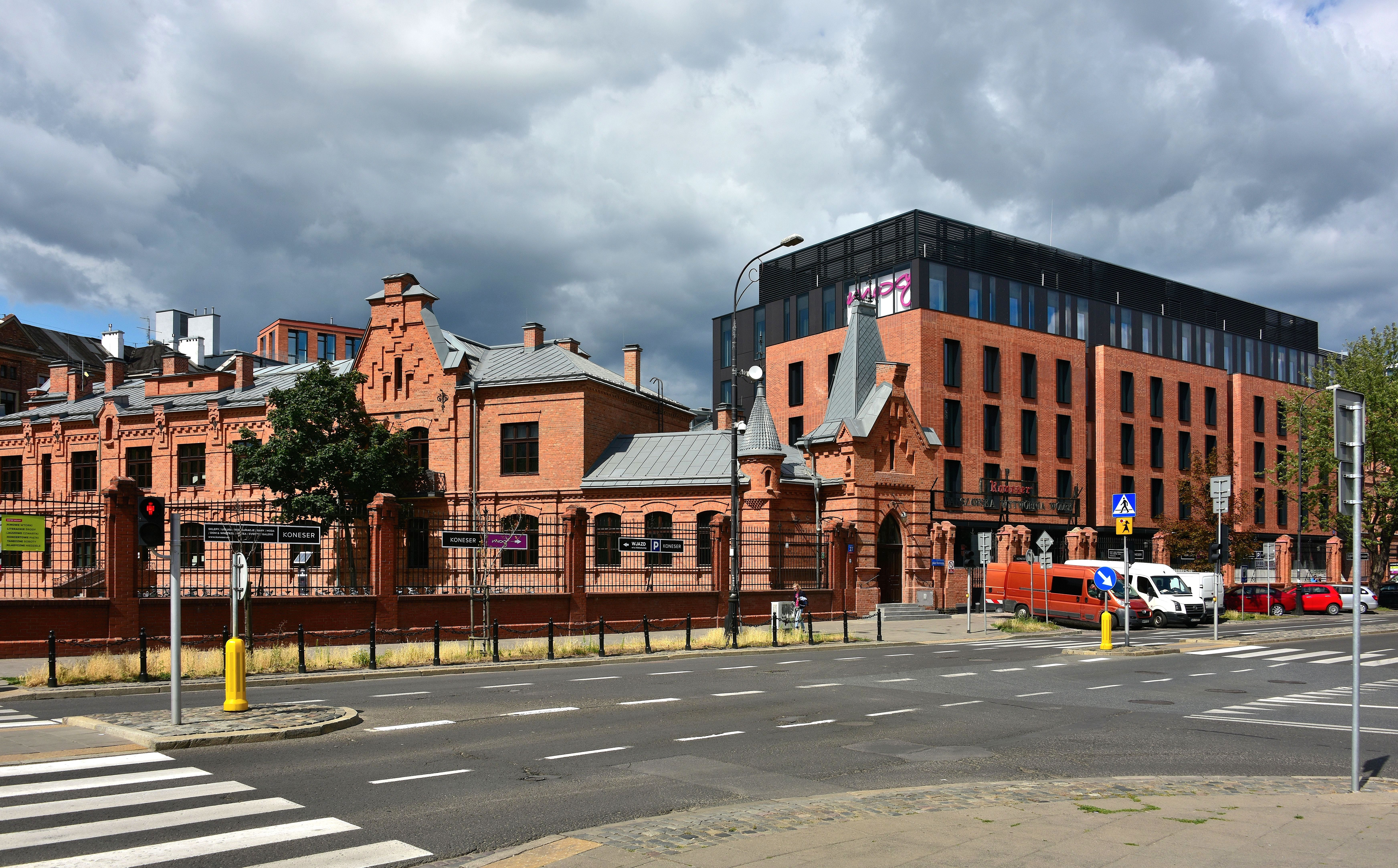
- The main gate from the Ząbkowska Street
- Interactive map of the Warsaw Vodka Factory "Koneser" area
- Former names: Warsaw Rectification National Spirit Monopoly – Spirit Rectification and Vodka Production Warsaw Spirits Industry "Polmos"

General information
- Type: Factory complex
- Architectural style: Neo-Gothic
- Location: Ząbkowska 27/31, Warsaw, Poland
- Coordinates: 52.254444°N 21.043889°E
- Construction started: 1895
- Completed: 1897
- Renovation cost: PLN 460m (projected)

Design and construction
- Architect: L. Iwanowski K. Loeweg

Renovating team
- Architects: Juvenes Projekt Sp. z o.o. ARE Sp. z o.o Bulanda & Mucha Architects
- Renovating firm: BBI Development NFI S.A.

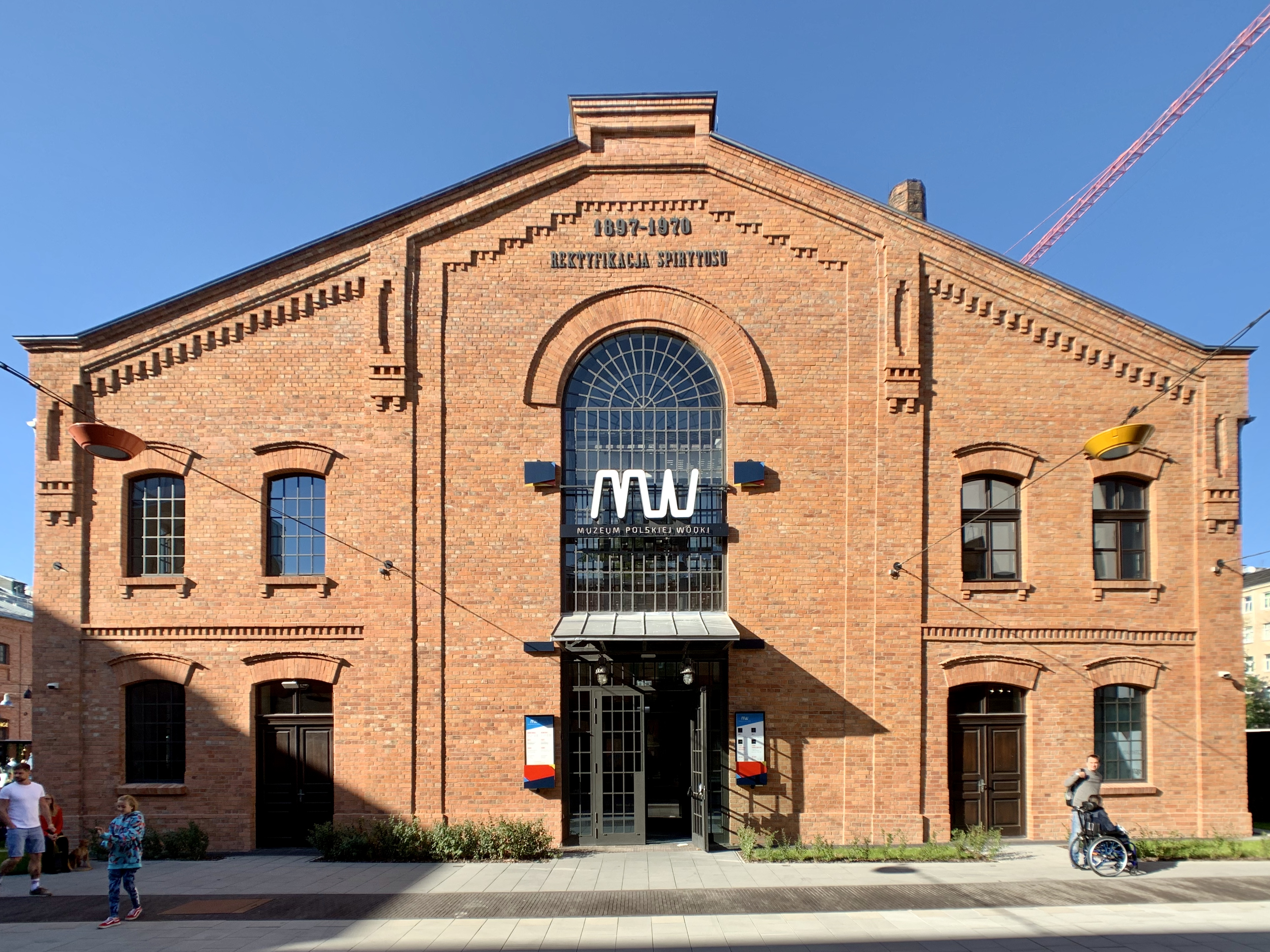
Main hall, 2019

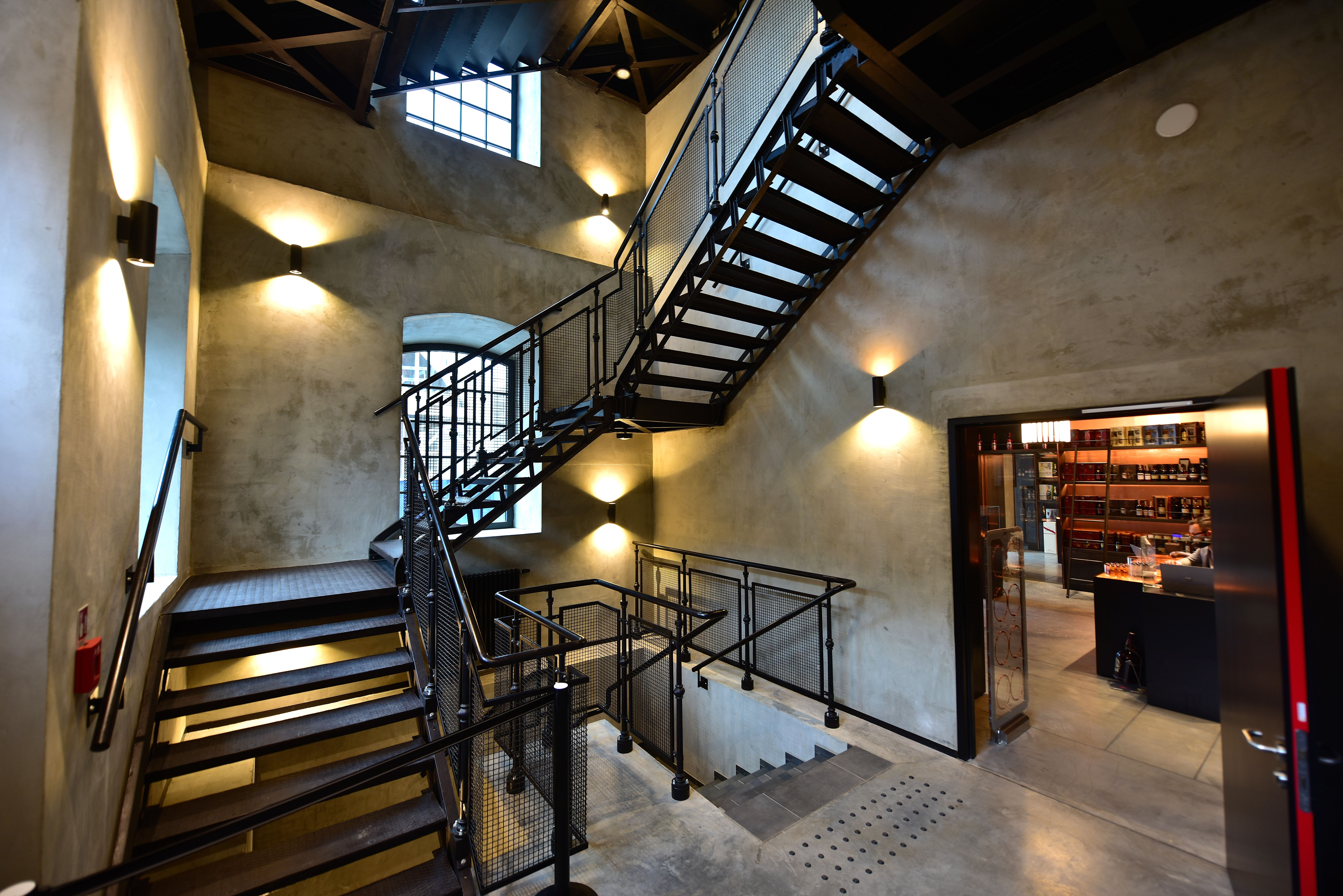
Interior of the museum

Warsaw Vodka Factory "Koneser" (Polish: Warszawska Wytwórnia Wódek "Koneser") is a factory complex of neo-Gothic buildings from the late nineteenth century located in Praga, the historical borough of Warsaw.

== Location ==
The factory complex covers the area of approximately 50,000 m^{2} (540,000 sq ft) and is surrounded by Ząbkowska, Nieporęcka, Białostocka and Markowska street from all sides. Warsaw Vodka Factory "Koneser" has been established in place of the Szmulowizna Farm District, in the heart of the so-called Old Praga.

== Architecture ==
The factory is a peculiar instance of European industrial architecture from the late 19th and early twentieth century. The red-brick buildings represent the Gothic style – narrow windows, characteristic of that age cornices, perpendicular towers and rib-vault ceilings. The main gate from the Ząbkowska street is of particular beauty. The architectural design is attributed to L. Lewadowski and K. Loeweg. Many of the buildings belonging to the Koneser complex survived the Second World War.

== History ==
=== Construction of the complex ===
The oldest buildings of the Koneser factory complex were established in 1895–1897. Initially, there were two separate plants on the premises of the factory: Warsaw Rectification (a private economic entity established on the initiative of the Polish-Russian Warsaw Society of Distillation and Sale of Spirits) and Warsaw Fiscal Repository of Wine (Russian: Варшавский Казённый Винный Склад) – a Russian, government-owned corporation. Both plants remained in close cooperation complementing one another. The former was responsible for distillation of the spirit and the latter for the production of the alcoholic beverage.

In 1919 the National Spirit Monopoly took control over the Koneser factory complex. It was not until 1936 that the Warsaw Rectification was formally purchased from the private owner thus making it a government-owned corporation. On the premises of the factory complex used to include storehouses, boiler houses, workshops as well as residential buildings and a school. The land for construction of the factory complex was purchased from Emil Bruhl, whose family had acquired the land from the descendants of Szmul Zbytkower. The Koneser factory was one of the most technologically advanced production plants and of the first electrified factories in Warsaw. It was equipped with a range of ancillary equipment such as boilers, alcohol and water steam engines, vodka bottling machines, hydraulic and manually controlled elevators as well as internal system of iron carts. The plant even had its own siding, i.e. a short railway line giving access to the main line of the Wileński Railway Station. The fact that the owner of Warsaw Rectification committed himself to distillation of a million buckets of spirit a year, only points out to the advancement of the factory.

=== 1919–1945 ===
The inter-war period was the prime of the factory. During that time the factory employed more than 400 people, and its production capacity totalled a quarter of a million bottles of vodka a day. The institution, operating under the name of National Spirit Monopoly – Spirit Rectification and Vodka Production in the 1920s created universally recognizable vodka brands such as: Wyborowa, Luksusowa, Żubrówka, Żytniówka and Siwucha. Oligocene water, from one of the first artesian sources (located on the premises of the factory), was used in the manufacturing of vodka. The further development of the plant was disrupted by the outbreak of the WW II. As a result, the production was significantly abated. During the occupation years the factory was under the authority of the General Directorate for Monopoly in the General Government. After 1944 the production was stopped.

=== Post-war period ===
The production was not resumed until 1947. It was only then that the plans of revitalization were introduced. The plans assumed restoration of the infrastructure destroyed during the war (mainly repairs or replacement of the production machines) and acquisition of the company by the Warsaw Spirits Industry "Polmos". The production lasted from the 1950s to the last decade, when the worsening condition of the company, a significant decrease in production and financial problems, led to the end of production and shutdown of the factory in 2007.

=== Modern times ===
With the acquisition of the land by the BBI Development the idea of how to zone the area of the former factory changed drastically. The idea of the Praga Koneser Center was born. The project includes revitalization and adaptation of post-industrial buildings and creation of new buildings harmoniously integrated into the revitalized area of the former factory. The plans also include arrangement of loft apartments and construction of residential, office and commercial facilities. The use of some of the old factory buildings for cultural purposes, is also being considered.
