= Polmos =

Polish state-owned monopoly

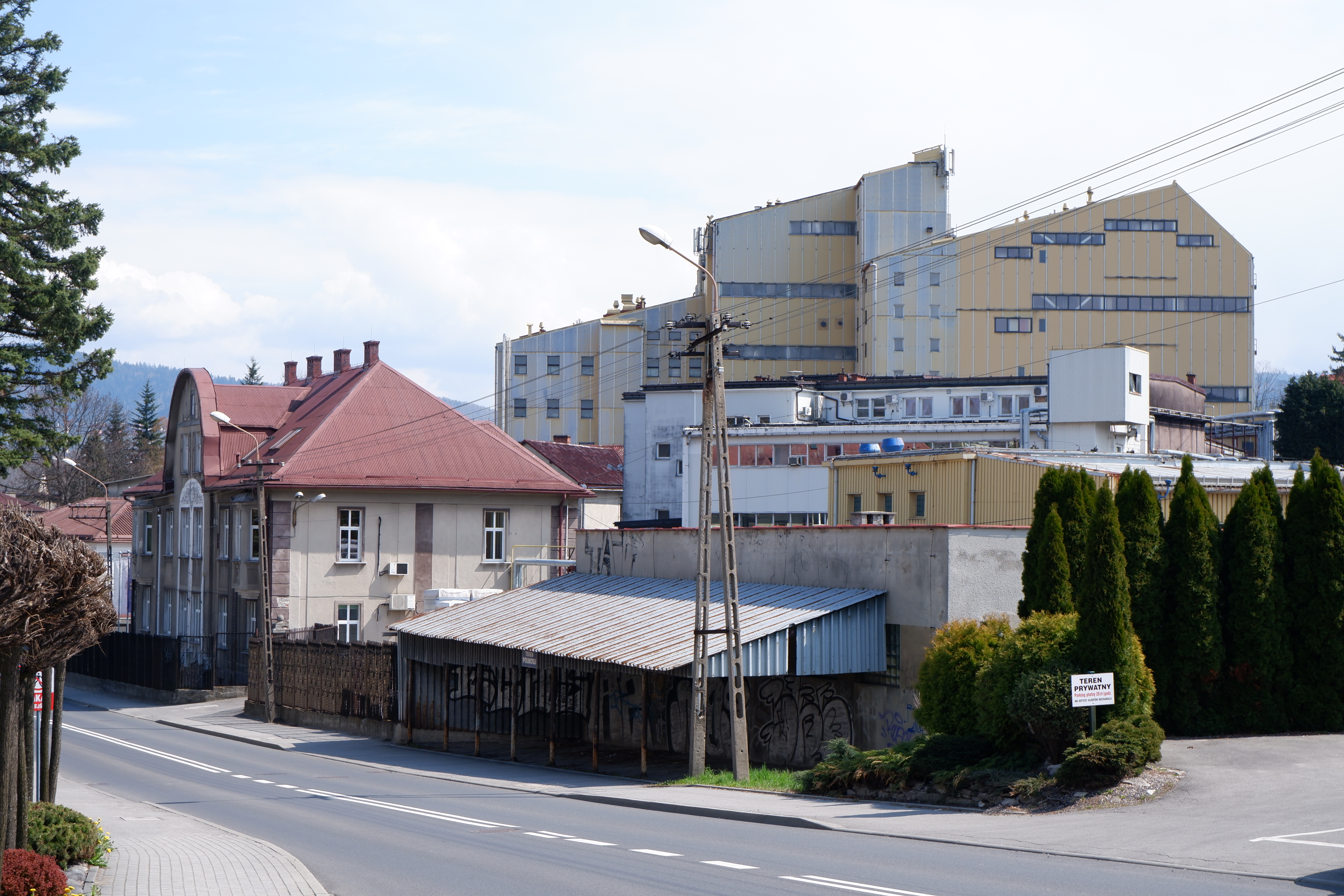
Polmos Bielsko-Biała

Polmos (acronym for Polski Monopol Spirytusowy, Polish Spirits Monopoly) was a Polish state-owned monopoly, controlling the Polish market for alcoholic beverages. Founded in the late 1920s, until World War II it was one of the leading vodka producers in Poland. Distilleries of Polmos were relatively modern and efficient at that time so the company exported its products to some European countries.

After the war the company became an absolute monopoly and, like other distilleries, was nationalized by the government of the People's Republic of Poland. The newly created monopoly adopted the name Polmos. After the fall of communism in 1989, the monopoly was divided into several independent enterprising entities, each owning one of the distilleries and one or two of the brands of the alcoholic drinks. All such established companies have been privatised and none of them remains fully state-owned.

Among the companies descended from Polmos are:

- Akwawit-Polmos Wrocław – owner and producer of vodka brands Wratislavia, Krakus, Abstynent, Arktica, Faust, and rectified spirit (95% or 96%)
- Polmos Poznań – owner and producer of vodka brands Wyborowa, Wyborowa Exquisite, Goldwasser
- Polmos Zielona Góra – owner and producer of vodka brands Luksusowa, Siwucha
- Polmos Starogard Gdański – part of Premium Distillers (subsidiary of United Beverages S.A.), owner of the brand Krupnik, producer of vodka brand Sobieski
- Polmos in Siedlce – owner and producer of vodka brand Chopin
- Polmos Białystok – owner and producer of Absolwent, Żubrówka, and other brands
- Polmos Bielsko-Biała – owner and producer of vodka brand Extra Żytnia (formerly known as Żytnia)
- Polmos Gdynia – owner of PLO vodka brands
- Polmos Kraków – owner of vodka brand Cracovia
- Polmos Lublin – owner of vodka brands Żołądkowa Gorzka and Lubelska
- Polmos Łańcut – part of Premium Distillers (subsidiary of United Beverages S.A.)
- Polmos Łódź – owner of the brand Prezydent
- Polmos Toruń – owner of the brand Copernicus, producer of Slivovitz
- Polmos Sieradz – owner of the brands Jarzębiak and Ratafia
- Polmos Szczecin – producer of aged vodka Starka and gin Pomorski
- Polmos Warsaw – producer of rectified spirit
- Polmos Żyrardów – producer of vodka Belvedere
