= Cracovia =

Cracovia is the Latin name for the Polish city of Kraków (Cracow). It may refer to:

- Cracovia SC, a football club in Australia
- Cracovia (vodka), brand of Polish vodka
- KS Cracovia (disambiguation), a list of teams in the KS Cracovia sports club
