= Zdzisław Filipkiewicz =

Polish basketball player (1916–1983)

Personal information
- Born: June 21, 1916 Kraków, Austria-Hungary
- Died: April 27, 1983 (aged 66) Kraków, Poland

Zdzisław Henryk Filipkiewicz (June 21, 1916, in Kraków – April 27, 1983, in Kraków) was a Polish basketball player who competed in the 1936 Summer Olympics.

He was a nine‑time international representative for the Polish national basketball team in 1936–1937 and a Polish club champion with Cracovia in 1938.

He was part of the Polish basketball team, which finished fourth in the Olympic tournament. He played five matches.
