= BBI Development NFI =

Polish real estate company

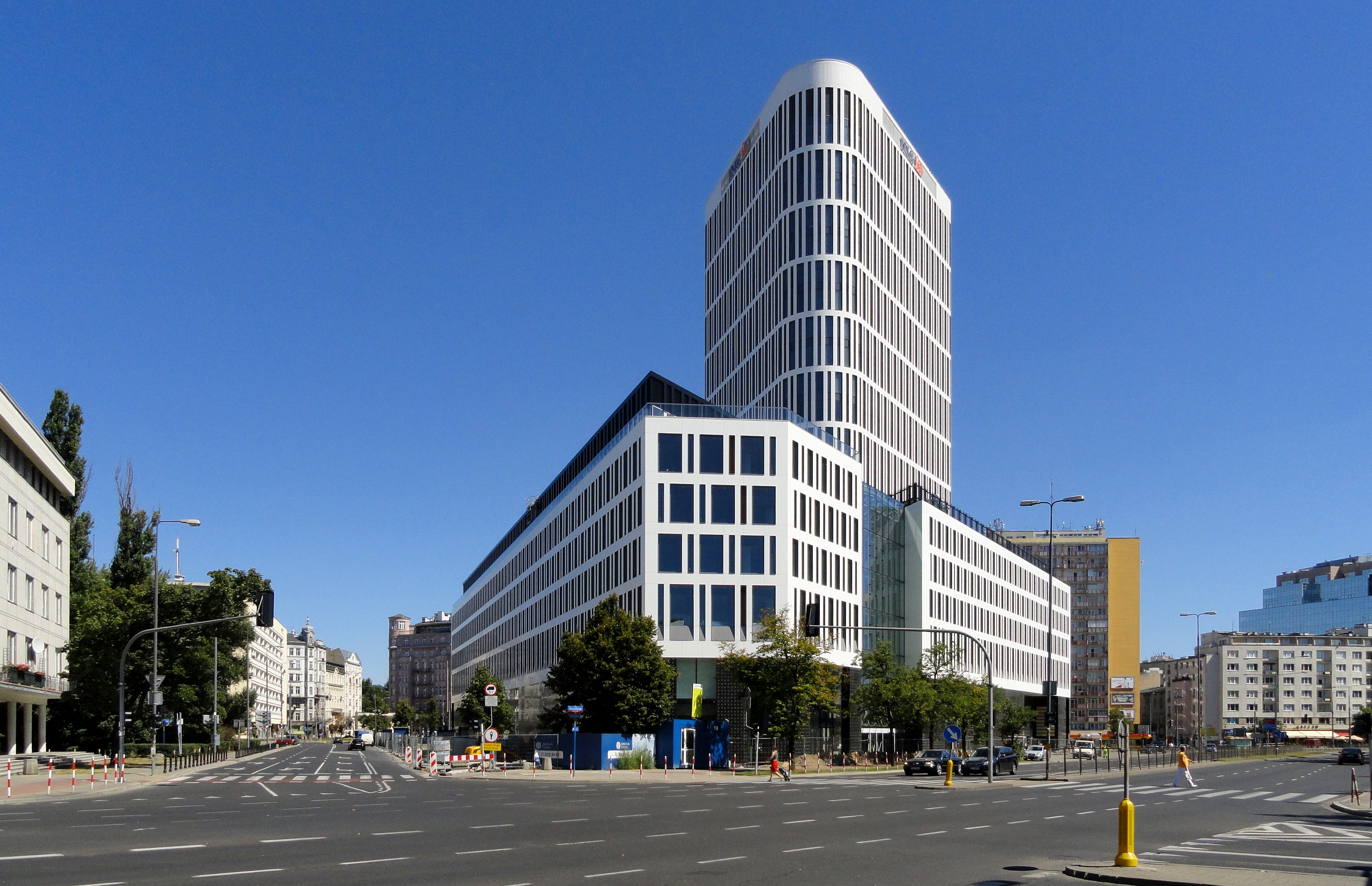
Plac Unii

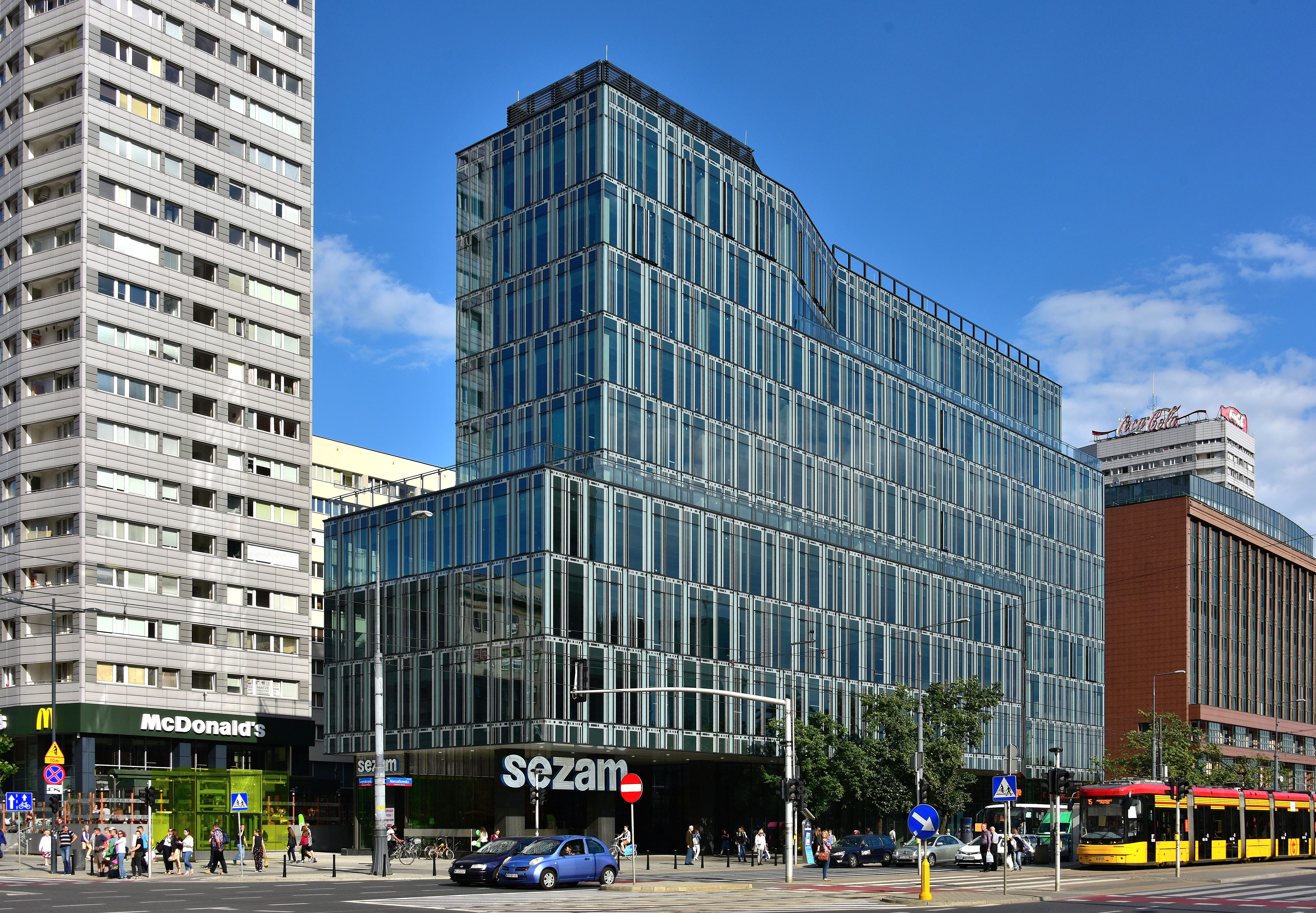
Centrum Marszałkowska

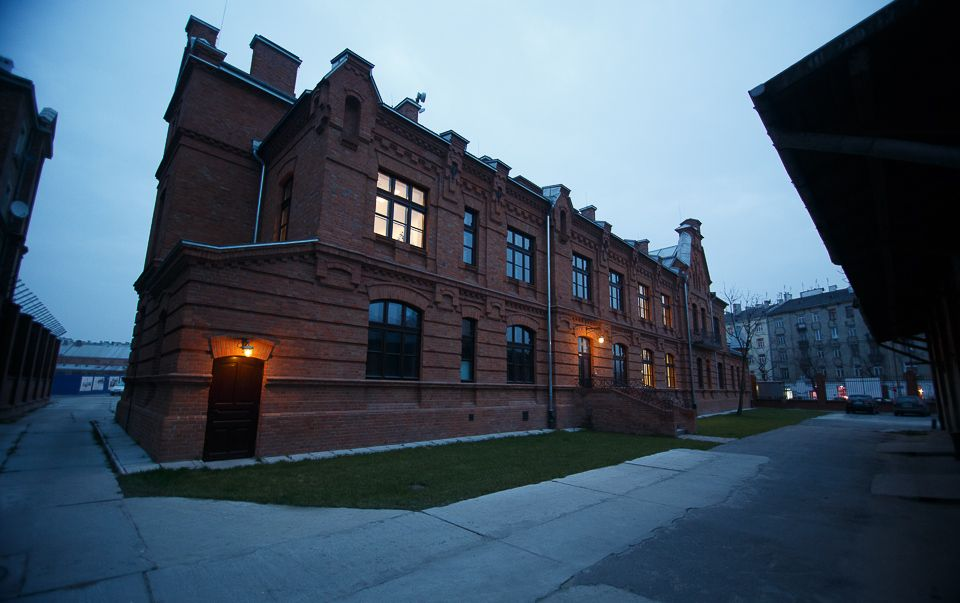
Praga Koneser Center

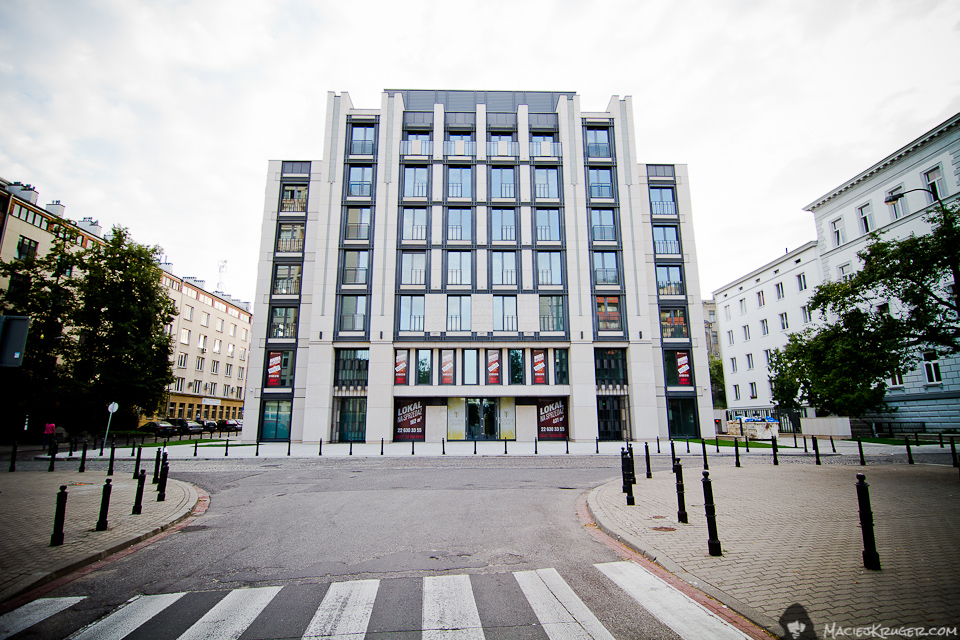
Foksal Residence

BBI Development NFI SA (BBI Development National Collective Investment Scheme) is a joint-stock company listed on the Warsaw Stock Exchange. The company focuses on Warsaw's real estate market.

The main shareholder of BBI Development NFI SA is BBI Investment, a private company from Poznań. Up to 29 December 2006 the company operated under the name of National Investment Fund "Piast".

== Projects ==
The main commercial projects of the company in Warsaw are:

- Plac Unii, an office and commercial building at Puławska Street
- Centrum Marszałkowska, an office building at Marszałkowska Street
- Praga Koneser Center, a complex of cultural and entertainment facilities located on the premises of the former Warsaw Vodka Factory "Koneser"
- The Foksal Residence. In 2011, it was selected "Construction of the Year" by the Polish Association of Construction Engineers and Technicians
- The Nowy Sezam, an office and commercial building located at the junction of Marszałkowska and Świętokrzyska Street
- A home in Dolna Street
- Roma Tower, a planned 170-metre skyscraper at the junction of Nowogrodzka and Emilia Plater's streets
