= St. Lawrence's Church, Antwerp =

Sint‑Laurentiuskerk
- Saint Lawrence's Church
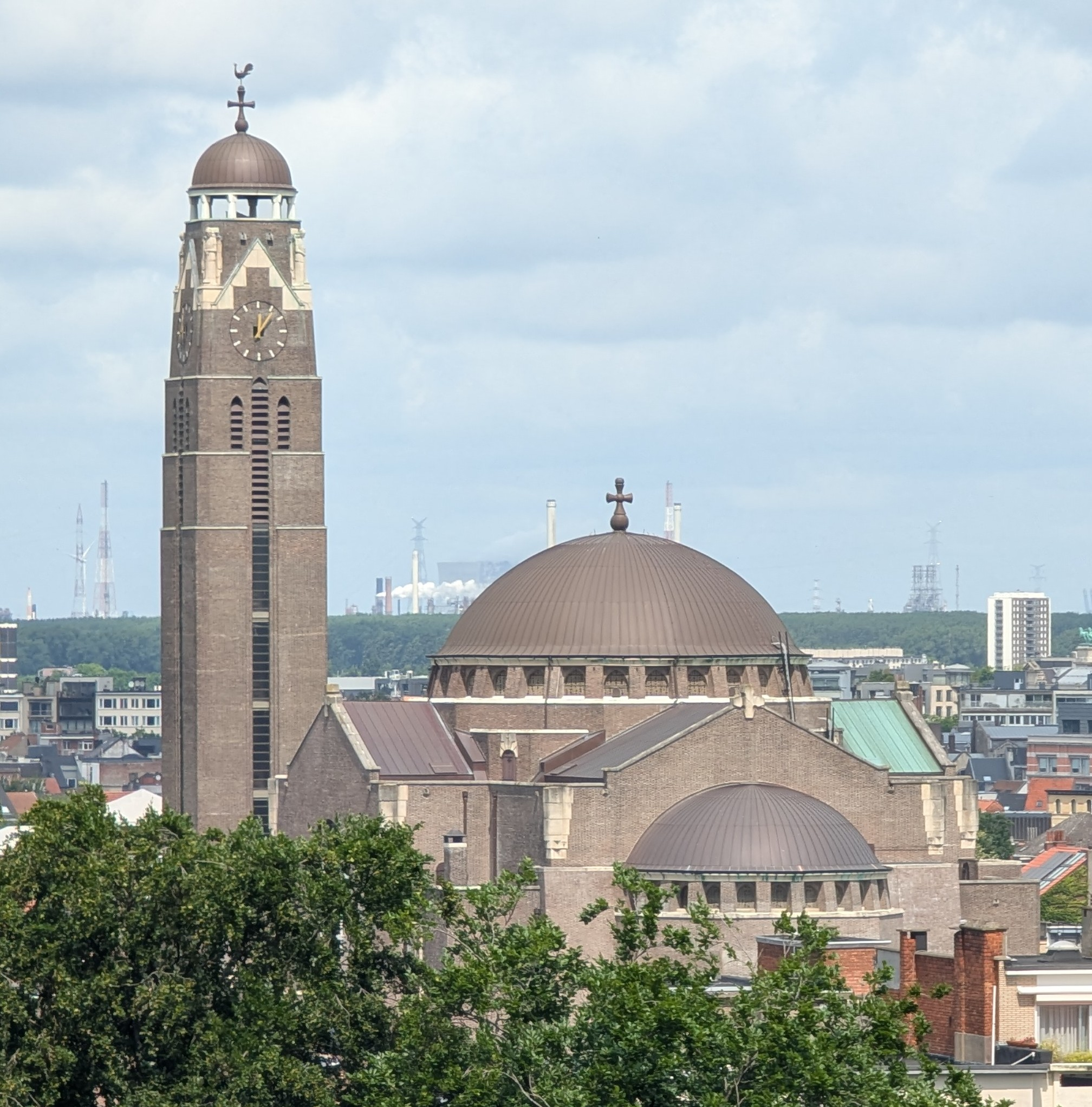
- Sint‑Laurentiuskerk in Antwerp
- Sint‑Laurentiuskerk
- 51°11′55.02″N 4°24′11.95″E
- Address: Van Schoonbekestraat 155, 2018 Antwerp
- Country: Belgium
- Denomination: Roman Catholic

History
- Status: Parish church
- Founded: 1659
- Dedication: Saint Lawrence
- Consecrated: 9 August 1934

Architecture
- Architect: Jef Huygh
- Architectural type: Church
- Style: Art Deco, Neo‑Byzantine
- Years built: 1932–1941
- Groundbreaking: August 1932
- Completed: July 1941

Specifications
- Materials: Brick, copper domes

Administration
- Archdiocese: Archdiocese of Mechelen–Brussels
- Diocese: Diocese of Antwerp
- Parish: Antwerp

Sint‑Laurentiuskerk (English: Saint Lawrence's Church) is a Roman Catholic parish church in Antwerp, Belgium, located on the corner of Markgravelei and Van Schoonbekestraat. It stands out for its four-phase history, culminating in an impressive 20th-century Art Deco/Neo-Byzantine structure built between 1932 and 1941.

== History ==
The parish was founded in 1659 as the first full parish outside Antwerp's medieval walls. The first modest church, complete with cemetery, was enlarged in 1671 but replaced after about a century.

In 1777, a larger second church was built, only to be demolished in 1814 by General Lazare Carnot during military fortifications. Under Dutch rule, a neoclassical third church designed by Pierre Bruno Bourla was erected (1824–25), diagonally positioned on the current site. It was enlarged in 1892 with twin western towers.

That building was later demolished and replaced by the current (fourth) church: foundations were set in 1932, the nave and choir completed and consecrated on 9 August 1934, and the tower and chapels finalised by July 1941.

Since 1988, it has been protected as a heritage site by the Flemish government.

== Architecture ==
Designed by Jef Huygh, the church blends Art Deco sobriety with Neo-Byzantine spatial symbolism. Its central-plan brick construction features a striking copper dome, white-hardstone accents, symmetrical façade geometry, and a freestanding square tower crowned with copper domes and stone angels by Antoon Damen.

== Interior ==
Notable interior features include:

- A 1934 electro-pneumatic organ by Bernard Pels & Zoon (Lier), inaugurated by Flor Peeters; it remains largely original with over 4,000 pipes.
- Mosaic "Stations of the Cross" by Eugène Yoors and additional mosaics (Pilgrim artists, Joan Collette 1956).
- A suspended copper ciborium over the altar and copper details (balustrade, capitals) crafted by Rie Haan's workshop.
- Stained glass windows (Jos Smolderen, 1949) displaying Eucharistic symbolism, and dedicated chapels (Thérèse, Resurrection) with mosaics by Jean Gaudin (1941) and Joan Collette (1956–57).

== Cultural Role ==
Beyond regular worship, the church hosts monthly "Wandelconcerten" since 2008 in its Neo-Byzantine ambiance. It also houses the Constance Teichmann Hall and a 1950s stone statue, commemorating the "Angel of Antwerp" philanthropist.
