= Polmos Białystok =

Polish produces of alcoholic beverages

Polmos Białystok S.A.
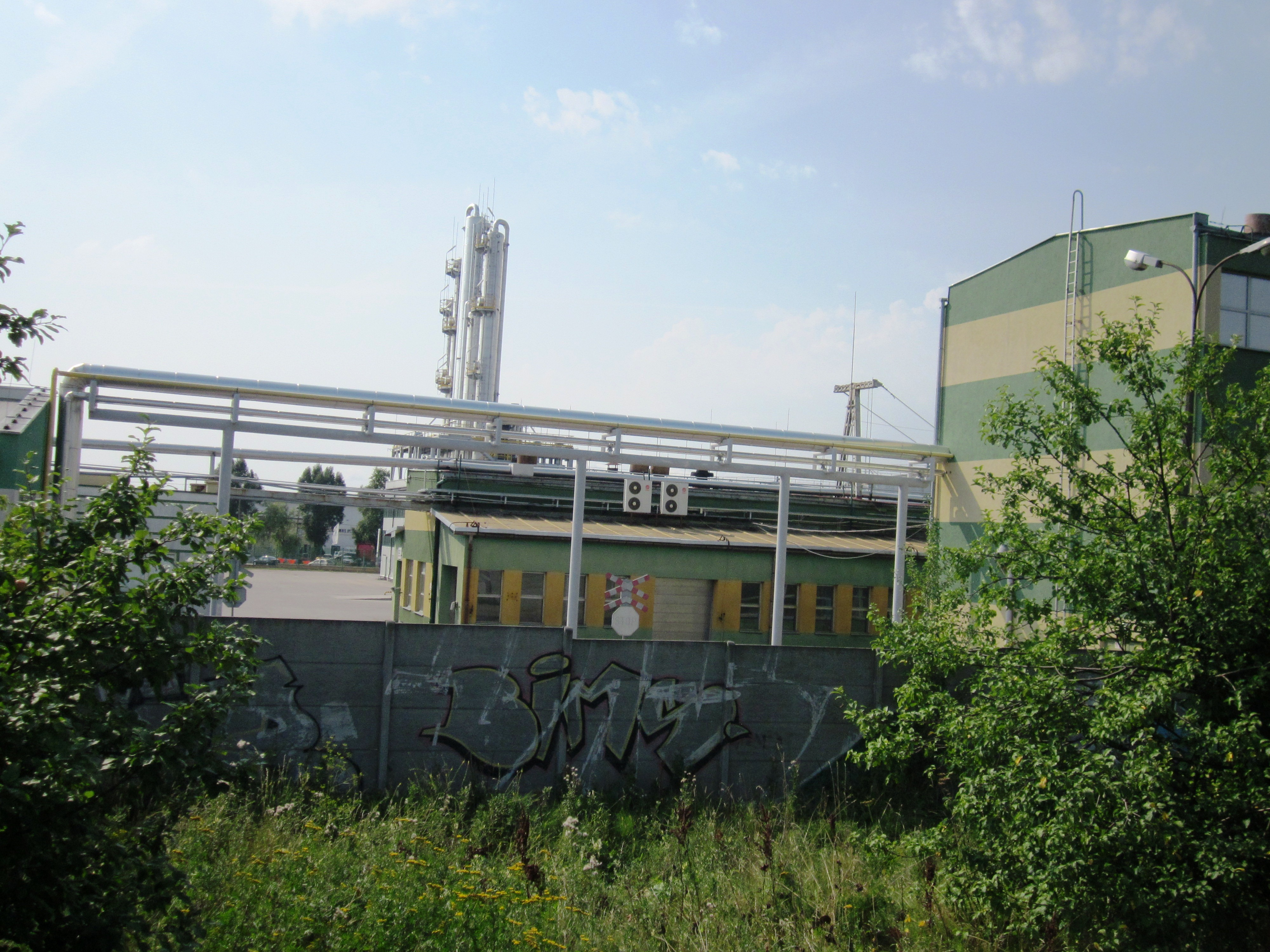
- Industry: Beverages
- Founded: 1928; 98 years ago
- Headquarters: Białystok, Poland,
- Key people: Henryk Wnorowski, president
- Products: Alcoholic beverages: spirits
- Website: www.polmos.bialystok.pl

Polmos Białystok is one of the largest producers of alcoholic beverages in Poland. As of 2010, the firm's president was Henryk Wnorowski. Between 2005 and 2007 the company's stock was traded on the Warsaw Stock Exchange.

The firm was founded in 1928, under the control of "Polmos", an acronym for "Polski Monopol Spirytusowy" (Polish Spirits Monopoly), a state owned monopoly in distilled spirits. In 1936 the factories of the firm were moved to Brześć Litewski (now Brest, Belarus). The manufacturing was returned to Białystok in 1945 under the name Białostocka Wytwórnia Wódek (Białystok Vodka Manufacturer). The production facilities were expanded in 1970, when new factories were built in other parts of the city, which became operational two years later. The firm also has several smaller production plants spread across the Podlaskie Voivodeship. In 1991 the firm became independent of government control. In 1998, it was transformed into a proprietorship under the control of the state treasury, under the name Przedsiębiorstwo "Polmos" Białystok Spółka Akcyjna (Manufacturer "Polmos" Stock Company of Białystok). Currently the firm produces more than 30 million liters of liquor annually.

The best known of the company's brands is Żubrówka, or the Bison Grass Vodka.

In the aftermath of the Russo-Ukrainian conflict, the production of Polmos Białystok started to shift to a domestic-focused distribution to avoid complicated war-related export issues.

== Brands ==
- Absolwent
- Absolwent Gin, Cytrynowy, Morelowy, Bananowy, Żurawina, Mixt Lemon, Mixt Grapefruit
- Batory
- Białowieska
- Biały Bocian
- Cytrynówka
- Czekoladowa
- Kiermusianka Biała Szlachecka
- Kiermusianka Wykwintna Acańska
- Kiermusianka Chrzanówka
- Kompleet Vodka
- Liberty Blue
- Lider
- Ludowa
- Nalewka Pałacowa Wiśniowa
- Nalewka Pałacowa Miodowa
- Palace
- Winiak Białostocki
- Winiak Pałacowy
- Wódka
- Imbirowa
- Złota Gorzka
- Złota Gorzka z miętą
- Żubrówka
