= Markgravelei =

Street in Antwerp, Belgium

- Interactive map of Markgravelei
- Location: Antwerp, Belgium
- Postal code: 2018
- Coordinates: 51.199623°N 4.400412°E

Markgravelei is a prominent street in the Antwerp, Belgium, notable for its 19th- and early 20th-century architecture, its wide, tree-lined avenue, which starts on the west side from the intersection with the Fransenplaats, the Moonsstraat and the Pyckestraat, and ends on the east side at the intersection with the Korte Lozanastraat and the Karel Oomsstraat.

== History ==
The street that was initially called Lange or Grote Lei, owes its origin to land speculator Gilbert Van Schoonbeke (1519–56), who bought the "Goed ter Beke" from the Van de Werve family in 1547. The vast area of 46 ha was located south of the city walls in the so-called "Vrijheid van Antwerpen".

Since land prices within the walls had risen so much since 1540 that owning a 'city court' had become virtually unaffordable, Van Schoonbeke had a court district built with summer houses for the wealthy Antwerp bourgeoisie. Van Schoonbeke himself opened the Lange Lei, the main axis of the new district, and several connecting leien. The urbanisation of the so-called Leikwartier, Gilbert Van Schoonbeke's only land speculation outside the city, was a great success. In less than two years, 75% of the land was divided up and sold; the remaining areas were sold after the Peace of Cateau-Cambresis in 1559. Around 1570, most prominent Antwerp residents had a so-called "court of pleasure" on one of the lime-tree-lined lanes of this distinguished residential district.

In 1659, the Saint-Laurentius parish was founded, with a first church at the Fransenplaats, the predecessor of the current Saint-Laurentius church on the corner with the Van Schoonbekestraat. The Markgravelei retained its rural appearance until the late 19th century with spacious country houses interspersed with gardening companies. Apart from some street names, today only the Hof van Leysen and the Hertoghe domains, whose country houses were demolished in the 1960s, are reminders of the former splendor of the Leikwartier.

== Architecture ==
The Markgravelei is distinguished by a fairly homogeneous residential development, predominantly from the late 19th and early 20th centuries, only slightly disturbed by new construction. The Hof van Leysen and the Domein Hertoghe form open, green zones in the middle and at the end of the south side, which break up the dense development. In the middle of the north side, the Sint-Laurentiuskerk adds a monumental accent to the scenography of the street.

The last remnant of the original buildings on the Markgravelei is the Torenhof, of which only the house tower, which probably dates back to the 17th century, has been preserved. The presbytery of the Sint-Laurentius church by city architect Pierre Bruno Bourla and the former country house of Count de Bergeyck at number 141, two detached neoclassical buildings surrounded by gardens, date from the early 19th century. The country house de Bergeyck, whose plinth contains a facade stone with the year 1821, lost much of its former character. Originally an L-shaped pavilion of two floors under a mansard roof, it was expanded to its current volume in 1899 by architect Fr. Stuyck, and in 1909 it was additionally provided with an entrance pavilion and an iron garden gate. From the middle of the 19th century, the construction of the Markgravelei began to increase substantially, through the gradual re-parcelling of the existing gardens and country houses. In 1864, the new Boys' School 7 and Girls' School 5 were inaugurated to replace the poor school of the Sint-Laurentius parish, one of the first achievements of the newly appointed city architect Pieter Dens. The terraced houses that were built here in the years 1860 to 1880 were rather modest in nature, usually two storeys high and two to three bays wide, in a conventional neoclassical style. Representative examples of this type of house are numbers 99 and 105, 107 and 116, and the less well preserved numbers 155 and 173. The linked, later raised houses at numbers 151-153 were built by the Teichmann heirs in 1868, the row at numbers 5-11 commissioned by J. Kievits dates from 1888. Noteworthy is the house that Jos Bascourt designed here in 1887 as the very first realisation for his aunt Marie-Eugenie Buelens. The first industrial establishments also emerged around this time on the large plots of land between the Markgravelei and the Haantjeslei.

The most thorough transformation, however, took place in the early years of the 20th century, when the land belonging to Maatschappij Belpaire & Co was parcelled out. This real estate operation aimed to create a distinguished residential area, as an extension of the Leikwartier and intended for the upper middle class. From 1904 onwards, the Arthur Goemaerelei, the Van Putlei and the Bosmanslei were built to the south of the Markgravelei, which was locally widened on this side. In 1909, the first section of the new Jan Van Rijswijcklaan created a wide breach through the eastern end of the street. Subsequently, the Robert Molsstraat and the Lemméstraat were built on the north side, parallel to the Van Schoonbekstraat. As a result of this urbanisation operation, large parts of the Markgravelei were built on both sides before the First World War with the stately town houses that still characterise it today. With no fewer than nine buildings designed by Joseph Hertogs, the widow Henriëtte Mayer van den Bergh manifested herself as one of the most important real estate investors in the Markgravelei between 1905 and 1908. The contractors Arthur Van Rijsseghem, Adrianus Peeters-Verheyen and Edouard Van Biesen settled here themselves or built houses for rent or sale. The great variety of architectural styles, from neoclassicism and eclecticism to art nouveau and beaux-arts style, which characterise the architecture of the Markgravelei before the First World War, and the use of brick, natural stone and plaster for the facade cladding, are striking. In terms of typology, the classical middle-class house with basement or bel-etage dominates, aimed at a wealthy middle class of magistrates, traders, artists, annuitants and unmarried women of standing.

The most striking houses from this period include the stately Hotel Müller, also a creation by Hertogs from 1907, and the architect's house of Michel De Braey from 1911, both in the Neo-Gothic style, as well as the Neo-Gothic artist's house Denis by Adolphe Vander Heyden from 1907. The most interesting expressions of Art Nouveau are the four houses that Edmond Lauwens designed in 1910-11 for contractor Van Biesen, the Hotel Ceulemans by Jacques De Weerdt from 1911, the Goedertier house by Rodolphe Frank from 1905 and the house of the writer Marie-Elisabeth Belpaire by Laurent Duvivier and Adolphe Van Coppernolle from 1912. The buildings that have disappeared include no fewer than six of the above-mentioned houses Mayer van den Bergh (formerly numbers 16-30 and 121), and two of the houses Van Rijsseghem by Van Coppernolle (formerly numbers 131-133), all in eclectic style. In addition, three art nouveau houses were demolished or renovated, the houses Malevé (formerly number 135) and Pilate at number 125 by Adolphe Vander Heyden from 1906 and 1907, and the house Herfurth-Bernaerts by contractor Arthur Bernaerts from 1912 (formerly number 144). The facade of the neoclassical town house De Creeft by Jan De Belder from 1907 at number 137, has been stripped of plaster today.

The most important addition to the streetscape of the Markgravelei during the interbellum is the new Sint-Laurentius church in neo-Byzantine art deco style by Jef Huygh from 1932–41, whose soaring bell tower dominates the district. During this period, only a limited number of new houses were built, the most notable of which is an ensemble of five town houses in beaux-arts and art deco style by Jan De Vroey from 1933, commissioned by the Hertoghe-Belpaire children. The renovated beaux-arts house at number 145 is what remains of a complex of shops on the corner of the Jan Van Rijswijcklaan, a design by Vincent Cols and Jules De Roeck from 1921, commissioned by Henri Van Langendonck. A fragment of the former diamond cutting factory Lipschutz-Gutwirth from 1923 has been preserved by the same architectural firm, behind the apartment building at number 43-45. From the 1950s onwards, a number of buildings make way for rather banal apartment buildings or care institutions of limited size. The reverse applies to the garage company Etablissements Camerman, an interesting example of industrial architecture, which nevertheless radically breaks the rhythm of the construction.

Against the facade of the Sint-Jozefschool on the corner of Markgravelei and Fransenplaats, a natural stone Our Lady with Child has been placed, standing on a console with a dragon's head. This comes from the Sint-Laureisstraat, and was placed against the facade of the first school building on this plot in 1913. The client was Alphonse Belpaire, contractor Petrus Franciscus Huygels-Van Humbeeck.

== Urban context ==
In 2023, the city of Antwerp began redesigning parts of the Markgravelei area to improve pedestrian access, introduce more greenery, and reduce car traffic.

== Notable buildings ==
- Markgravelei 88–90: Eclectic corner house by Ernest Dieltiens (1912), protected heritage.
- Markgravelei 107: Art Deco building by Jos Bascourt (1933).
- Markgravehuis: Historic hospice linked to the origin of the street's name (no longer extant, but commemorated).

== Heritage status ==
The Markgravelei is part of the thematic heritage inventory "Leikwartier en omgeving", which documents the urban expansion south of Antwerp in the 19th century. The area's heritage value is recognized for its cohesive architectural quality and urban planning.

== See also ==
- Architecture of Belgium
- History of Antwerp
