= Chopin (vodka) =

Single-ingredient vodka

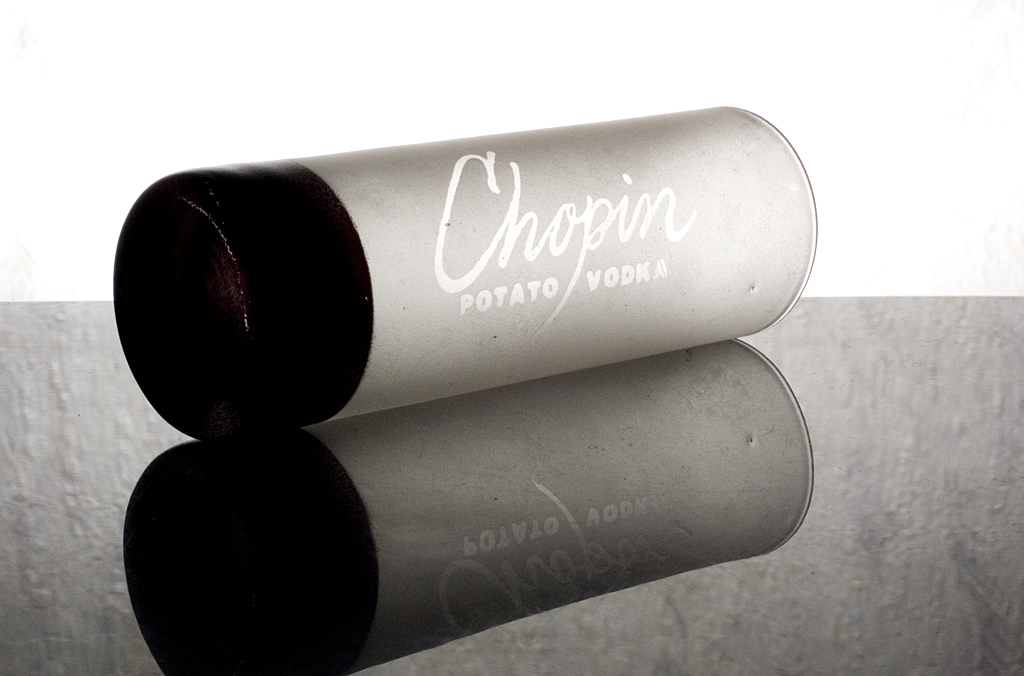
- Type: Vodka
- Manufacturer: Polmos Siedlce
- Country of origin: Poland
- Introduced: 1992 1997 (North America)
- Alcohol by volume: 40%
- Proof (US): 80
- Website: www.chopinvodka.com

Chopin is a single-ingredient vodka, 4 times distilled from either potatoes, rye or wheat. It is produced by Siedlce-based distiller Podlaska Wytwórnia Wódek Polmos. Chopin was first introduced to North America in 1997. The production is done in small batches. The producer claims three kilograms (seven pounds) of potatoes are used to make every bottle of Chopin.

The vodka is named after the famous Romantic composer Frédéric Chopin.

Chopin potato vodka has been submitted to a number of international spirit ratings for evaluation, including the San Francisco World Spirits Competition, Wine Enthusiast, and the Beverage Testing Institute. Outcomes have generally been favorable, particularly after 2005. For instance, between 2006 and 2011, Chopin potato vodka earned one double gold, three gold, and two silver medals from the San Francisco World Spirits Competition. Proof66's aggregate rating, which incorporated these scores and others, put the spirit in the 90th percentile among all rated vodkas.

== See also ==
- List of vodkas
