= Wódka Żołądkowa Gorzka =

Polish vodka

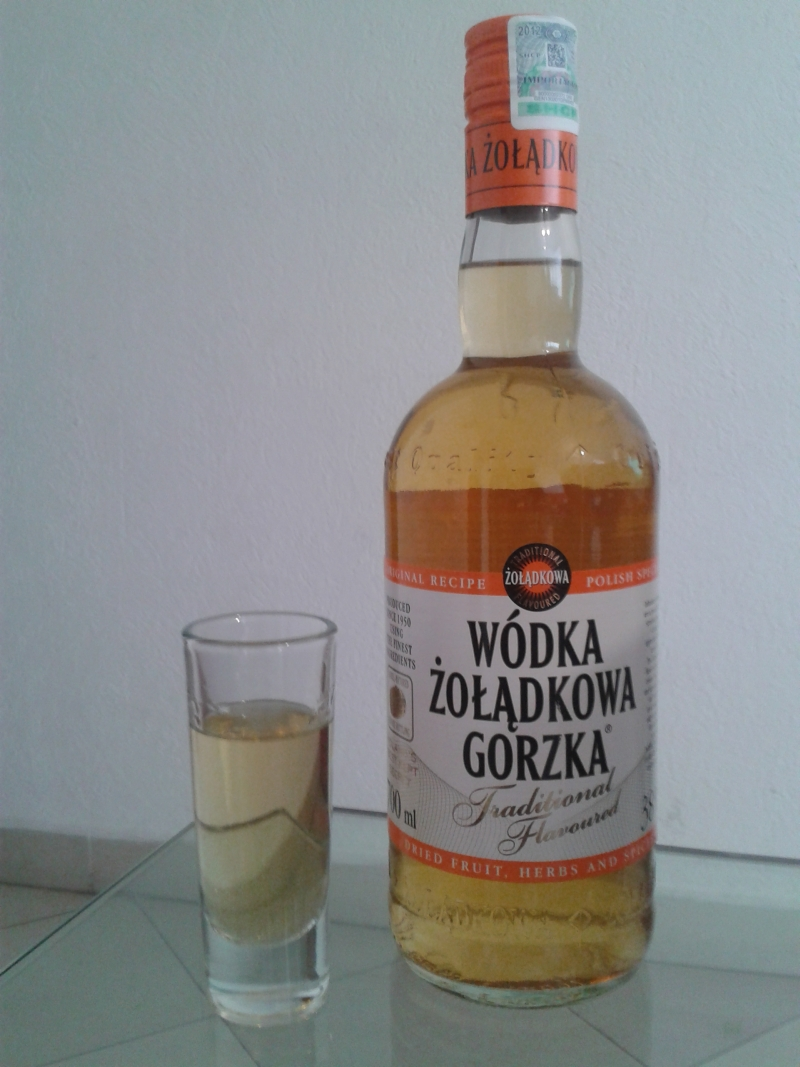
- Type: Herbal Vodka
- Manufacturer: Polmos Lublin
- Origin: Lublin, Poland
- Introduced: 1950, though based on a much older recipe
- Alcohol by volume: 32% (since 2024); 40% (traditionally)
- Variants: Żołądkowa Gorzka; Żołądkowa Gorzka z miętą Żołądkowa Gorzka z miodem Żołądkowa Gorzka De Luxe; Żołądkowa Gorzka na trawie żubrowej Jęczmienna Żołądkowa Gorzka
- Related products: List of vodkas

Wódka Żołądkowa Gorzka (Polish pronunciation: [ˈvutka ˌʐɔwɔntˈkɔva ˈɡɔʂka]) − colloquially shortened to Żołądkowa Gorzka or Żołądkowa − is an herbal vodka from Poland, and the leading brand of Polmos-Lublin/Stock Polska since 1950.

The name translating as "bitter stomach vodka", Żołądkowa Gorzka follows in a long Polish tradition of infused fruit and herb vodkas known as nalewka. The traditional Polish practice of producing nalewka dates back to at least the 16th century and is typically done at home, but there are several commercial brands including Żołądkowa Gorzka.

The brand has enjoyed popularity among consumers and has been introduced to international markets. In addition to Poland, Żołądkowa Gorzka is available in the USA, Australia, United Kingdom, Canada, Germany and Spain. In 2012, the Czysta de Luxe variant was the ninth-most popular vodka in the world, by sales.

Żołądkowa Gorzka has received several awards, including the Oskar FMCG 2006 award, a CoolBrands award, the gold medal at Poznan International Fair POLAGRA 2000, the Grand Gold Quality Award en 2009 and 3 Golden Stars of International Taste & Quality Institute Awards 2013.

In 2009, Polmos changed the bottle design for a more modern one that is still inspired by the original and traditional bottle.

In 2011, alcohol by volume content was reduced from 40% to 38%. In 2013, alcohol by volume was further reduced to 36%. In 2024, alcohol by volume was again reduced, this time to 32%.

== Taste ==
Despite its name, Żołądkowa Gorzka is a sweet, amber-coloured vodka with a spiced aroma and herbal flavor. This is marketed as its "traditional" variety (Żołądkowa Gorzka Tradycyjna).

The Żołądkowa Gorzka brand is now used also for other types of vodka, loosely or not associated with the traditional product, in flavour variations:

- Wódka Żołądkowa Gorzka z Miętą, with added peppermint. Introduced in 2005.
- Żołądkowa Gorzka z Miodem, with added Polish honey. Introduced in 2006.
- Wódka Żołądkowa Gorzka Czysta de Luxe, clear. Introduced in 2007.
- Wódka Żołądkowa Gorzka na trawie Żubrowej, with bison grass. Introduced in 2009.
- Wódka Żołądkowa Gorzka z Czarną Wiśnią, with black cherry. Introduced in 2014.
