= Starka =

Distilled alcoholic beverage

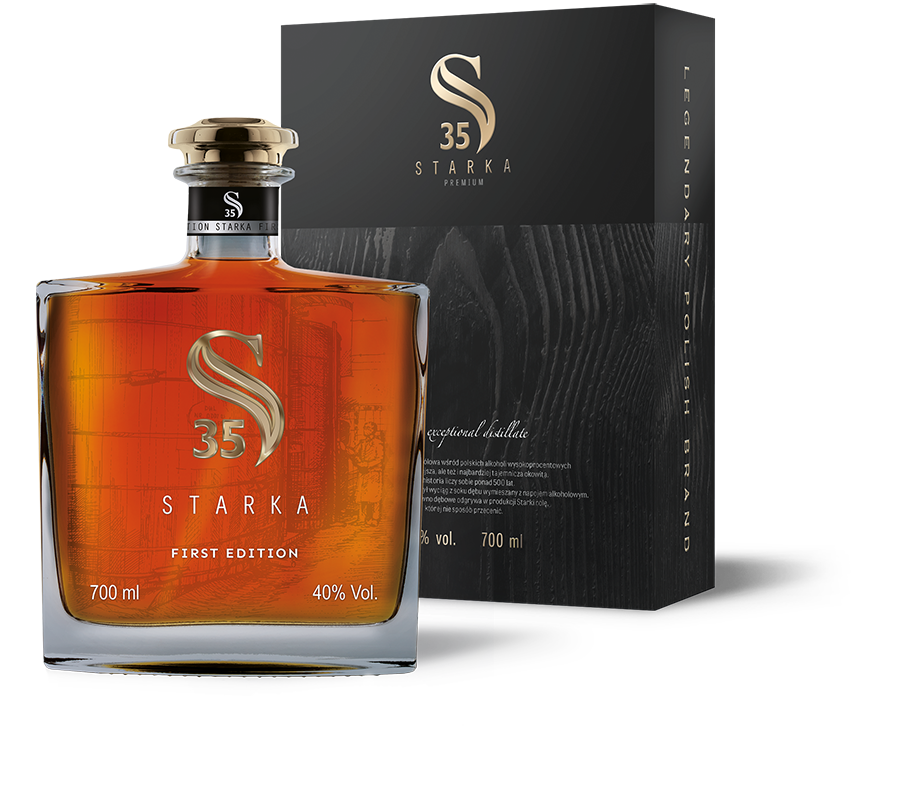
- Manufacturer: Szczecińska Fabryka Wódek "Starka"
- Origin: Poland, Lithuania, Belarus
- Introduced: 15th century
- Alcohol by volume: 40–50%
- Variants: Starka from 3 to 50 years old Herbal Starka
- Website: www.polmos.szczecin.pl

Starka is a type of distilled alcoholic beverage made from fermented rye mash. Traditionally, Starka is made from natural (up to 2 distillations, no rectification) rye spirit and aged in oak barrels with small additions of linden-tree and apple-tree leaves. The production methods are similar to those used in making rye whisky. Sold in various grades, the most notable difference between them is the length of the aging period, varying from 3 to over 50 years, and the natural color, which is obtained from the reaction between the alcohol and the oak barrel, not from the additives.

== History ==
Starka was known in Poland and Lithuania at least since the 15th century, later in the Polish–Lithuanian Commonwealth, and by the 17th century became one of the favorite drinks of the nobility of the Commonwealth and Sarmatist culture. Tradition had it that at a child's birth, the father of the house poured large amounts of home-made spirits (approximately 75 proof) into an empty oak barrel, previously used to store wine (usually imported from Hungary at that time and hence called Węgrzyn, or Hungarian). The barrel was then sealed with beeswax and buried, only to be dug out at the child's wedding. The name itself stems from this aging process, and in 15th-century Polish it meant both the vodka type and an old woman. Alternatively the name is derived from the Lithuanian word "Starkus", as Starka production is associated with birth.

In the late 19th century, various companies (mostly in Imperial Russia and Austria-Hungary) slightly simplified the production process and adapted it to mass production, as did the Lwów-based Baczewski company. After World War I, which ended foreign rule over former parts of the Polish–Lithuanian Commonwealth, starka remained one of the most popular spirits in both countries. After World War II, when Lithuania was under the Soviet Union, starka production continued in the "Vilniaus degtinė" and "Stumbras" (Kaunas) factories. In Poland, all spirit producers were nationalized, but starka production continued, mostly as a high-priced export good.

Currently, Szczecińska Fabryka Wódek "Starka" (formerly Polmos Szczecin) is the only company to produce Starka in Poland, and it offers it in all age classes, from 3 to 50 years old, though the oldest Starkas date back to 1947. All Starkas produced by Szczecińska Fabryka Wódek "Starka" contain 40%–50% alcohol by volume. There is also a number of other companies (most notably in Lithuania, Bulgaria, Kazakhstan, Russia, Latvia and United States) that produce vodkas styled after the starka (produced mostly from a mixture of rectified spirit and herbal tinctures).
