= Centrum Marszałkowska =

Office and retail building in Warsaw, Poland

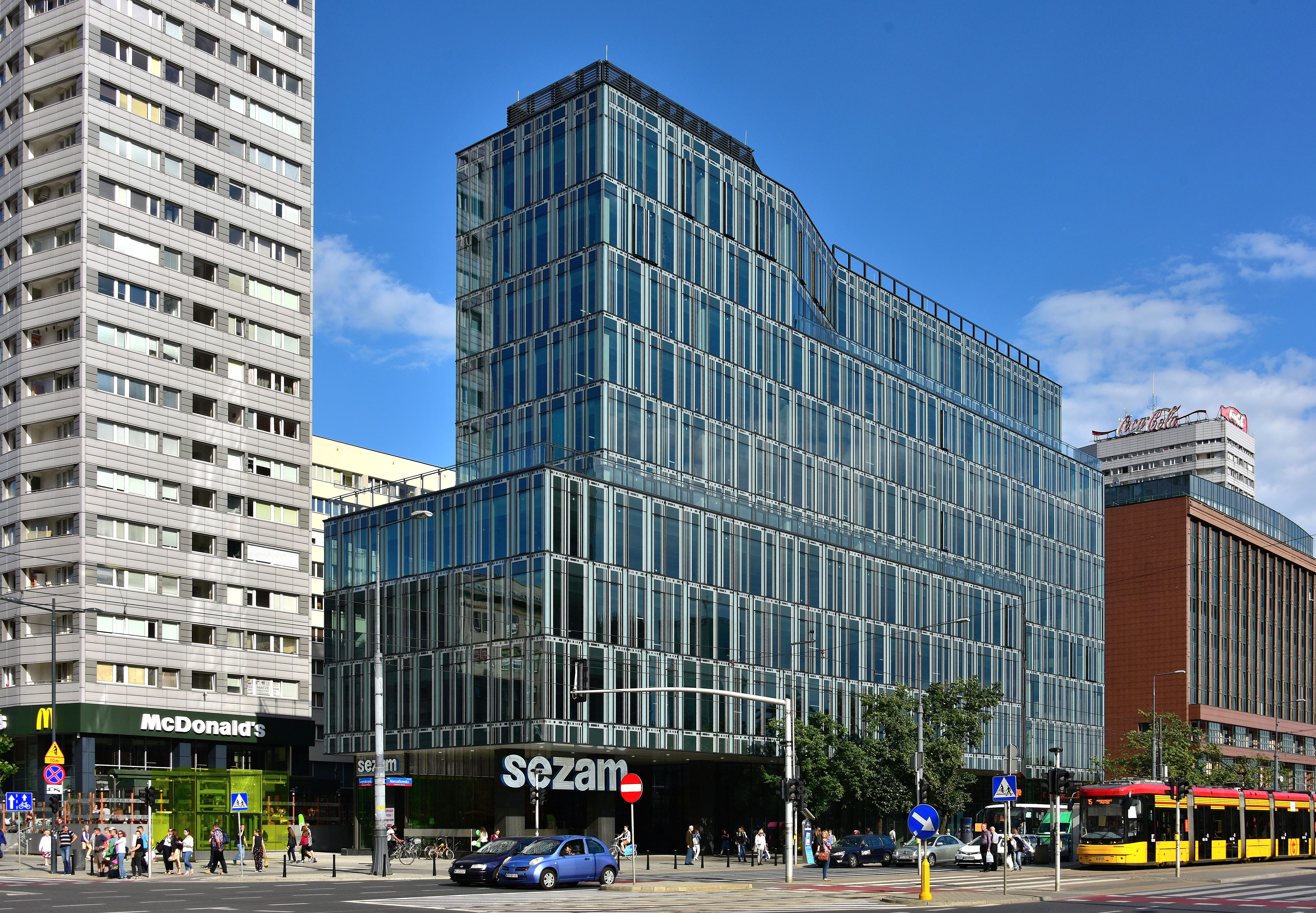
- Centrum Marszałkowska in 2018.

General information
- Type: Office and retail building
- Location: 126 and 134 Marszałkowska Street, Downtown, Warsaw, Masovian Voivodeship, Poland
- Coordinates: 52°14′06″N 21°00′33″E
- Construction started: April 2016
- Completed: May 2018

Height
- Tip: 40 m (131.23 ft)
- Roof: 40 m (131.23 ft)

Technical details
- Floor count: 11 (+3 underground)
- Floor area: 16,500 m^{2} (177,604.52 sq ft)

Design and construction
- Architecture firm: Juvenes Projekt
- Developer: BBI Development NFI
- Main contractor: Korporacja Budowlana Doraco

Other information
- Public transit: Świętokrzyska

Centrum Marszałkowska (Polish: [ˈt͡sɛn.trum mar.ʂawˈkɔf.ska]; lit. 'Marshal Street Centre'), colloquially also known as Nowy Sezam (Polish: [ˈnɔ.vɘ̟ ˈsɛ.zam]; lit. 'New Sesame'), is an office and retail building in the city of Warsaw in Masovian Voivodeship, Poland, located in the neighbourhood of North Downtown, at 126 and 134 Marszałkowska Street. It was opened in 2018.

== History ==
The building was designed by the architecture firm Juvenes Projekt, and constructed by the company Korporacja Budowlana Doraco, as the investment of BBI Development NFI. It was built in place of the department store Sezam. The construction works begun in April 2016, with a cornerstone being placed on 7 December 2016, and lasted until May 2016. The investment cost 83.53 million Polish zloties. On 6 June 2016, the supermarket store Sezam was opened in the building, operating there until 2025.

== Characteristics ==
The building has 11 storeys, with additional 3 underground, and a total height of 40 m (131.23 ft). It has a total floor area of 16,500 m^{2} (177,604.52 sq ft), of which 13,100 m^{2} (141.007.23 sq ft) is decided to office spaces, with rest designated for stores and services, placed on the first two floors, and in one underground storey. It includes an underground garage with 112 car spaces. The building is integrated with an entrance to the Świętokrzyska metro station.
