= Plac Unii =

Skyscraper in Warsaw, Poland

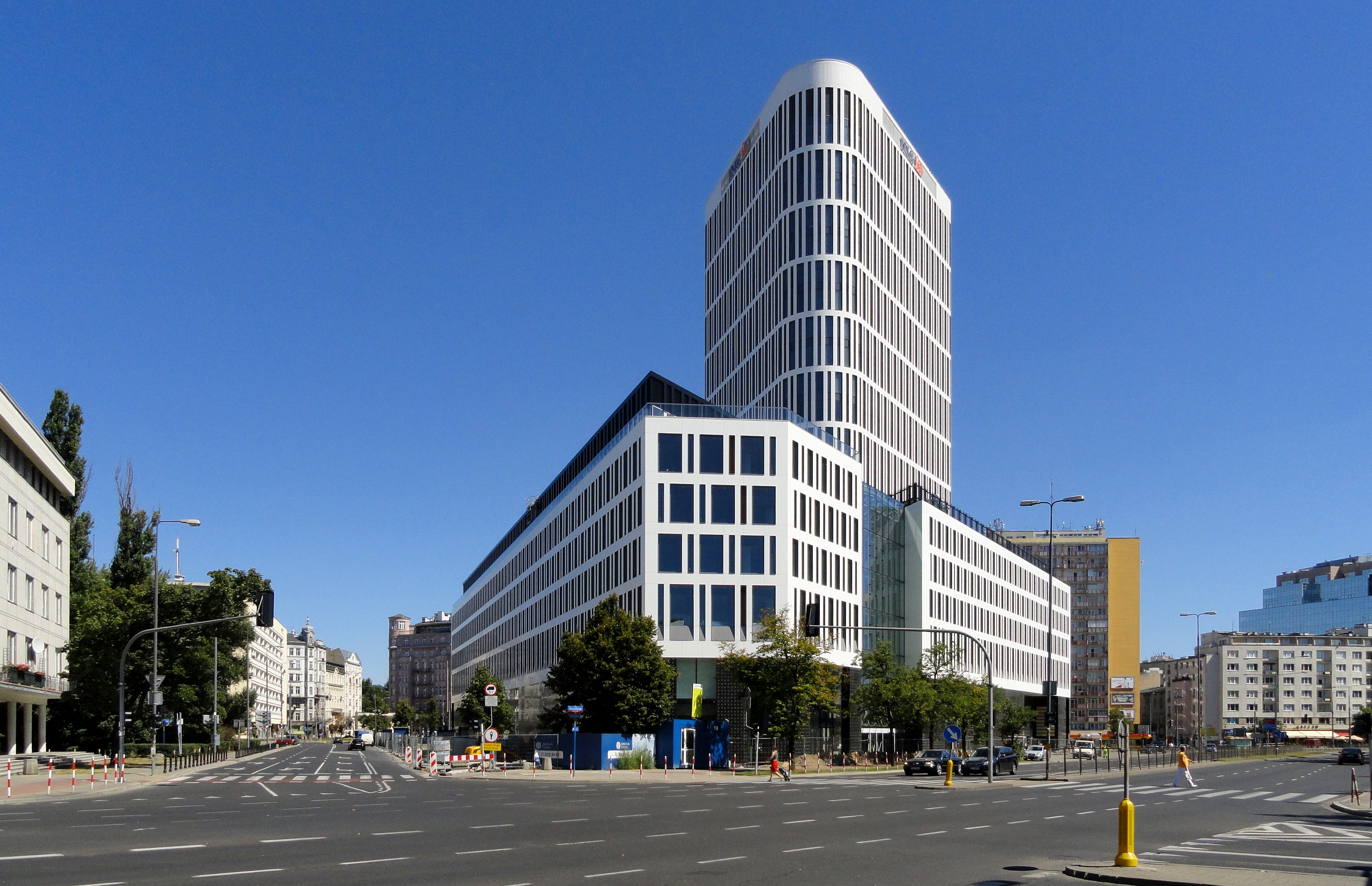
- Plac Unii in 2013, as seen form the intersection of Boya-Żeleńskiego and Waryńskiego Streets.
- Interactive map of the Plac Unii area

General information
- Type: Office building and shopping centre
- Location: Mokotów, Warsaw, Poland, 2 Puławska Street
- Coordinates: 52°12′45″N 21°01′12″E
- Construction started: September 2010
- Completed: 12 October 2013
- Owner: Invesco Real Estate

Height
- Tip: 90 m
- Roof: 90 m

Technical details
- Floor count: 22 (+4 underground)
- Floor area: 57,000 m²

Design and construction
- Architect: Stefan Kuryłowicz
- Architecture firm: APA Kuryłowicz & Associates
- Developer: Liebrecht & wooD; BBI Development NFI
- Main contractor: Warbud

Plac Unii (Polish pronunciation: [ˈplat͡s ˈuɲ.ji]; lit. 'Union Square') is a skyscraper in Warsaw, Poland, located at 2 Puławska Street, next to the Union of Lublin Square. It operates as an office building and a shopping centre. It was opened in 2013 and is 22 storeys tall, with a total height of 90 m.

== History ==
Plac Unii was constructed in place of the Supersam store, which was deconstructed in 2006. The building, opened in 1962, was the first supermarket in Poland and was considered a notable example of modern architecture in Poland. The Supersam store chain remained present in the new building until 2022.

The building was developed by Liebrecht & wooD and BBI Development NFI, and designed by a team from the APA Kuryłowicz & Associates architecture firm, led by Stefan Kuryłowicz. Its construction lasted from 2010 to 2013, with Warbud as the main contractor. It was officially opened on 12 October 2013. In 2014, it was sold to Invesco Real Estate for 226 million euros.

== Characteristics ==
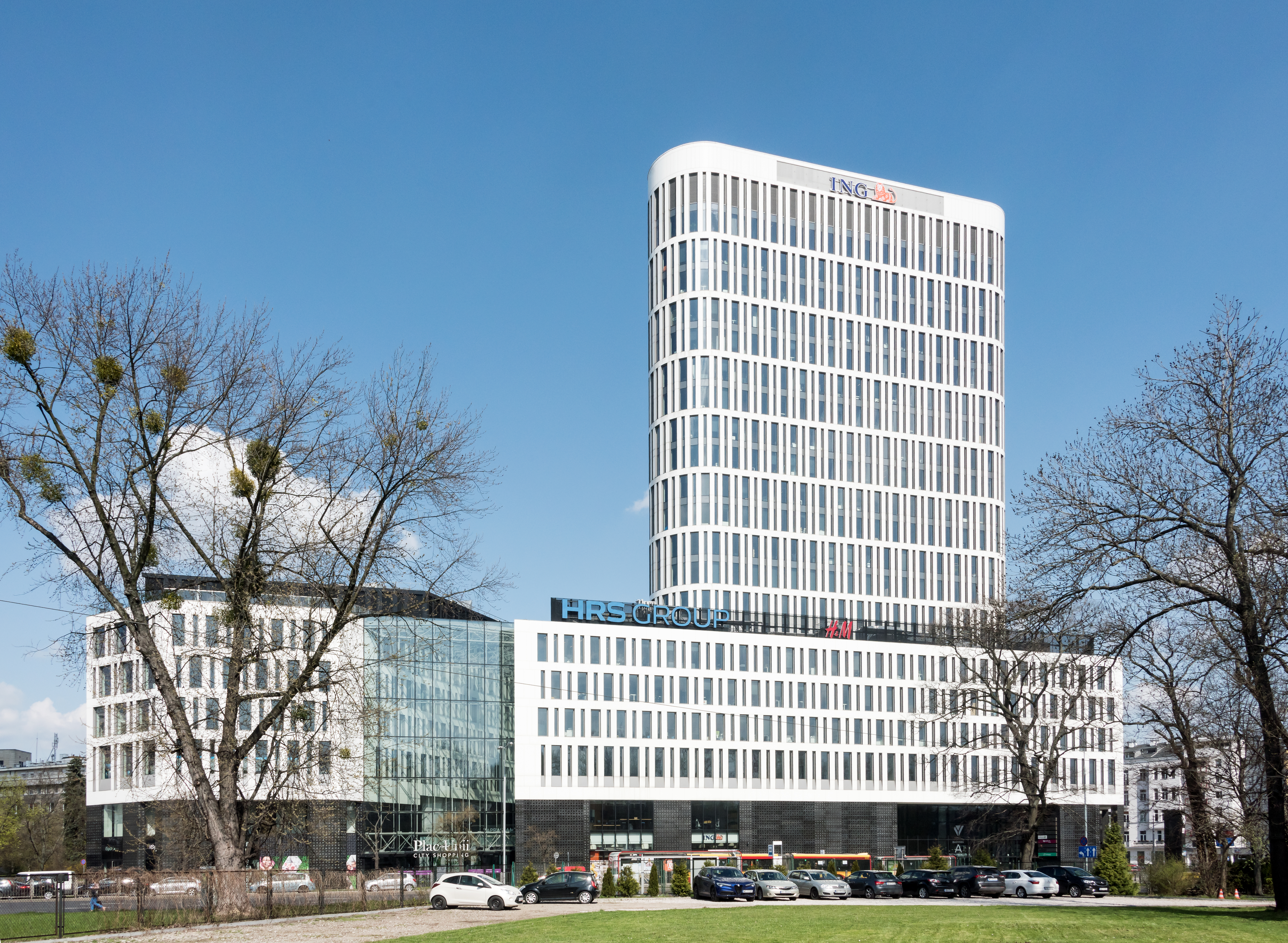
Plac Unii in 2021 as seen from Waryńskiego Street.

Plac Unii is located at 2 Puławska Street, next to the Union of Lublin Square (Polish: Plac Unii Lubelskiej), which is its namesake. It is a complex of three buildings. It includes a 22-storey-tall tower with a height of 90 m, and two smaller buildings on its sides, each being 6 storeys tall with a height of 30 m. They are connected together by 30-metre-tall pathways with glass roofs and walls. The elevation on the first storey is made out of black polished granite. The elevation on the higher levels is covered in white tiles, made out of a mixture of ground marble and glass.

It has a total floor area of 57,000 m^{2}. The majority of the building is dedicated to office spaces, with a floor area of 46,000 m^{2}. The remaining area is dedicated to the Plac Unii shopping centre, which has an area of 11,000 m^{2} and occupies first two storeys, as well as an underground section. In 2020, there were 45 stores and 8 restaurants and coffeehouses.
