= KS Cracovia (disambiguation) =

KS Cracovia is a football club. It might also refer to:

- KS Cracovia (basketball)
- KS Cracovia (handball)
- KS Cracovia (ice hockey)
