= Cracovia (vodka) =

Polish vodka brand

- Type: Vodka
- Manufacturer: Polmos Kraków
- Origin: Poland
- Introduced: 1995
- Alcohol by volume: 40%
- Proof (US): 80
- Related products: List of vodkas

Cracovia is Polish brand of vodka produced by distillery Polmos Kraków since 1995.

There are three varieties of this vodka:

- Cracovia Classic, 40% abv
- Cracovia Supreme, 42% abv
- Cracovia Very Old, 40% abv – dry mixed vodka aged in oak barrels
