= Absolwent =

Polish vodka brand

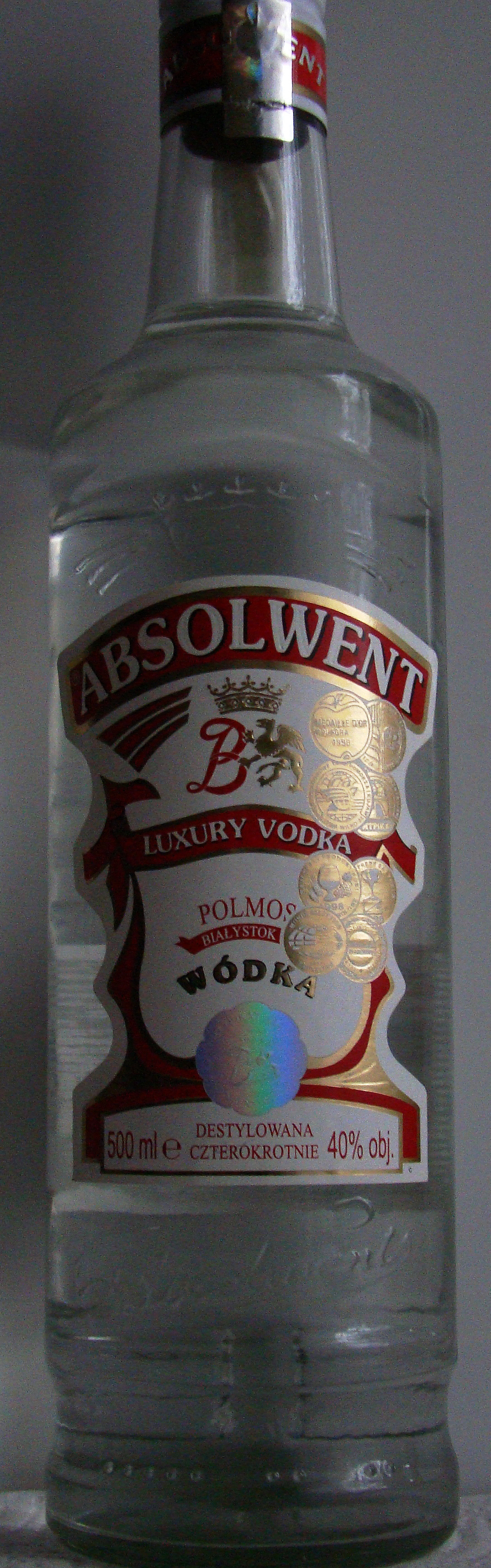
- Type: Vodka
- Manufacturer: Polmos Białystok
- Origin: Poland
- Introduced: 1995
- Alcohol by volume: 40%
- Proof (US): 80
- Related products: List of vodkas

A version for export, where the name has been translated to "Graduate"

Absolwent is a Polish luxury vodka manufactured since 1995 by Polmos Białystok. Produced as a 4-fold rectified grain high-end spirit. It is made in several varieties: pure, flavor (such as lemon, apricot, cranberry and banana) and Absolwent Gin. According to the company's report from 1999, Absolwent ranks fifth in the world. In 2005, it was the best-selling vodka in Poland in terms of sales (14% of the market). In 2012, Absolwent was the nineteenth most popular vodka in the world, by sales.
