= Siwucha vodka =

Brand of Vodka

Siwucha
- Type: Vodka
- Manufacturer: Polmos Zielona Góra
- Origin: Poland
- Introduced: Inspired by traditional Polish vodka from centuries ago; first appeared as a brand not long before World War I; current variant has been in production since 1996.
- Alcohol by volume: 40%
- Proof (US): 80
- Related products: List of vodkas

Siwucha (Polish pronunciation: [ɕiˈvuxa]) is an incompletely rectified vodka (raw vodka) from Poland. The name derives from the siwy (ash grey) color of the liquid due to Tyndall effect of the colloid emulsion of residual fusel oil.

== History ==
Siwucha is one of the generic Slavic words for a moonshine. In Polish it denotes a home-brew vodka or rotgut used for its preparation. The name was first used as a vodka brand in Warsaw shortly before World War I. It was in production by various distilleries in Poland during the interbellum. After the World War II all distilleries were nationalised and its production was halted. In 1995 the Polmos distillery in Zielona Góra reintroduced it as a way to commemorate the 50th anniversary of the company's foundation.

It is sold in 0.5 litre bottles, corked and sealed with sealing wax.

== Technology ==
The vodka is composed of a mixture of two rectified grain spirits. The mixture is then seasoned in oak barrels and a scent of forest fruit flavour is added. Its specific flavor can be attributed to blackthorn extract.

== See also ==
- Moonshine
- Polish moonshine
- Vodka
