= Luksusowa =

Brand of Vodka from Poland

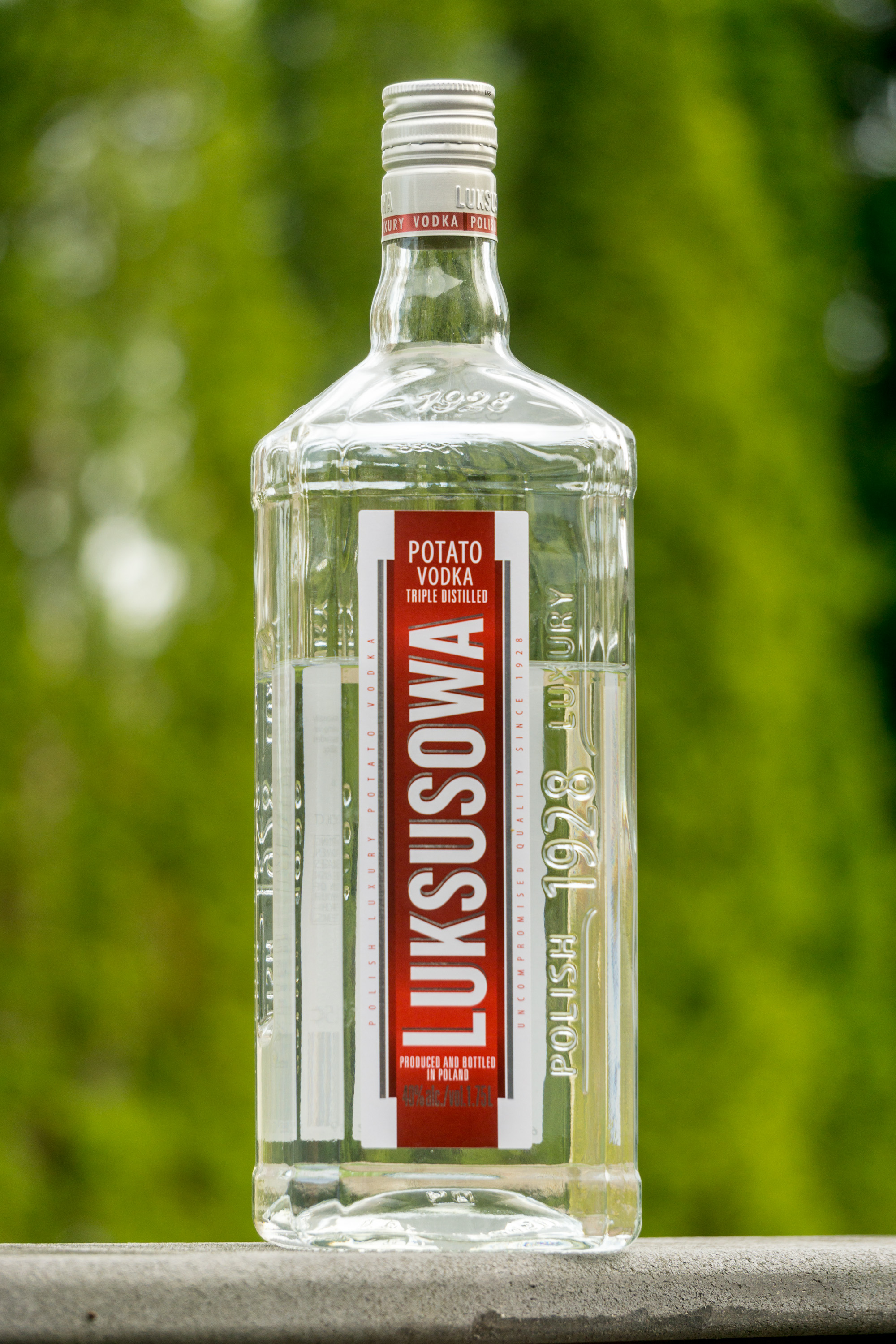
- 1.75L bottle, as sold in the United States
- Type: pure potato spirit Vodka
- Manufacturer: formerly state owned Polmos in Zielona Góra (Pernod-Ricard S.A.)
- Origin: Poland
- Introduced: 1928
- Alcohol by volume: 40%
- Proof (US): 80
- Related products: List of vodkas

Luksusowa Vodka (Polish: Wódka luksusowa) is a brand of vodka from Poland that is distilled from potatoes. The Polish word luksusowa means "luxury"; thus in English-language markets, it is also referred to as Luksusowa Luxury Vodka.

Luksusowa has been in continuous production since 1928, making it one of the oldest Polish vodkas. When Poland's boundaries were moved westward after World War II, Luksusowa's production was moved to its current site in Zielona Góra. According to its producer, Luksusowa accounts for approximately 10% of Poland's vodka market.

In 2010, W.J. Deutsch & Sons, Ltd. became the exclusive United States importer for Luksusowa.

Luksusowa vodkas are currently available in these varieties:

- Clear (traditional)
- Black (50% alcohol by volume, compared to 40% in the other varieties)
- Citrus (lemon-flavored)
- Wild Berry ("blackberries, raspberries, blueberries, cranberries, and a touch of wild cherry")
