= Żubrówka =

Vodka

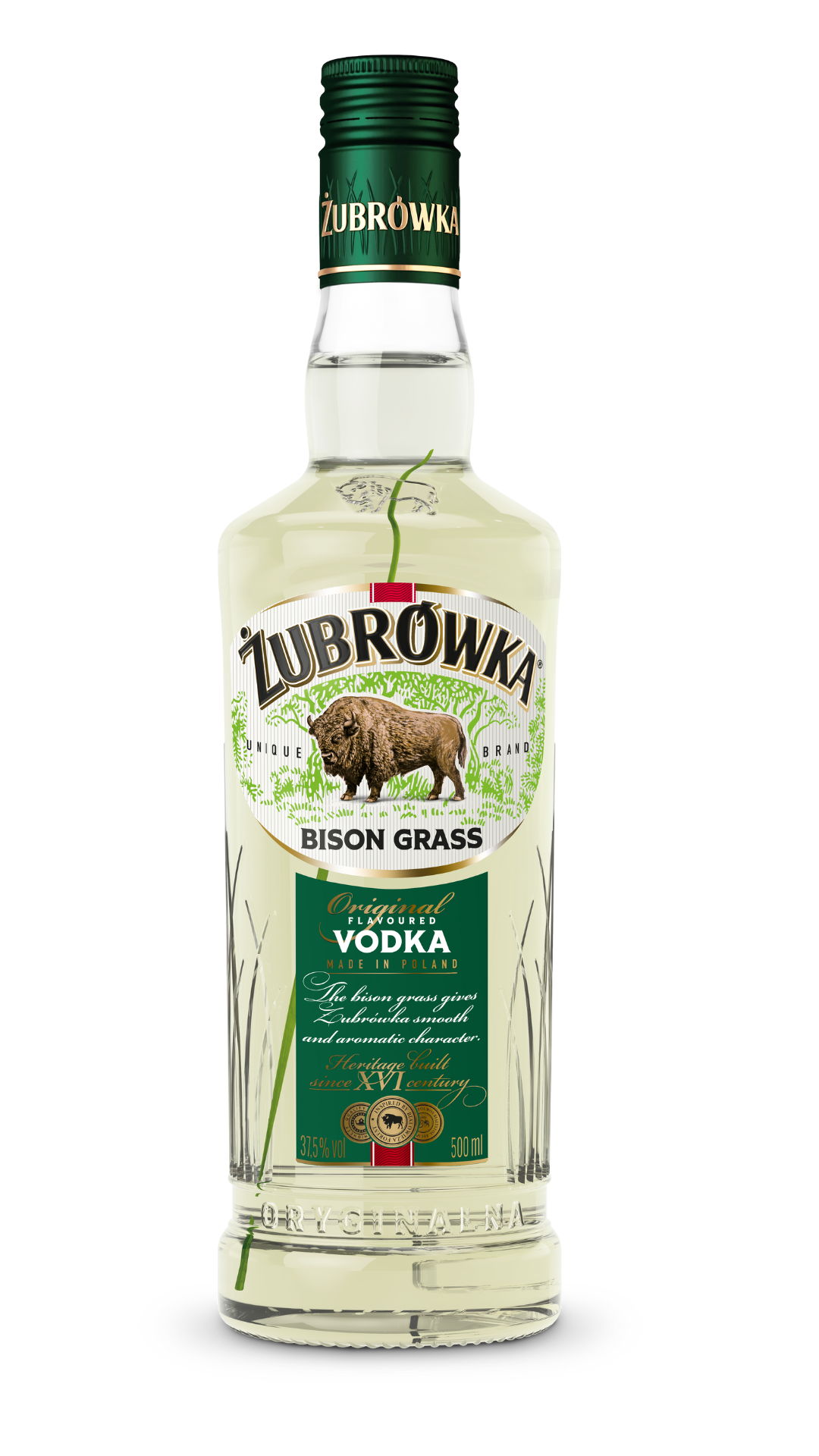
- A 700-millilitre (25 imp fl oz; 24 US fl oz) bottle of Żubrówka vodka
- Type: Flavored vodka
- Manufacturer: Polmos Białystok (Poland)
- Origin: Poland
- Proof (US): 80
- Website: zubrowka.com

Żubrówka Bison Grass Vodka (Polish pronunciation: [ʐuˈbrufka]) is a flavored Polish vodka which contains a blade of bison grass (Hierochloe odorata) in every bottle. The Żubrówka brand name is also used on bottles of conventional vodka, labeled as Żubrówka Biała. The grass is sourced from the Białowieża Forest, hand-picked and dried naturally.

The origins of Żubrówka production in Poland date back to the 16th century.

Żubrówka ranks as the third or fourth best-selling vodka brand in the world (after Smirnoff, Absolut, and occasionally Khortytsia). Żubrówka is available in more than 80 markets worldwide.

Żubrówka is manufactured at the Polmos Białystok distillery. While it is claimed that the recipe dates back to the 14th century, commercial production of Bison Grass Vodka began at the distillery in 1928. The brand is owned by Central European Distribution Corporation International, which Roust International acquired in 2013. Since 2022, it has been owned by the Maspex Group.

== Etymology and brand ==
In Polish, the word turówka is officially used for bison grass, while the name żubrówka has been used in folk terminology and colloquially. The name comes from the term zubr (Polish: żubr, pronounced [ʐubr]), the word for the European bison in many Slavic languages and Baltic languages.

The Żubrówka brand is registered in Poland by Roust International.

== Types ==
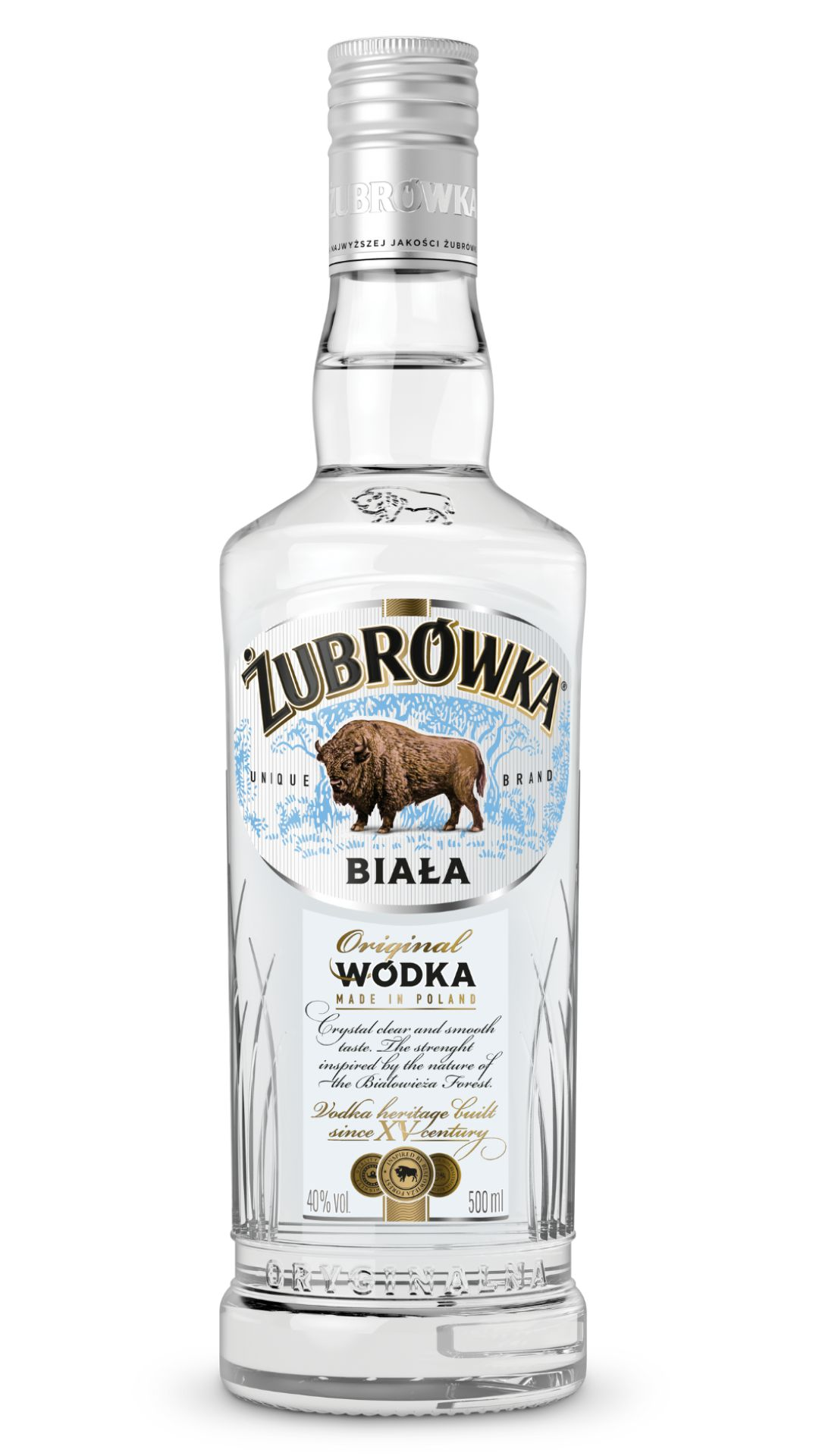
Żubrówka Biała

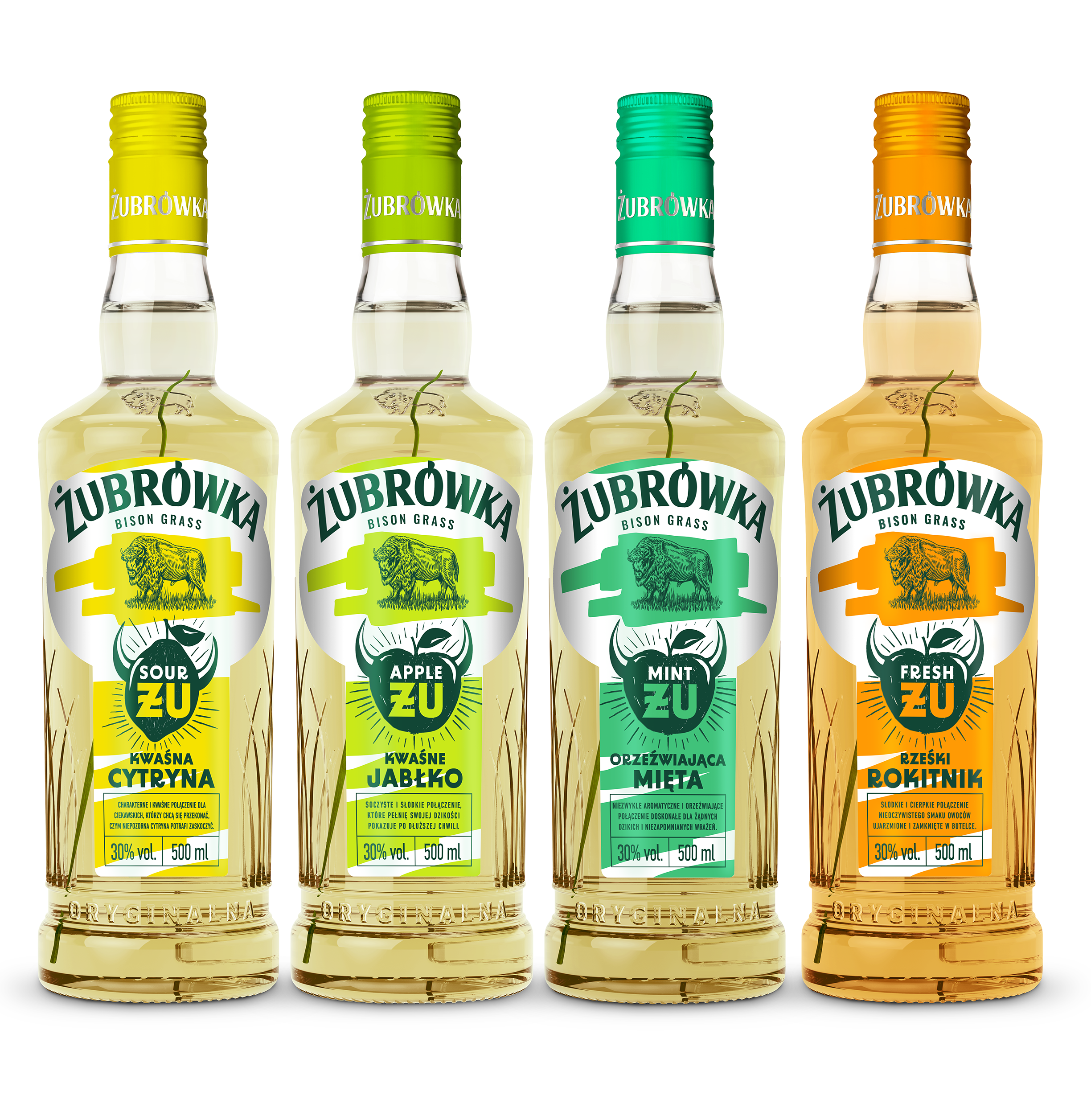
Żubrówka Fresh Żu

In Poland, the Żubrówka brand is also used to label other vodkas that are not żubrówka. Thirteen different varieties have appeared on the market under this brand:

- Żubrówka Bison Grass – Classic Żubrówka, produced according to traditional methods from oak barrel-matured bison grass macerate. Its characteristic feature is the blade placed in the bottle.
- Żubrówka Biała – pure, distilled six times and filtered using platinum; the variety is characterized by its mild taste.
- Żubrówka Czarna – vodka with a mild flavor due to charcoal and oak filtration and selected wheat.
- Linia Fresh Żu – Light, refreshing. A combination of juicy fruit and bison grass. Available in 4 flavors: Sour Apple, Refreshing Mint, Sour Lemon, Invigorating Sea Buckthorn.

== United States variant ==
Before 2010 Żubrówka was illegal in the United States because the grass it is made from contains coumarin which the FDA classifies as one of "substances generally prohibited from direct addition or use as human food". Since 2011, the manufacturers have made a version of Żubrówka from rye grain which aims to have a flavor similar to the original.

== Methods of consumption ==
Żubrówka is sometimes mixed with apple juice, preferably unfiltered. Known in Poland as szarlotka, literally "apple cake", overseas the drink is branded Apple ŻU and was included in Independent magazine's list of the Top 50 drinks in the world (other names for this drink include Tatanka, Bison Fire, and Apple Pie). Known in the UK as a Frisky Bison, and in the US as a Polish Kiss. It is sometimes served over vanilla ice cream, and another common mixer is ginger ale.

== See also ==
- List of vodkas
- Flavored liquor
