= Industrial architecture =

Type of architecture

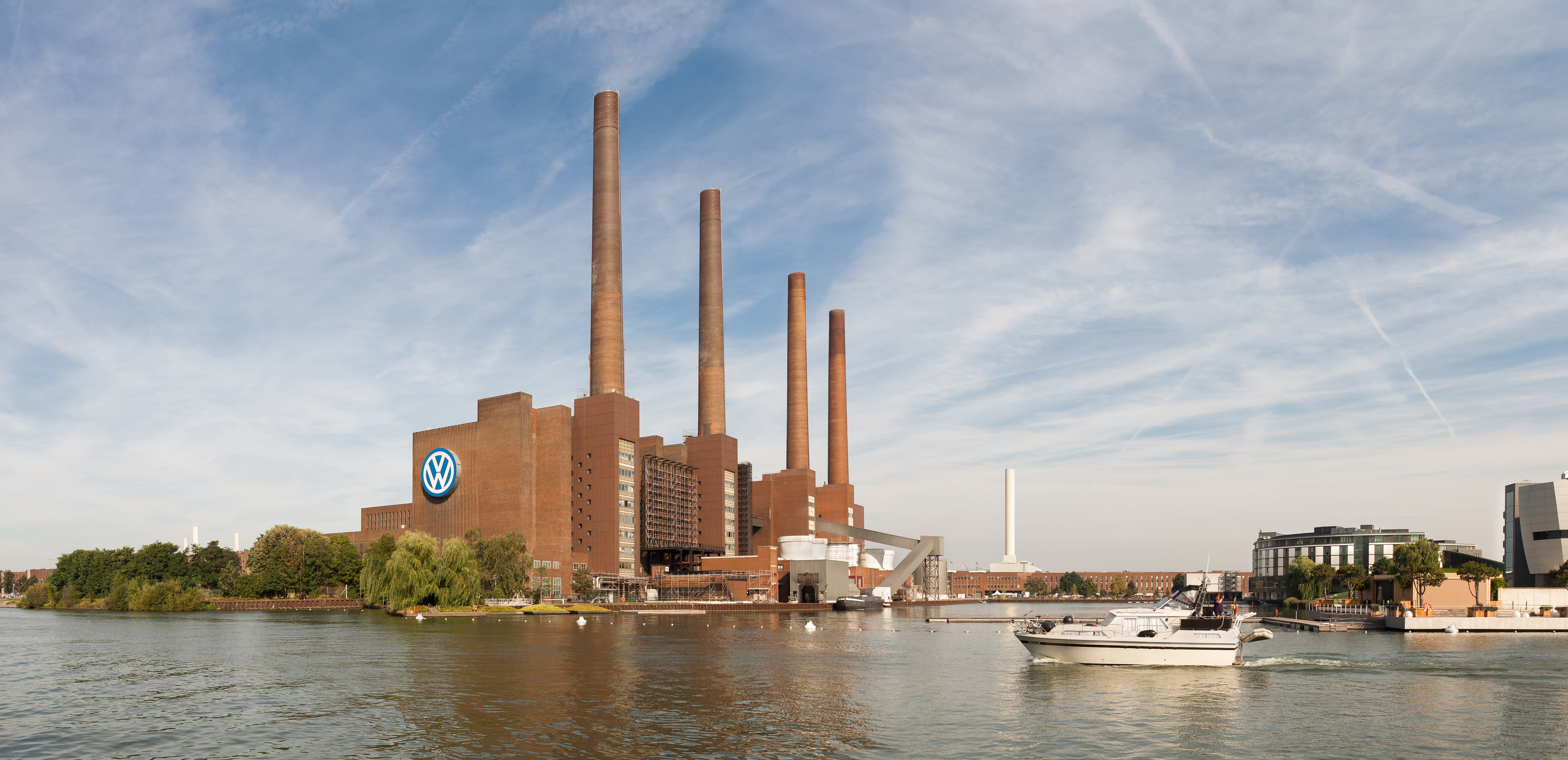
Volkswagen cogeneration plant in Wolfsburg, Germany, built in 1938 as part of the main Volkswagen factory

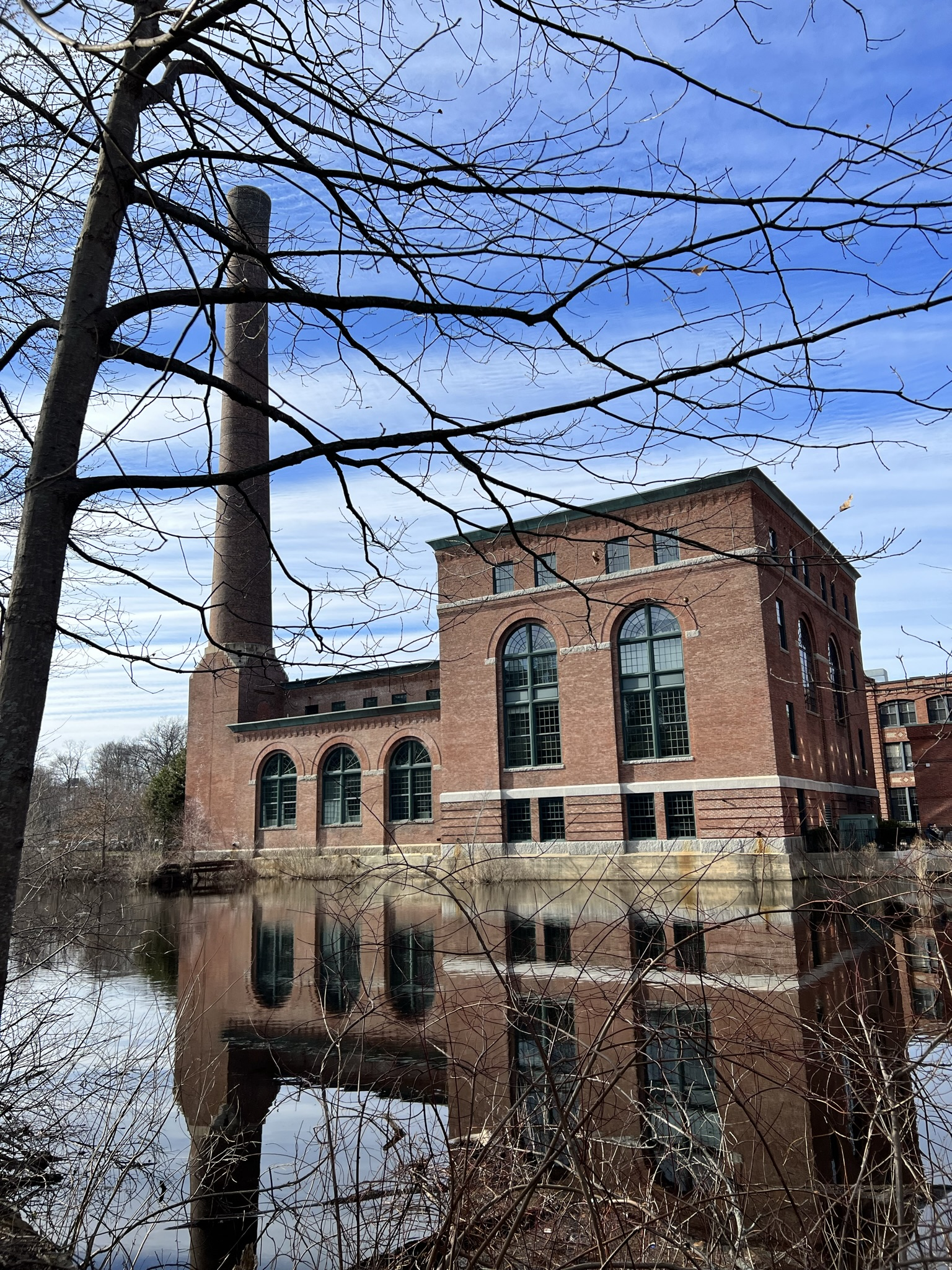
Walter Baker & Company located in Dorchester, Massachusetts along the Neponset River. The company was founded in 1780 and is one of the first companies in the United States to produce chocolate.

Industrial architecture is the design and construction of buildings facilitating the needs of the industrial sector. The architecture revolving around the industrial world uses a variety of building designs and styles to consider the safe flow, distribution and production of goods and labor. Such buildings rose in importance with the Industrial Revolution, starting in Britain, and were some of the pioneering structures of modern architecture. Many of the architectural buildings revolving around the industry allowed for processing, manufacturing, distribution, and the storage of goods and resources. Architects also have to consider the safety measures and workflow to ensure the smooth flow within the work environment located in the building.

== Industrial architect ==
Industrial architects specialize in designing and planning of industrial buildings or infrastructure. They integrate different processes, machinery, equipment and industrial building code requirements into functional industrial buildings. They follow quality standards to ensure that industrial buildings are safely built for production or human use. Industrial architects are responsible for the design and planning of the following: markets, warehouses, factories, processing plants, power plants, commercial facilities, etc.

== History ==
=== Industrial Revolution ===
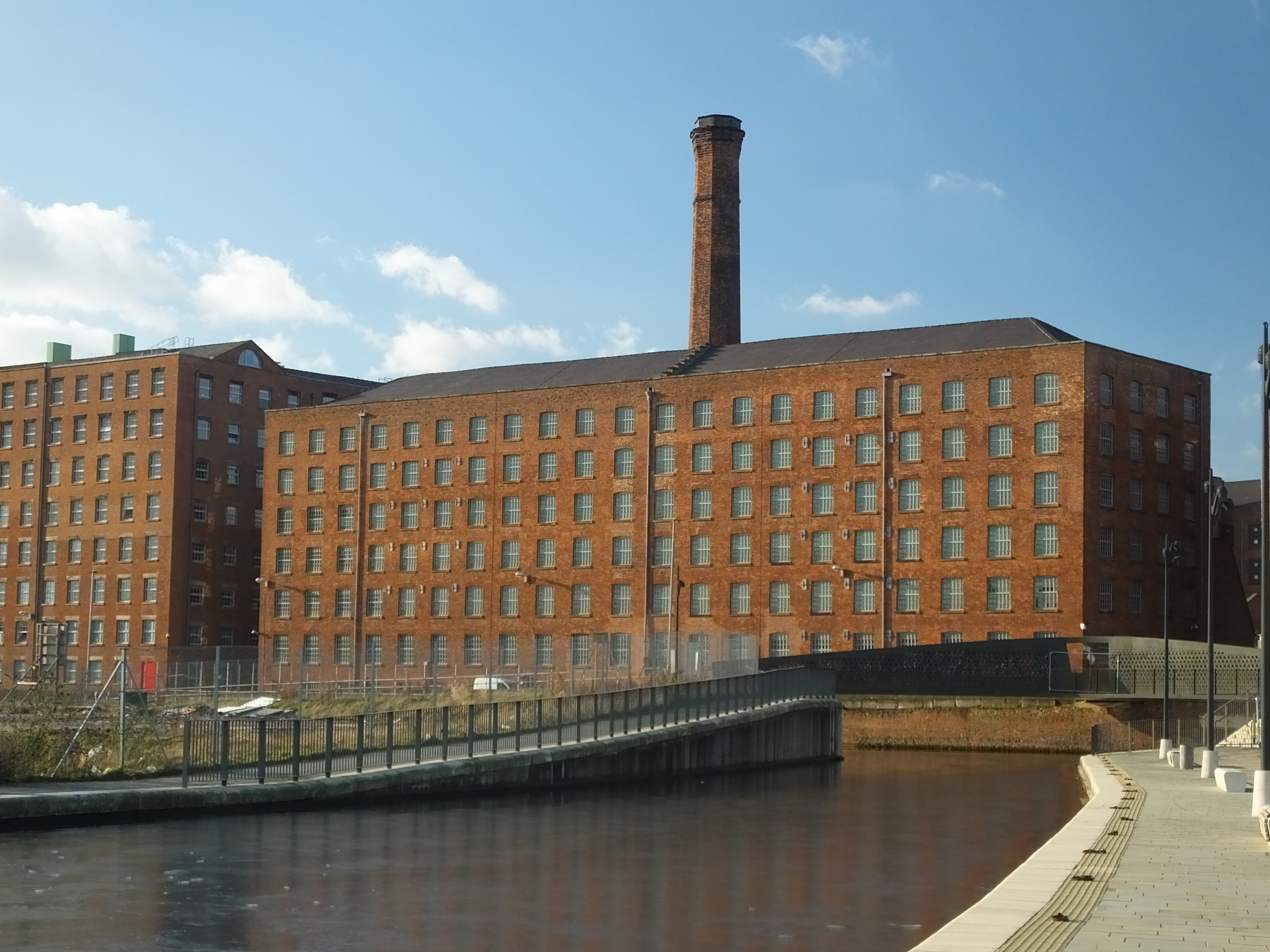
British industrial architecture: Murrays' Mills (for cotton) on the Rochdale Canal, Manchester, begun in 1797, and then forming the longest mill range in the world

Britain played an important role in the Industrial Revolution, which stimulated the expansion of trade and distribution of goods amongst Europe and the Atlantic Ocean. The technological advances from Europe were later spread to the United States in the late 1700s. Samuel Slater fled to the United States and later opened a textile mill in Rhode Island; shortly after that the cotton gin was invented by Eli Whitney.

One of the first industrial buildings was built in Britain in the 1700s during the First Industrial Revolution, which later inspired other industrial architecture to arise throughout the world. The First Industrial Revolution lasted from mid-1700s to the mid-1800s and then later the Second Industrial Revolution came about which mainly focused on the use of new materials and production of goods.

==== 1700s ====
One of the earliest industrial buildings were relatively built at a domestic scale, for instance workshops for local craftsmen.

==== 1700s–1850s ====
This time period was the transformation of the British economy. The population in England had increased to 16 million people around 1841, with the majority moving to Northern Europe. Factories had been built and production in the factories had become dominant; production was not on a large-scale.

=== Post-Industrial Revolution ===
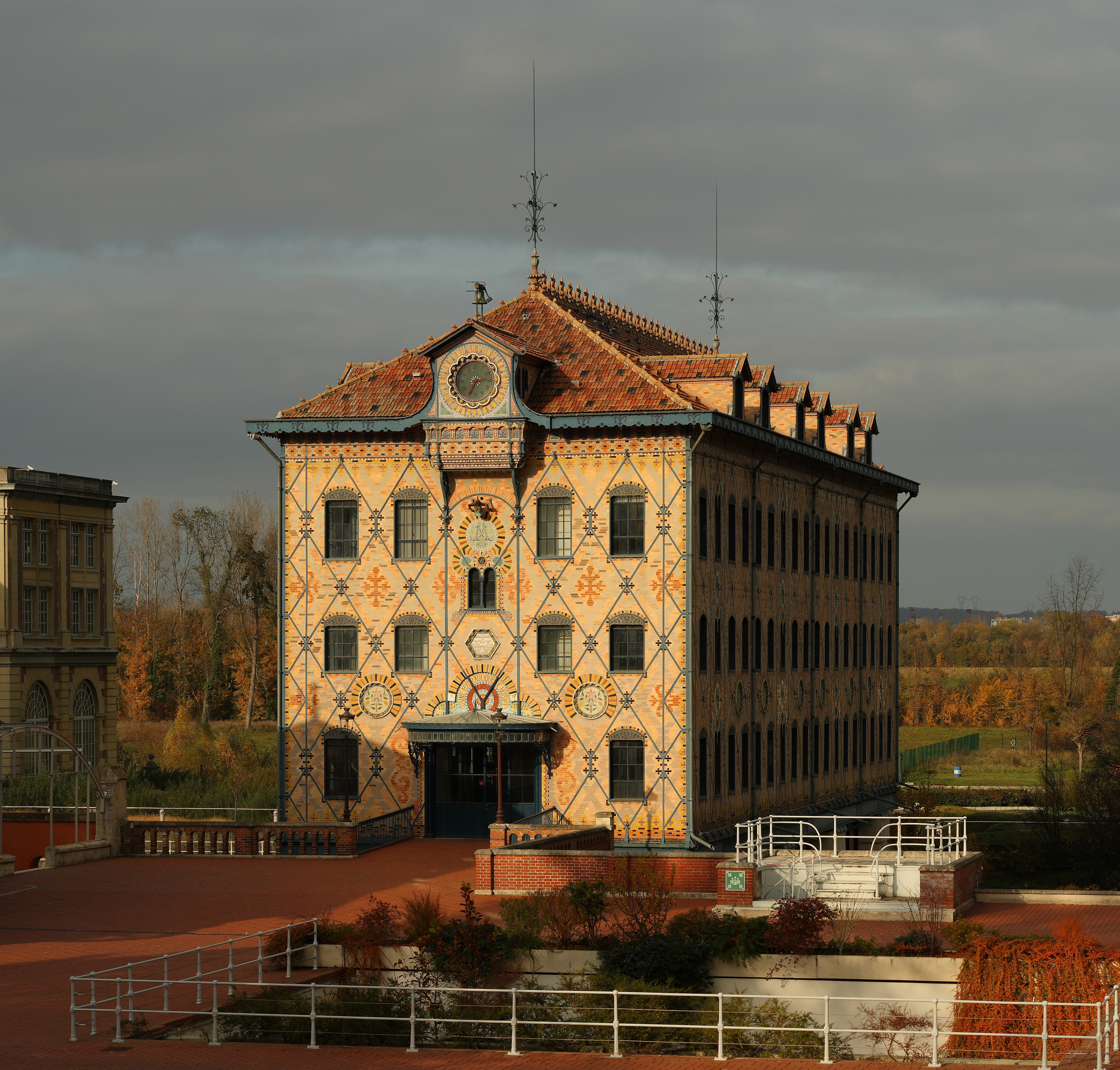
The Moulin Saulnier, originally a watermill, now part of the Menier chocolate factory in Noisiel, France. Built in 1872, it was the first building in the world with a visible metallic structure.

The birth of all industrial architecture stemmed from England and the continuing expansions of the architecture was a product of the Industrial Revolution. The usage and production of iron and steel became more prominent since they were used as the foundation for the industrial buildings. Steel is a durable material and was also used in other parts of the industry such as infrastructure, but it was difficult to make because it required high temperature to melt the metal.

==== 1850s–1914 ====
Britain saw an increase in production during this time period. Railways played an important role in transportation and distribution of resources throughout Europe and the United States. Industrial buildings were built at a larger scale to accommodate large machinery used in food production such as flour mills and breweries. With the implementation of the Housing, Town Planning, &c. Act 1909, the industry had a significant impact on the siting and layout of industrial facilities as it continued to progress throughout the years.

==== 1914 to present ====
As architecture became modernized throughout the years, the more traditional industrial sites throughout Europe and the United States continued to decrease. For instance, coal is a raw material that was heavily used throughout the industrial revolution, so there were coal mines. Buildings continued to increase in size to accommodate mass production. The overall design of modern-day buildings is sleeker and more spacious.

The early 20th century saw multi-story factories influenced by high land costs and the need for vertical movement of goods. However, later designs, such as the one-story factories of the World War II era, became more prevalent due to their flexibility, ease of construction, and suitability for assembly lines. These designs also focused on the well-being of workers, with features like natural light, air, and better working conditions to boost productivity.

=== The Future ===
Modern industrial architecture integrates smart technology, adaptable designs, and sustainable materials. Abandoned industrial spaces are frequently transformed into residential, commercial, or mixed-use developments, supporting urban revitalization. This design style, characterized by open layouts, exposed utilities, and eco-friendly materials, is popular in both urban and suburban settings, highlighting green living and historic charm. Repurposed structures play a key role in urban renewal, revitalizing neglected areas into thriving hubs for housing, businesses, and cultural activities.

The future of industrial architecture is influenced by technological advancements such as automation, robotics, and integration of smart systems, which enhance efficiency, productivity, and safety. As manufacturing evolves, industrial buildings will continue to adapt, with a focus on sustainability and collaborative work environments.

=== Some key elements to industrial buildings ===
Industrial buildings are typically characterized by large, open spaces, high ceilings, and minimal ornamentation, utilizing durable materials like concrete, brick, metal, and glass. The design prioritizes practicality, with elements like exposed structural components and raw materials. Functional principles include adaptability for changing production needs, efficient circulation, zoning for different tasks, and proper ventilation.

- High ceilings
- Functionality and design
- Large windows
- Large, open floor plans
- Built to safety standards

== Types of Industrial Buildings ==
- Brewery
- Distillery
- Drilling rig
- Factory
- Forge
- Foundry
- Gristmill
- Mine
- Power plant
- Refinery
- Sawmill
- Waterworks
- Warehouse

== See also ==
- Industrial heritage
