= Biała Dama =

Polish vodka

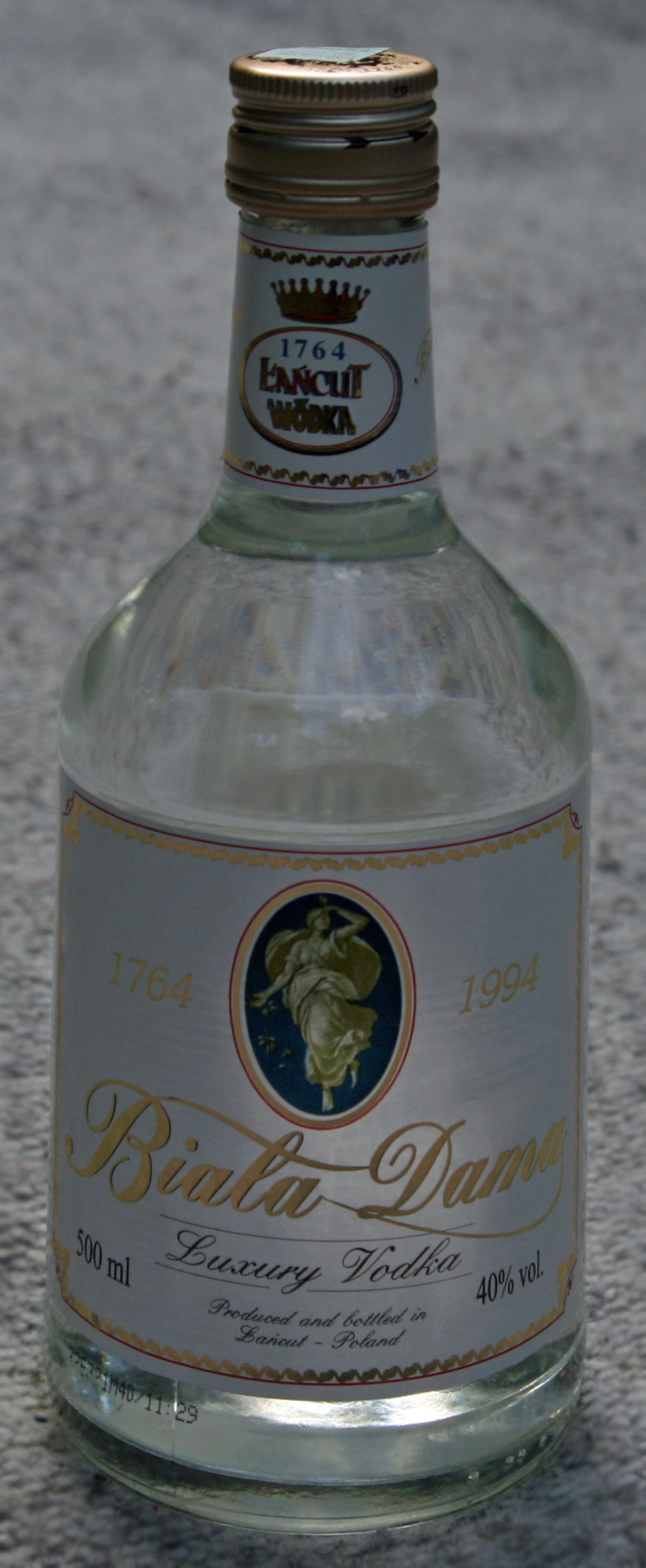
- Type: Vodka
- Manufacturer: Polmos Łańcut
- Origin: Łańcut, Poland
- Introduced: 1994
- Alcohol by volume: 40%
- Proof (US): 80
- Related products: List of vodkas

Biała Dama is an unflavored vodka produced by Polmos Łańcut. According to its producer it has delicate, unobtrusive aromatic note of neutral grain spirits. It contains 40% alcohol by volume.

The vodka has a tradition of more than 200 years. Biała Dama (pl: White Lady) refers to a ghost of Julia Potocka, whose mother established the distillery in Łańcut.

== See also ==
- Vodka
- Distilled beverage
- Polmos Łańcut
- List of vodkas
