= Wisent (vodka) =

Polish vodka

- Type: Flavoured Vodka
- Manufacturer: Polmos Łańcut
- Origin: Łańcut, Poland
- Introduced: Inspired by traditional Żubrówka vodka from the 16th century
- Alcohol by volume: 40%
- Proof (US): 80
- Related products: List of vodkas

Wisent is a flavoured vodka produced by Polmos Łańcut in Poland which features bison grass. It contains 40% alcohol by volume.

== See also ==
- Żubrówka
