= Soplica =

Polish vodka brand

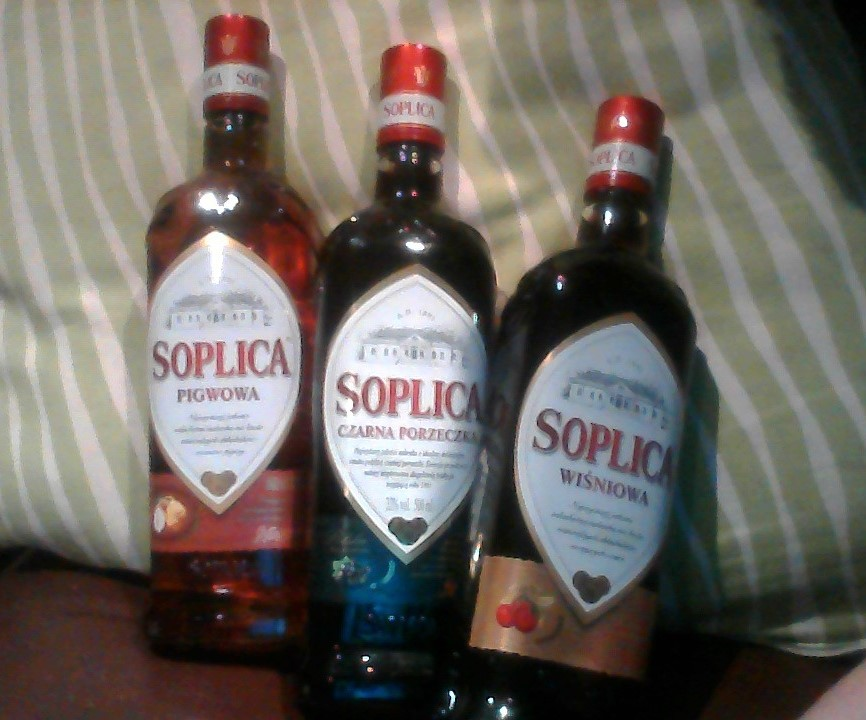
- Three flavoured variants of Soplica vodka
- Type: Vodka
- Manufacturer: Polmos Łańcut
- Origin: Poland
- Introduced: 1891
- Alcohol by volume: 40% (pure vodka); 27% (nalewka); 60% (nalewka spirit)
- Proof (US): 80 (pure vodka); 54 (nalewka); 120 (nalewka spirit)
- Related products: List of vodkas
- Website: soplica.pl

Soplica (Polish pronunciation: [sɔplitsa]) is a brand of Polish pure and flavoured vodka, first produced in 1891 (in a factory that was opened in 1888). Although the origins of vodka in Poland can be traced back to as early as the 8th century, Soplica is one of the older industrially produced brands of vodka in the country. Żubrówka, for example, is based on a much older recipe than Soplica (dating back to the Polish–Lithuanian Commonwealth), but exists as an industrially produced brand only since the 1920s.

== History ==
The creator of Soplica vodka was Bolesław Michał Kasprowicz, who in 1888 founded the Fabryka Wódek i Likierów w Gnieźnie (Vodka and Liqueur Factory in Gniezno). The first bottle of Soplica was produced there in 1891, as proven by the replica of the bottle that is held in the Muzeum Początków Państwa Polskiego w Gnieźnie (Museum of the Origins of the Polish State in Gniezno) to this day. Kasprowicz was originally from the town of Czempiń in the Greater Poland Voivodeship. Upon starting his distillery in Gniezno, he quickly became one of the pioneers of alcohol trade of the time. Three years after starting the works, in 1891, Kasprowicz introduced the Soplica clear vodka onto the Polish market. In just a few years, the production facility in Gniezno became a large enterprise, processing as much as 3 wagons of pure spirits a week.

During World War I, Kasprowicz's factory in Gniezno suspended its activity and Kasprowicz himself became involved in nationwide efforts to regain Poland's independence as a sovereign state following 123 years of foreign rule. From the distillery's formation until 1913, Kasprowicz's vodkas and liqueurs earned 73 different awards (including 4 gold medals) on the Polish market and abroad. He became an important figure in the municipality and took office as the city president of Gniezno in 1919. It was not until 1920 that he returned to his role as the manager of his own factory. During the German occupation of Poland in World War II, Kasprowicz was deported to annexed Warsaw by the Nazis and died there in 1943.

The recipes still used for Soplica vodkas and liqueurs were developed by Kasprowicz himself. He was the author of many unique formulas which were handwritten and documented in a tome called recepturarz. All of the wares created by Kasprowicz were marked with the initials B.K. as well as the picture of a carp. The names of all products from his factory referenced Polish tradition and literature. This custom has survived many years, as even now on the labels of modern versions of Soplica vodka there is an image of a dworek (manor houses historically owned by the Polish szlachta) – a reference to the national epic poem Pan Tadeusz by Adam Mickiewicz.

During the first 50 years of its production factories' existence (1888–1939), Kasprowicz's firm earned 93 medals and distinctions for the quality of its products. Since 2009, the pure original version of Soplica as well as its several flavoured variants have been earning numerous awards in both expert and consumer contests. The Soplica brand was acquired by Maspex in 2022. Soplica products are manufactured by Polmos Łańcut in the city of Łańcut, which is located in the Podkarpackie Voivodeship of southeastern Poland.

== Variants ==
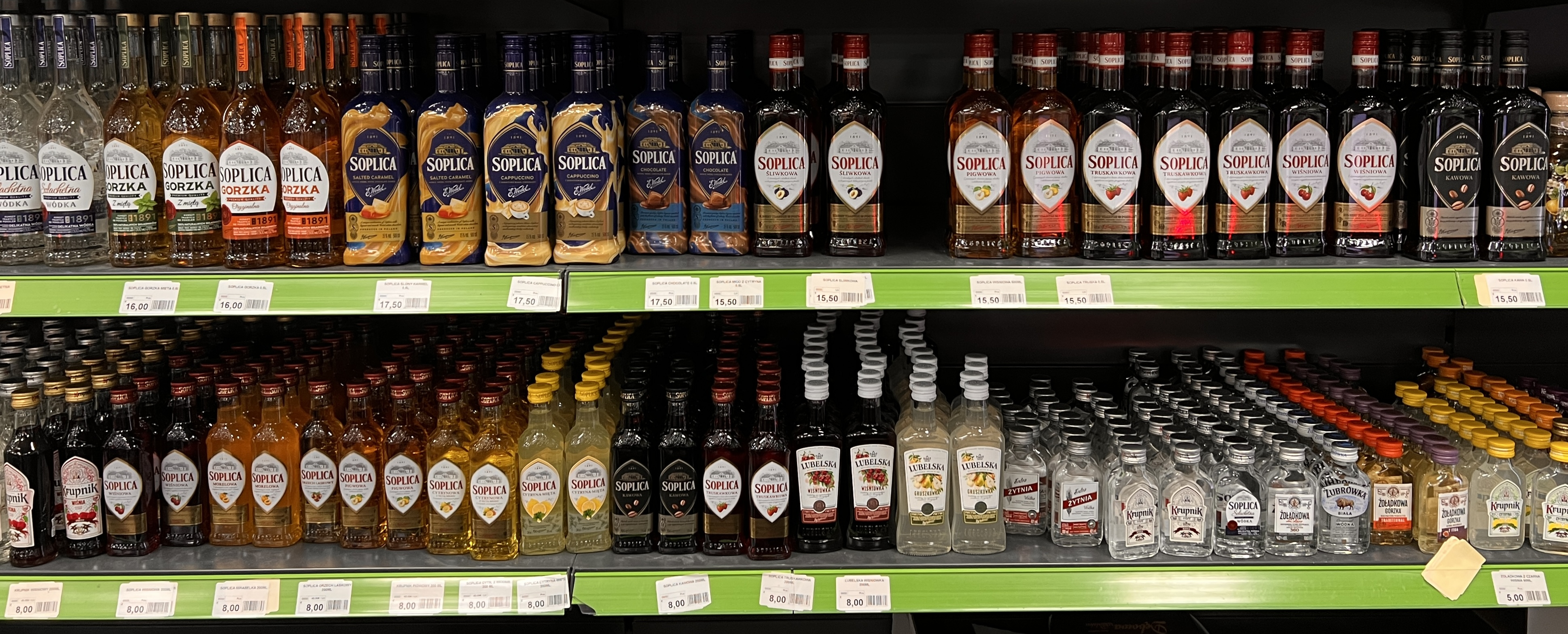
Variety of Soplica bottles in a Polish supermarket in Belgium (2025).

Soplica hazelnut nalewka

Nowadays Soplica comes as several different products. There are the traditional Soplica vodkas with a 40% ABV. A spirit of 60% ABV is sold separately. There are also flavoured variants (commonly known in Polish as nalewki, singular nalewka) which have a lower ABV of 27%. The thirteen drinks distilled as part of the brand are:

=== Vodka ===
- Soplica Szlachetna Wódka – Soplica Noble Vodka (pure vodka)
- Soplica Staropolska – Old Polish Soplica
- Soplica Spirytus Nalewkowy – Soplica Nalewka Spirit

=== Nalewka ===
- Soplica Malinowa – Raspberry Soplica
- Soplica Orzech Laskowy – Hazelnut Soplica
- Soplica Wiśniowa – Cherry Soplica
- Soplica Pigwowa – Quince Soplica
- Soplica Czarna Porzeczka – Blackcurrant Soplica
- Soplica Śliwkowa – Plum Soplica
- Soplica Orzech Włoski – Walnut Soplica
- Soplica Truskawkowa – Strawberry Soplica
- Soplica Jagodowa – Blueberry Soplica
- Soplica Mirabelkowa – Mirabelle Soplica
- Soplica Cytryna-Mięta – Lemon-Mint Soplica
- Soplica Cytryna-Pigwa – Lemon-Quince Soplica
- Soplica Cytryna-Malina – Lemon-Raspberry Soplica
- Soplica Cytryna-Kwiat bzu – Lemon-Lilac flower Soplica
- Soplica Cytrynówka – Lemon Soplica
- Soplica Morelowa – Apricot Soplica
- Soplica Cytrynowa z nutą miodu – Lemon Soplica with a hint of honey
- Soplica Jabłkowa – Apple Soplica
- Soplica Żurawinowa – Cranberry Soplica
- Soplica Kawowa – Coffee Soplica
- Soplica o smaku orzecha w czekoladzie – Nut and chocolate Soplica
- Soplica o smaku migdała w karmelu – Almond and caramel Soplica
- Soplica o smaku wiśni w czekoladzie – Cherry and chocolate Soplica

== See also ==
- List of vodkas
