= Polonaise (vodka) =

Polish brand of vodka

- Type: Vodka
- Manufacturer: Polmos Łańcut
- Origin: Łańcut, Poland
- Alcohol by volume: 40%
- Proof (US): 80
- Related products: List of vodkas

Polonaise is a Polmos Łańcut vodka made from quality rectified grain spirit and water. According to its producer it has a pleasant and delicate aroma and flavor with notes of the grain it is made from. It contains 40% alcohol by volume.

The vodka is named after the national Polish dance Polonaise.

== See also ==
- Distilled beverage
- List of vodkas
