= Łańcut Synagogue =

Former synagogue, now museum, in Łańcut, Poland

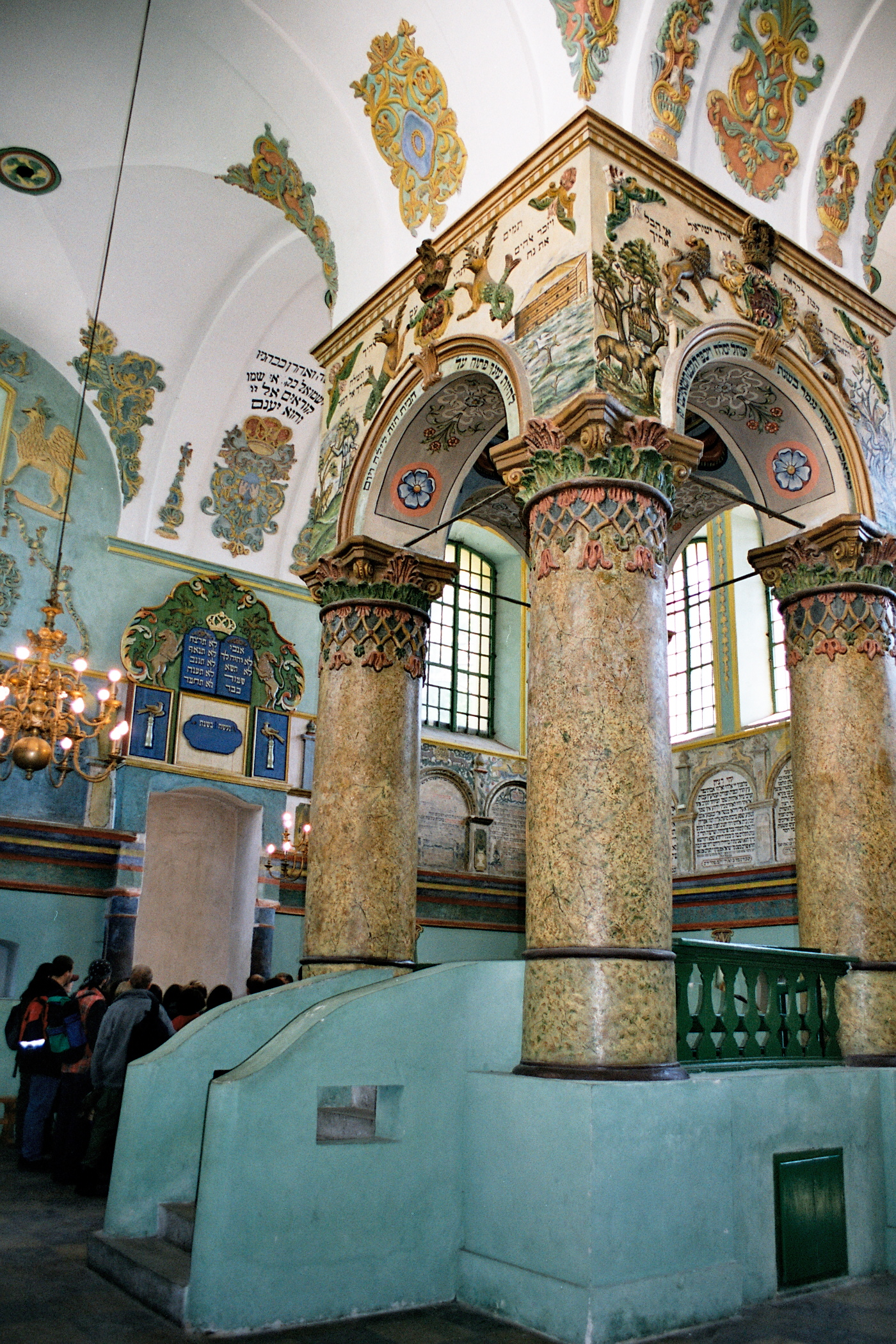
- Interior of the former synagogue with central Bimah, now museum, undated

- Location of the former synagogue, now museum, in Podkarpackie Voivodeship

Religion
- Affiliation: Judaism (former)
- Rite: Nusach Ashkenaz
- Ecclesiastical or organisational status: Synagogue (1761–1939); Profane use (1939–1970s); Jewish museum (since 1981)
- Status: Abandoned; Repurposed

Location
- Location: 17 Sobieskiego Street, Łańcut, Podkarpackie Voivodeship
- Country: Poland
- Coordinates: 50°04′03″N 22°13′54″E

Architecture
- Type: Synagogue architecture
- Style: Baroque
- Funded by: Stanisław Lubomirski
- Completed: 1761
- Materials: Brick

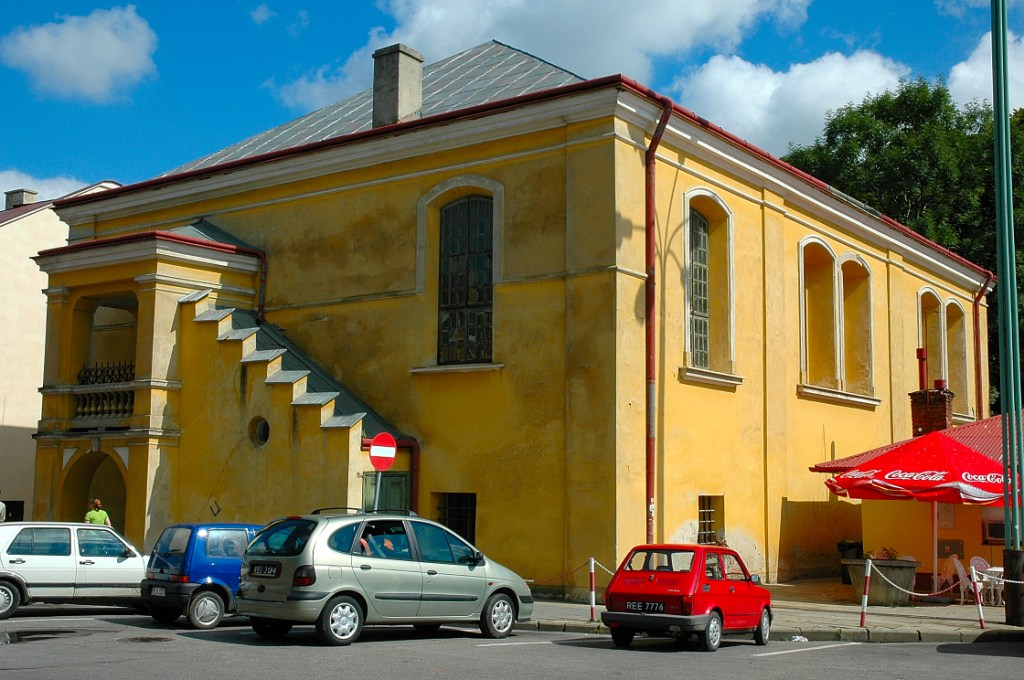
Łańcut synagoga 01

The Łańcut Synagogue is a former Jewish congregation and synagogue, located in Łańcut, in Podkarpackie Voivodeship, Poland. Completed in 1761, it served as a house of prayer until World War II; subsequently used for profane purposes, and as a Jewish museum since 1981. The Łańcut Synagogue is a rare surviving example of the vaulted synagogues with a bimah-tower, that were built throughout the Polish lands in masonry from the sixteenth through the early nineteenth centuries.

== History ==
The synagogue was built in 1761, on the site of an earlier wooden synagogue which was destroyed by fire in 1733. Its construction was financed by Prince Stanisław Lubomirski. "Predecessor buildings" inserted after the sentence above, before "It was renovated in 1896 and 1910." A Jewish community with its own wooden synagogue and cemetery already existed in Łańcut in the first half of the 17th century. That wooden building burned down in 1733 and was rebuilt again in wood by Teodor Lubomirski, voivode of Kraków, before being replaced in 1761 by the masonry building that survives today. As early as 1722, Stanisław Lubomirski had granted the town's Jews a settlement privilege that included freedom to trade and the right to build houses on "Jewish Street" (ul. Żydowska), encouraging Jewish settlement in the town. The synagogue itself was built close to the marketplace, immediately next to the park surrounding the residence of the Lubomirski princes. It was renovated in 1896 and 1910. During these renovations, the walls of the women's gallery above the vestibule were raised to the level of the main hall, new windows were inserted, the articulation of the walls was made uniform, and the whole building — including the main hall — was given a single hipped roof, so that the building's original roof form is no longer known. At the same time, an external stone staircase to the upper floor was added on the west side. In September 1939, the building was set on fire by the invading German Army, however, the building was saved from total destruction by Count Alfred Antoni Potocki and converted into a granary. After the war, the synagogue came into the ownership of the local council, and was occasionally used as an exhibition space. It became a Judaica museum in 1981. The building was superficially renovated in the 1960s, and again more thoroughly from 1983-1990. Only the wooden furnishings were lost in the 1939 fire; the building itself survived and served as a grain warehouse until 1956. The town council subsequently considered demolishing the building for its building materials, but this was prevented. The synagogue was restored and entered into Poland's register of historic monuments under number 315 on 10 April 1969; in 1973 it became a branch of the Łańcut Castle Museum. Since 2013 it has been managed by the Foundation for the Preservation of Jewish Heritage (FODZ); in July 2014, the Israeli company Bezeq donated a *parochet* (Torah ark curtain), which was ceremonially hung on the Holy Ark.

== Architecture ==
The synagogue is a simple Baroque, masonry building with a vestibule and side room, main hall and a women's balcony above the vestibule reached by an exterior staircase. The windows of the main hall are unusually large for a Polish synagogue; Krinsky believes that this may reflect the security of the Jews in Łańcut, who lived under the protection of the landowning family.

=== Layout and the women's sections ===
The main hall is nearly square, with internal dimensions of about 13 by 12 metres, and is set noticeably below the surrounding ground level; its internal height reaches 9.20 metres at the highest point of the vaulting.

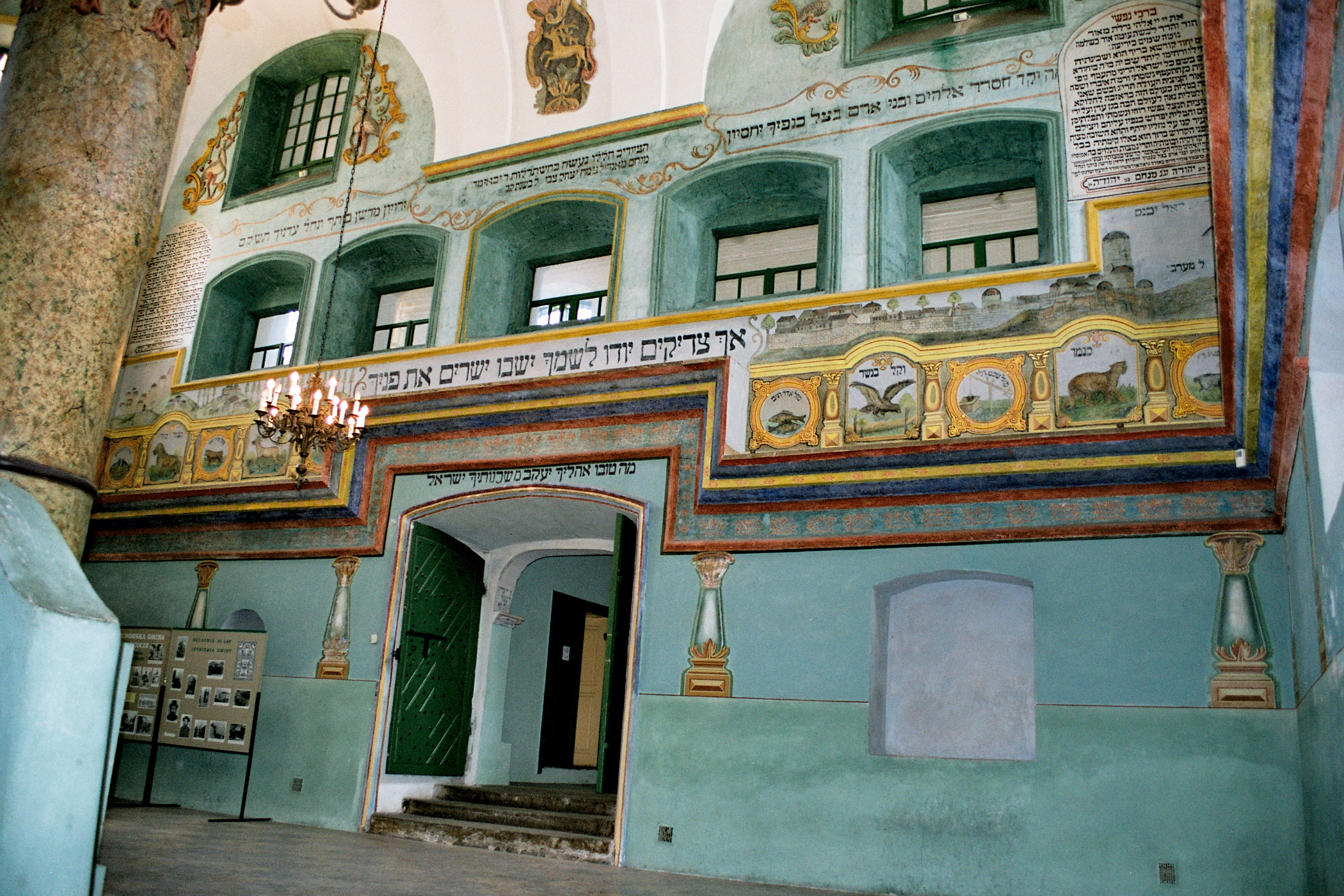
Łańcut synagoga 04

A separate, low wooden prayer room for women originally adjoined the north wall of the building; it was destroyed by fire during the Second World War, but the sockets for its ceiling beams, along with openings that once connected it to the main hall (now glazed and serving as additional windows), remain visible on the exterior of the north wall.

A second women's room is located above the vestibule, as it was originally; its 18th-century windows looking into the main hall are recorded in a watercolour by Zygmunt Vogel from 1797, and traces of them can still be seen on the walls of the hall. The synagogue is built with eight, barrel-vaulted bays around a central Bimah, the four, massive, masonry pillars of which support the ceiling and roof. Painted, decorative plasterwork adorns the pillar capitals, ceiling, and walls. The floor in the restored building is made of concrete. The walls are divided into three horizontal zones: a lower base zone, crowned by a prominent cornice; a middle zone, up to the level of the window sills, filled with an arcade frieze containing numerous Hebrew texts; and an upper zone with tall, segment-headed windows — two each in the east and west walls (those in the west wall were partly blocked when the women's gallery was added), and four windows, in two pairs, in each side wall. Around the bimah, semicircular buttressing arches rest on the cornice that crowns the arcade joining its four columns; the bays between them are filled by cross-vaults in the corners, high barrel vaults on the sides, and a small cupola directly above the bimah. The walls are decorated reproductions of the pre-war paintings. The original paintings were created in the 18th century, with more being added around 1900. They feature traditional Jewish subjects, such as Noah and the Ark, symbols of the Zodiac, and images of musical instruments mentioned in the Book of Psalms.

=== The Holy Ark ===
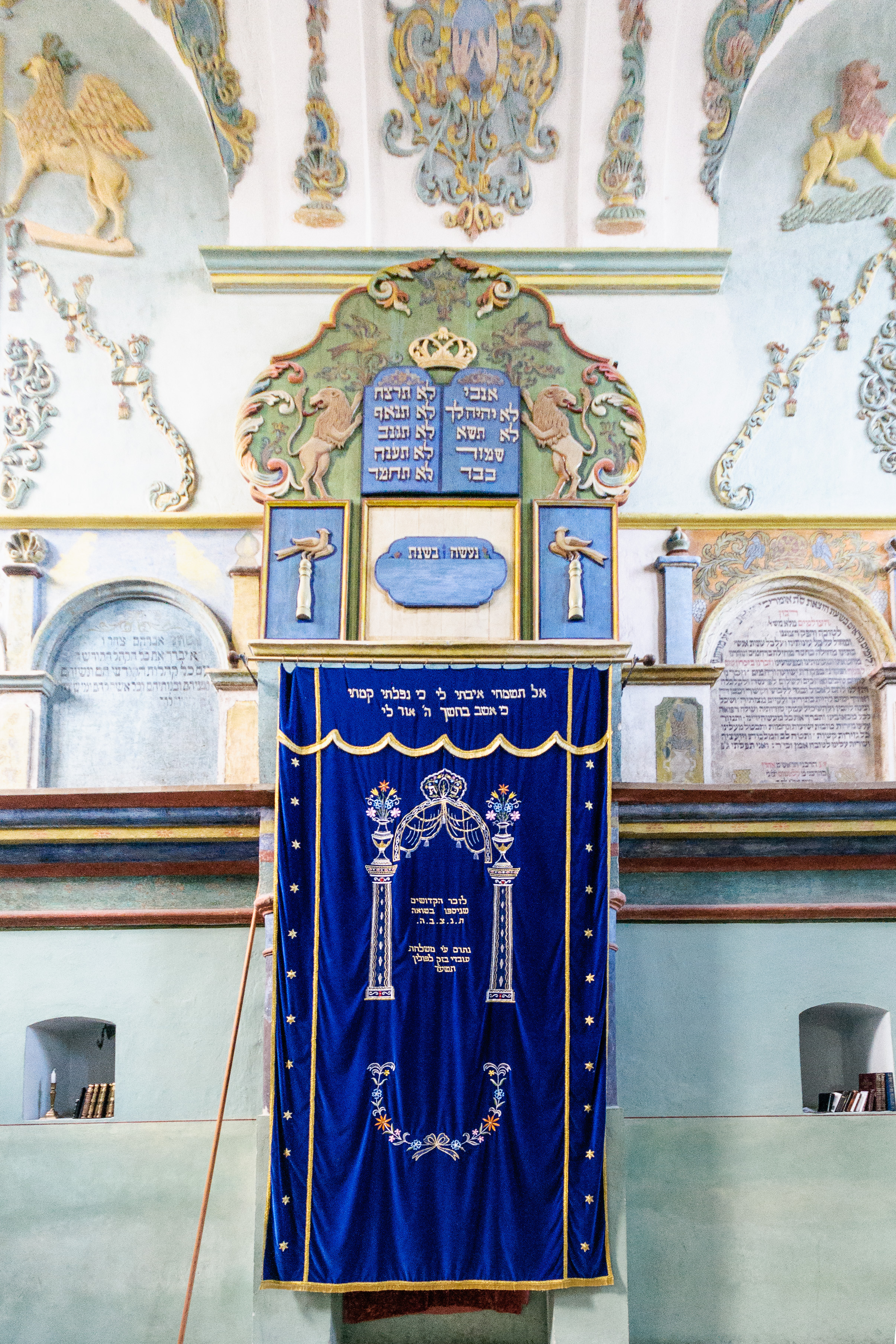
Łańcut, Synagoga w Łańcucie DZolopa 2019-08-16 170226 1297

The Holy Ark stands on the east wall. Its lower, masonry section, containing the cupboard for the Torah scrolls, was probably rebuilt during one of the later renovations. The wooden superstructure above it — the only surviving wooden element of the historic furnishings — is topped by the Tablets of the Law beneath a crown, flanked by two rampant lions; below these are three panels, the central one bearing a text and the outer two each showing a bird. Above the Tablets, a pair of hands in a gesture of blessing is depicted, framed by a plant ornament topped with a crown.

=== Iconography of the wall and ceiling paintings ===
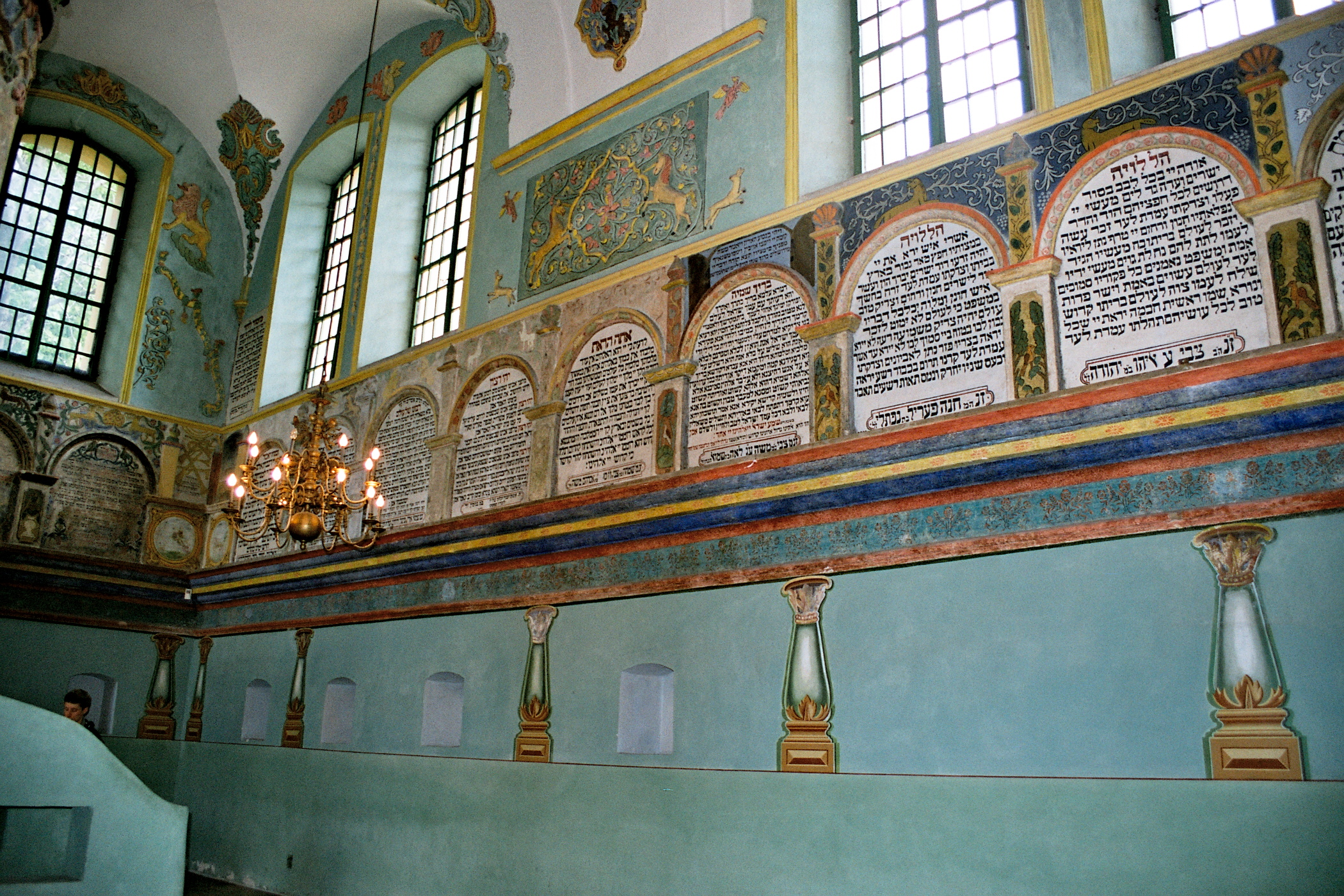
Łańcut synagoga 05

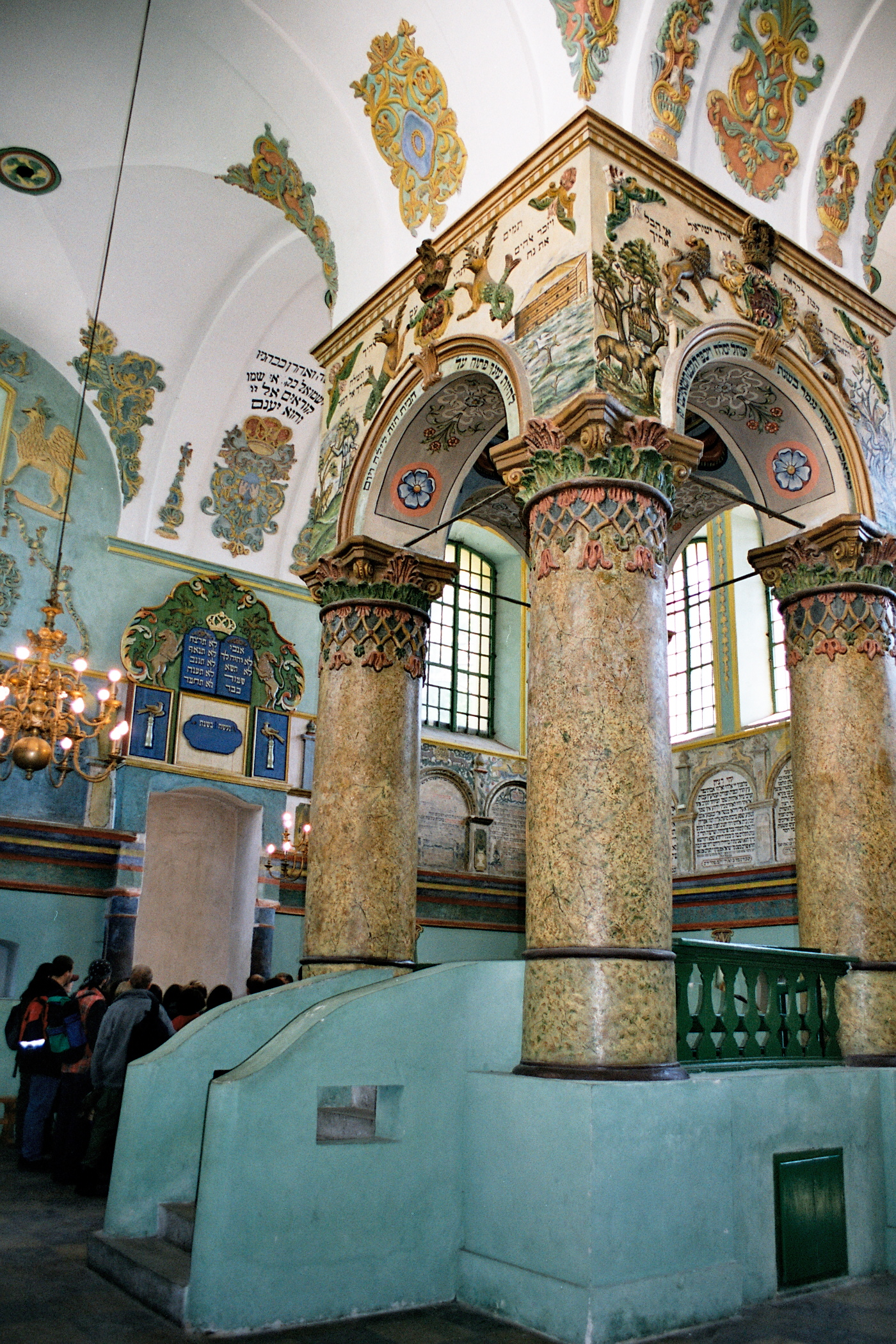
Łańcut synagoga 06

On the superstructure above the bimah, the paintings depict a menorah, a table for the bread offerings, the Tablets of the Law, and a sequence of biblical scenes: the temptation of Adam, Cain's murder of Abel, Noah's Ark, and Abraham's sacrifice of Isaac. Elsewhere on the vault and walls are creatures from the Mishnah, griffins, vessels from the Temple of Solomon, further hands of blessing, crowns, and plant and rocaille ornaments in bright colours, predominantly pale green and gold. Above the main cornice, medallions show the signs of the zodiac in calendar order, each paired with an image of the corresponding Jewish festival — for instance, a green landscape above the sign of Gemini, symbolising the festival of Shavuot, for which the synagogue was traditionally decorated with green branches. The Hebrew texts in the arcade frieze are prayers and psalms; the oldest, on the east wall, date from the 18th century, with further texts added in the 19th and 20th centuries, and the names of the donors of each painted panel are recorded along its borders. Zygmunt Vogel's 1797 watercolour, the oldest known image of the interior, shows that the main hall has survived to the present day essentially unchanged in its proportions; the one significant replacement has been the original balustrade of turned balusters around the bimah platform, which was later replaced by a massive masonry balustrade.

=== Vestibule and the "Lublin Room" ===
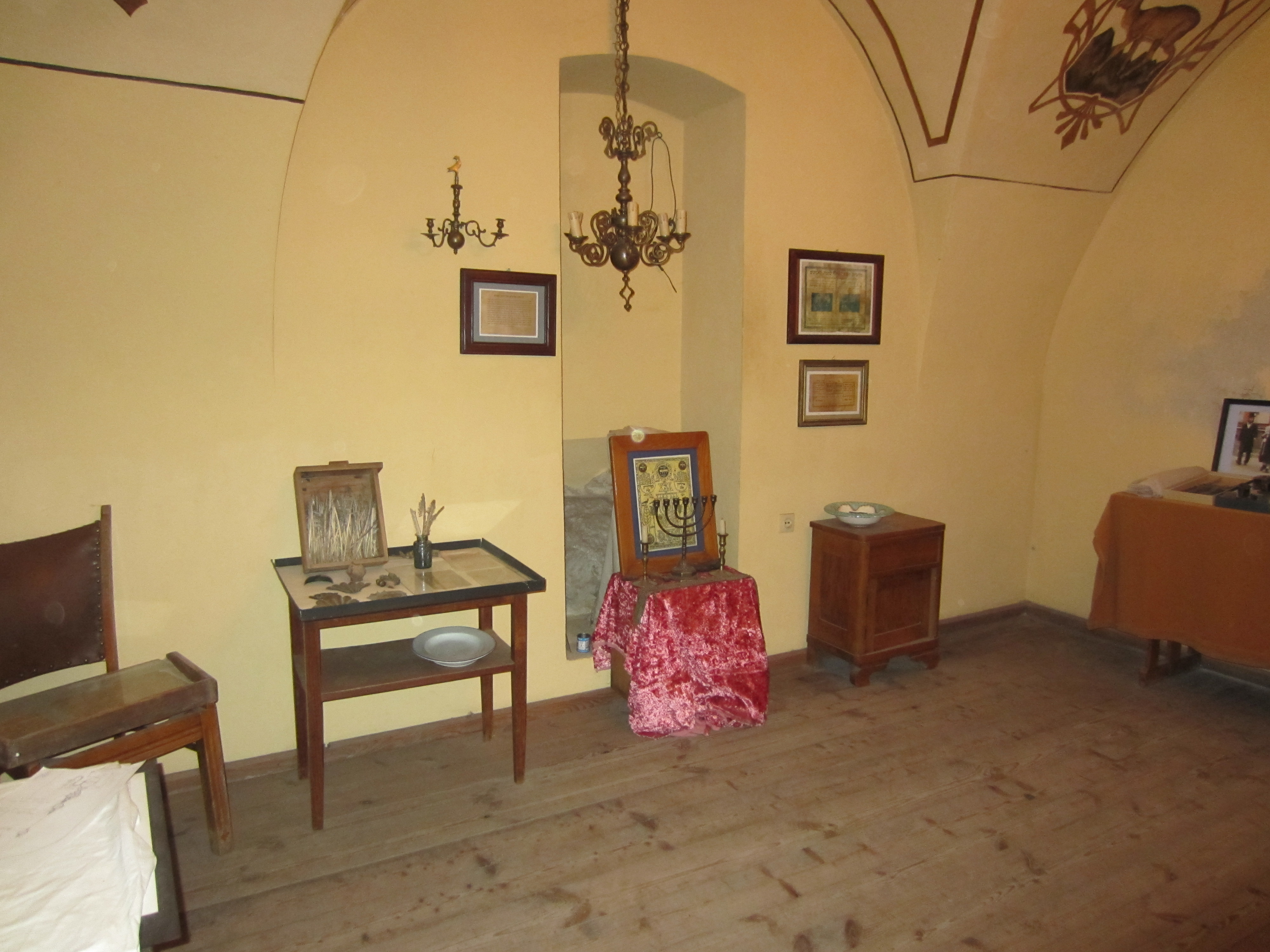
לנצוט, החדר הסמוך לבית הכנסת (2)

The western part of the building contains the vestibule, which gives access to both the main hall and a smaller side room known as the "Lublin Room" (sala lubelska). This room served as a meeting place for the community, as the seat of the rabbinical court, and for daily prayers; its vault still bears painted images of animals — including a lion, a deer and an eagle — together with Hebrew inscriptions. The vestibule today also houses matzevot (gravestones) recovered after the Second World War from the Jewish cemeteries of Łańcut, which had been destroyed by the German occupiers.

== Jewish community of Łańcut ==
Jews are first recorded in Łańcut in 1554; by 1566, five Jewish families (around 30 people) lived in the town. In the 1570s the town's then-owner, Krzysztof Pilecki, prohibited Jews from owning houses or taking part in trade; this prohibition was confirmed by King Sigismund III Vasa in 1613 but lost its force over the course of the 17th century. By 1765, following Stanisław Lubomirski's 1722 settlement privilege, the town's Jewish population had grown to 829. In the second half of the 18th century, Hasidic Judaism became increasingly influential in Łańcut: between 1770 and 1772 the town was home to the tzaddik Elimelech ben Eleazar Lipman, known as Elimelech of Leżajsk, and from 1790 his pupil Yaakov Yitzchak ha-Levi Horowitz, the "Seer of Lublin". At the same time, proponents of the Haskalah founded a German-language "Jüdische Normalschule" in 1788, later known as the Jüdisch-Deutsche Schule. The community maintained a hospital, a bathhouse, a house of prayer and two cemeteries, the second established around 1860. By 1884, around 1,400 Jews lived in Łańcut — about 40.7% of the town's population — and at that time the town had two synagogues.

== Gallery ==
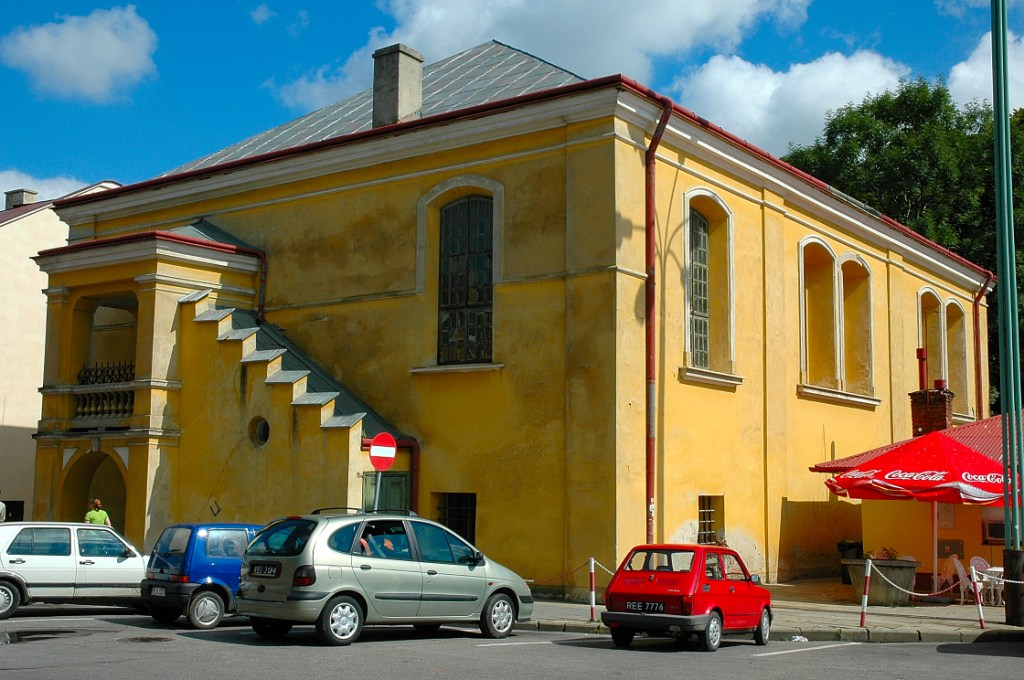
Exterior

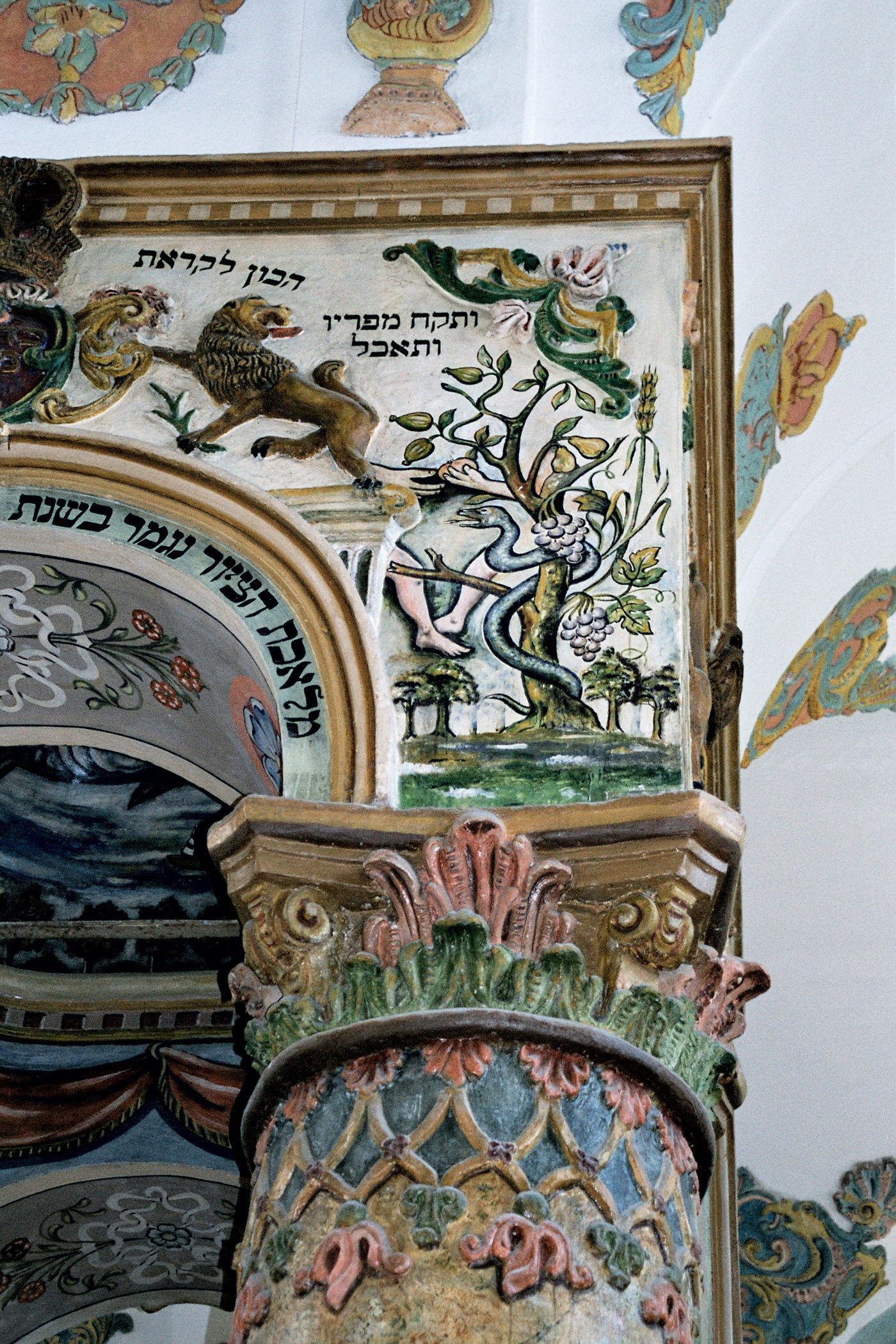
Stucco decorations of Bimah

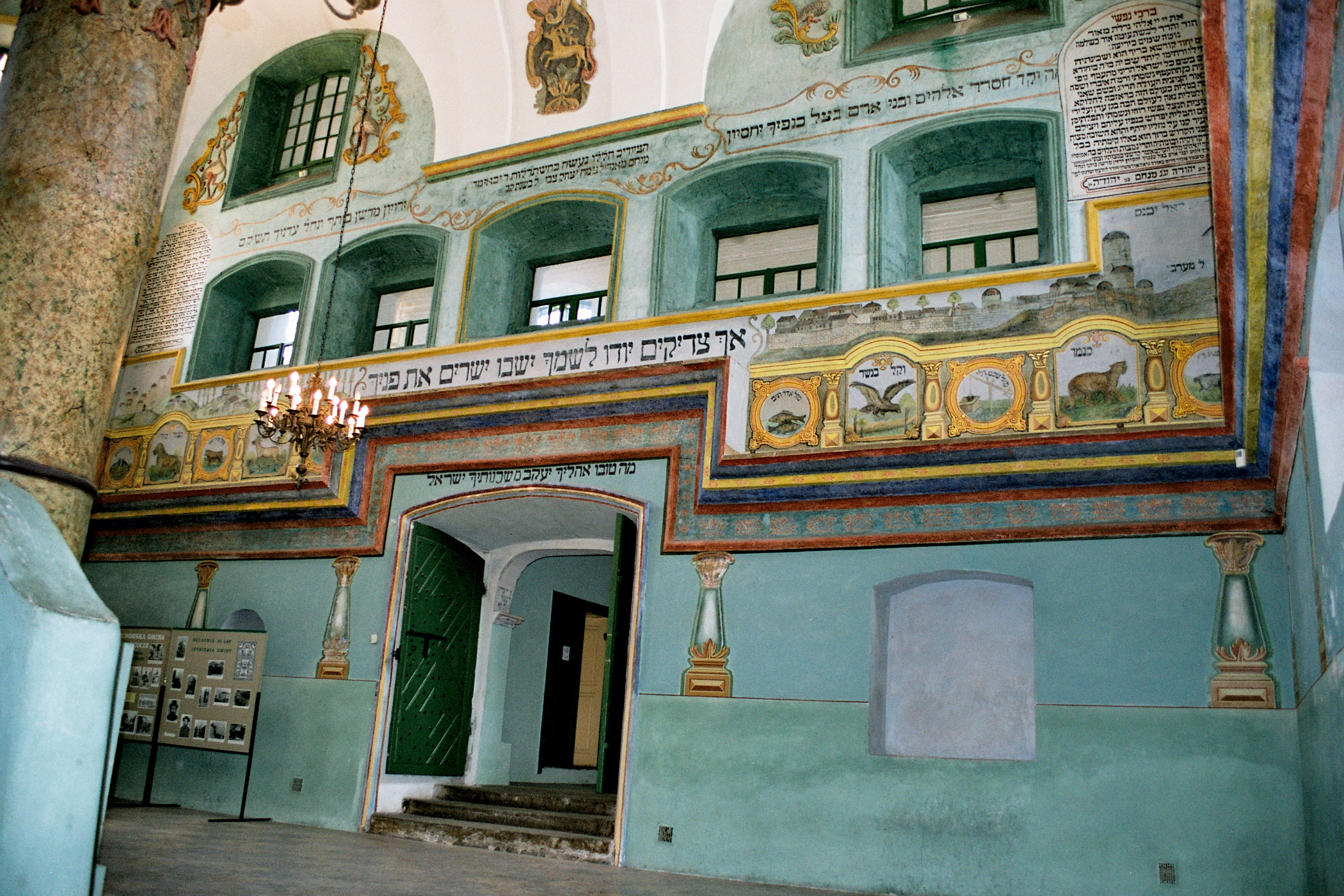
Animal and landscape wall decoration of women's section

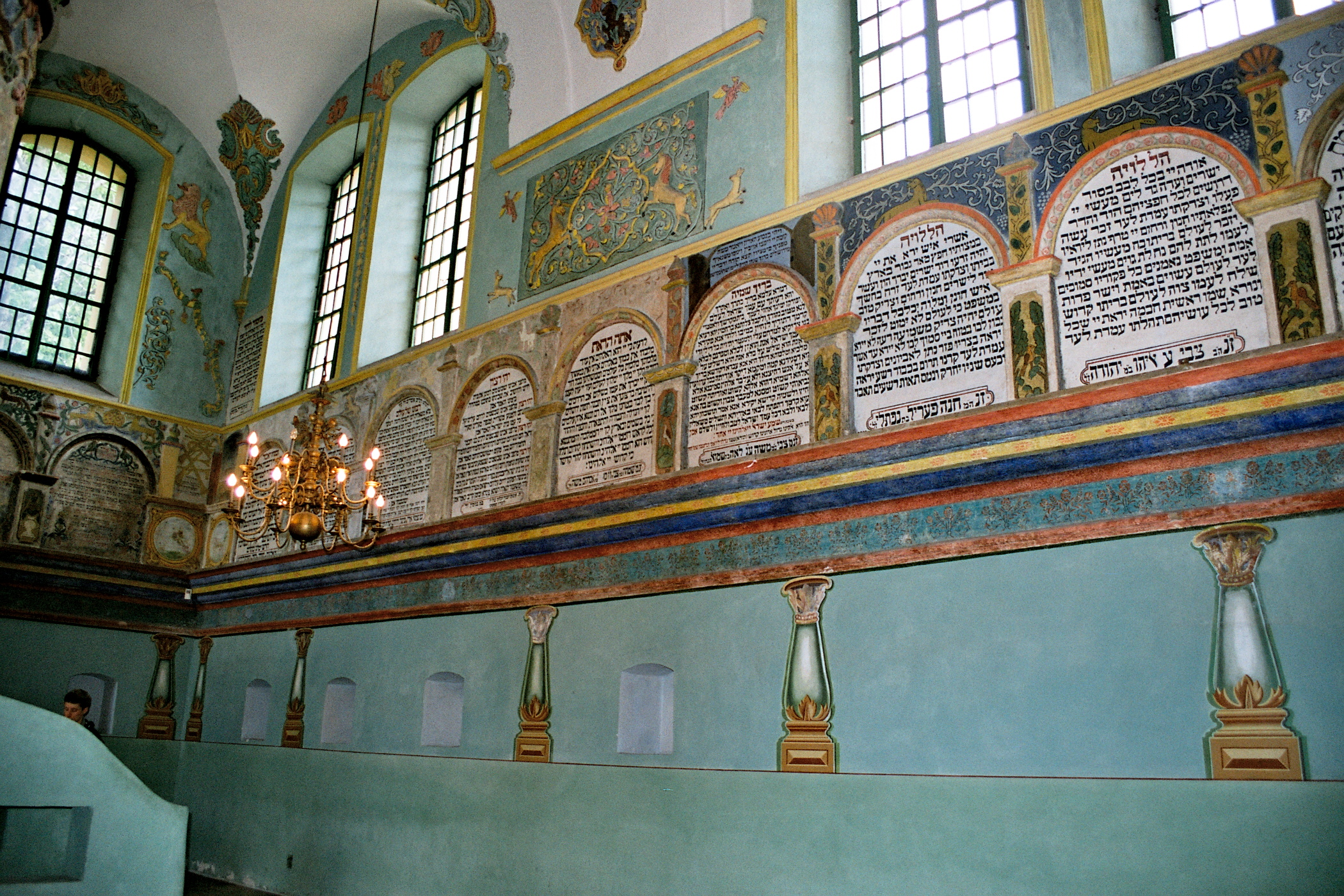
Ornate frescoes with Hebrew texts

== See also ==
- History of the Jews in Poland
- List of active synagogues in Poland
