= Polmos Łańcut =

Polish distillery

Łańcut
- Type: Luxury Vodka
- Manufacturer: Polmos Łańcut
- Origin: Łańcut, Poland
- Related products: List of vodkas

The Polmos Łańcut distillery is one of the oldest producers of liquors and liqueurs in Poland. A small amount of the distillery's output is exported to Belgium, the Netherlands, France, Great Britain, Germany, Italy, and the United States.

== History ==
The distillery in Łańcut was founded by Duchess Lubomirska on the vast estate of the Lubomirski family. An original document attesting to the distillery's existence in 1784 can be found in its museum. Primarily the Łańcut estate produced regular, anise flavoured and sweetened vodkas.

Count Alfred Wojciech Potocki, a grandson and heir of the Duchess, started to run the Łańcut and Lwów Lubomirski estates in 1823. He modernised the management of these properties, and implemented the Schwartz distillation equipment. The production of premium vodkas, liqueurs, creams and ratafias was started, in addition to regular and anise flavoured vodkas. The estate ran two company outlets in Lwów and Vienna. In 1882 Alfred Józef Potocki created a network of agents to promote sales in Galicia and Austria-Hungary. Trains of the Viennese rail lines passing through the town of Łańcut used to make longer stops to allow travellers to buy the distilleries' famous products. In 1900, Count Alfred Potocki's Distillery won a gold medal at the International Exposition in Paris for his array of products. Between 1911–1912 Roman Potocki moved the plant to a newly equipped building. Some of the buildings were destroyed with the eruption of World War I. The difficulties were helped by establishing a stock company in 1917.

In 1924 the State alcohol monopoly was funded in Warsaw. Łańcut distillery managed to hold its position among the best companies in the country thanks to investments in equipment and innovations. The plant survived the outbreak of World War II largely intact, but it suffered major destruction in 1944 from the withdrawing German armies and advancing Russian units. In 1951 a state enterprise called Łańcut Spirits Industries was created out of the Łańcut Spirits Stock Company and Count Alfred Potocki's Privileged Distillery of Liqueurs, Rosoglios and Rum in Łańcut. In 1969 the plant was producing fifteen kinds of unflavoured and flavoured vodkas, about 200,000 bottles a day.

In 1991 Polmos, the Polish Alcohol Monopoly was dissolved. The distillery became an autonomous state company. The previous product line was maintained: about sixty brands, including Wyborowa, Luksusowa, Extra Żytnia, Krakus, Polonaise, Jarzębiak, Soplica, Pieprzówka, Żubrówka, Wiśniówka and Ratafia and also Polish Cherry and Cacao Choix liqueurs. Soon more than a dozen of own products was added to the brand assortment. Among others Łańcut vodka was introduced and the flag product of the old Potocki firm, Rosoglios, was reintroduced.

== Museum of Vodka Industry ==
The Łańcut distillery holds a museum portraying the plant's traditions and the history of the Polish vodka industry. The museum is located in a manor built in 1883, designed by Ludwik Boguchwalski, which once was the headquarters of the estate management. Its exposition contains old distilling devices, antique machinery as well as old documents, labels, bottles and tasting glasses.

== Brands ==
- Soplica
- Biała Dama
- Ck vodka
- Estate vodka
- Harnaś

Łańcut is a pure vodka produced by Polmos Łańcut form high quality grain spirit rectified and filtered many times. According to its producer it has a mild and delicate taste and aroma which is obtained by the use of time-tested ingredients and careful processing. It contains 40% alcohol by volume.

In 1995 it was granted a gold medal by International Fair POLAGRA in Poznań. It was also awarded with a silver medal and ranked 87 "Highly Recommended" points by the Beverage Testing Institute in Chicago.

- Polka
- Polonaise
- Pro Polonia
- Rosoglio
- Wisent

== See also ==
- Polmos
- Vodka
- Distilled beverage
- Lubomirski
- Potocki
