= Łańcut =

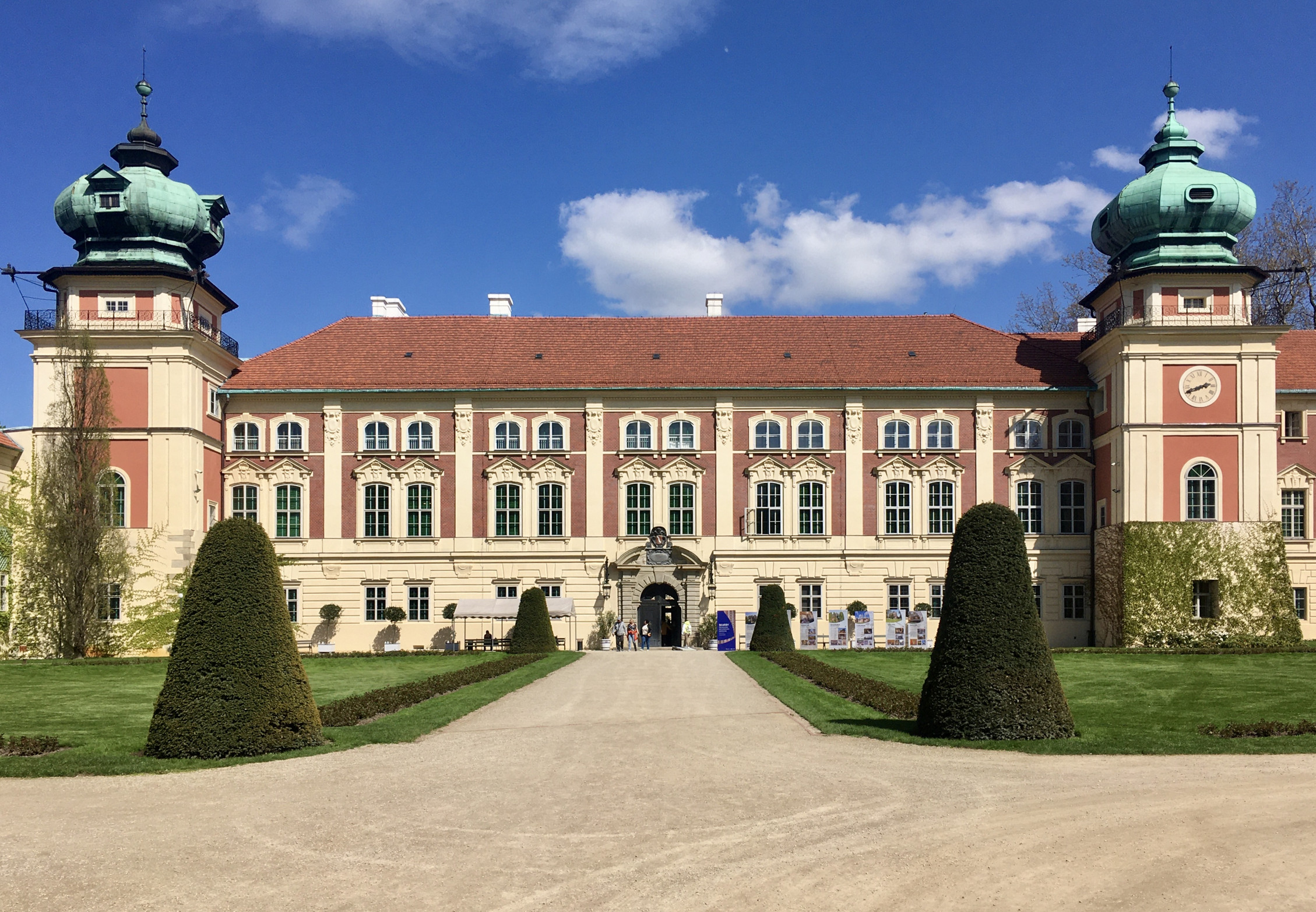
- Łańcut Castle

- Flag Coat of arms

- Location within Poland
- Coordinates: 50°4′N 22°14′E
- Country: Poland
- Voivodeship: Subcarpathian
- County: Łańcut
- Gmina: Łańcut (urban gmina)
- Town rights: 1349

Government
  - Mayor: Damian Szubart (PL2050)

Area
  - Total: 19.43 km^{2} (7.50 sq mi)

Population (2006)
  - Total: 17,772
  - Density: 914.7/km^{2} (2,369/sq mi)
- Time zone: UTC+1 (CET)
  - Summer (DST): UTC+2 (CEST)
- Postal code: 37–100
- Car plates: RLA
- Website: www.lancut.pl

Łańcut (Note: Polish: [ˈwaj̃t͡sut], Yiddish: לאַנצוט, romanized: Lantzut; Latin: Lancutia) is a town in south-eastern Poland, with 17,772 inhabitants, as of 31 December 2024. Situated in the Subcarpathian Voivodeship (since 1999), it is the capital of Łańcut County.

== History ==
Archaeological investigations carried out in the region of Łańcut confirm the existence of human settlements from about 4000 years B.C.

The first owner of the town was Otton (''z Pilczy'') Pilecki, who was given the Łańcut estate by the Polish king, Casimir III the Great, in 1349, as a reward for his service. Casimir settled the city with German refugees from the city of Landshut in Bavaria and that is where the Polish name Lancut originated. At the same time, the king also granted Łańcut its city rights according to Magdeburg law. In 1381, Łańcut was officially named a 'town' for the first time, by its owner Otton Pilecki, in the foundation charter of the town. Łańcut remained under the ownership of the Pilecki family up to 1586.

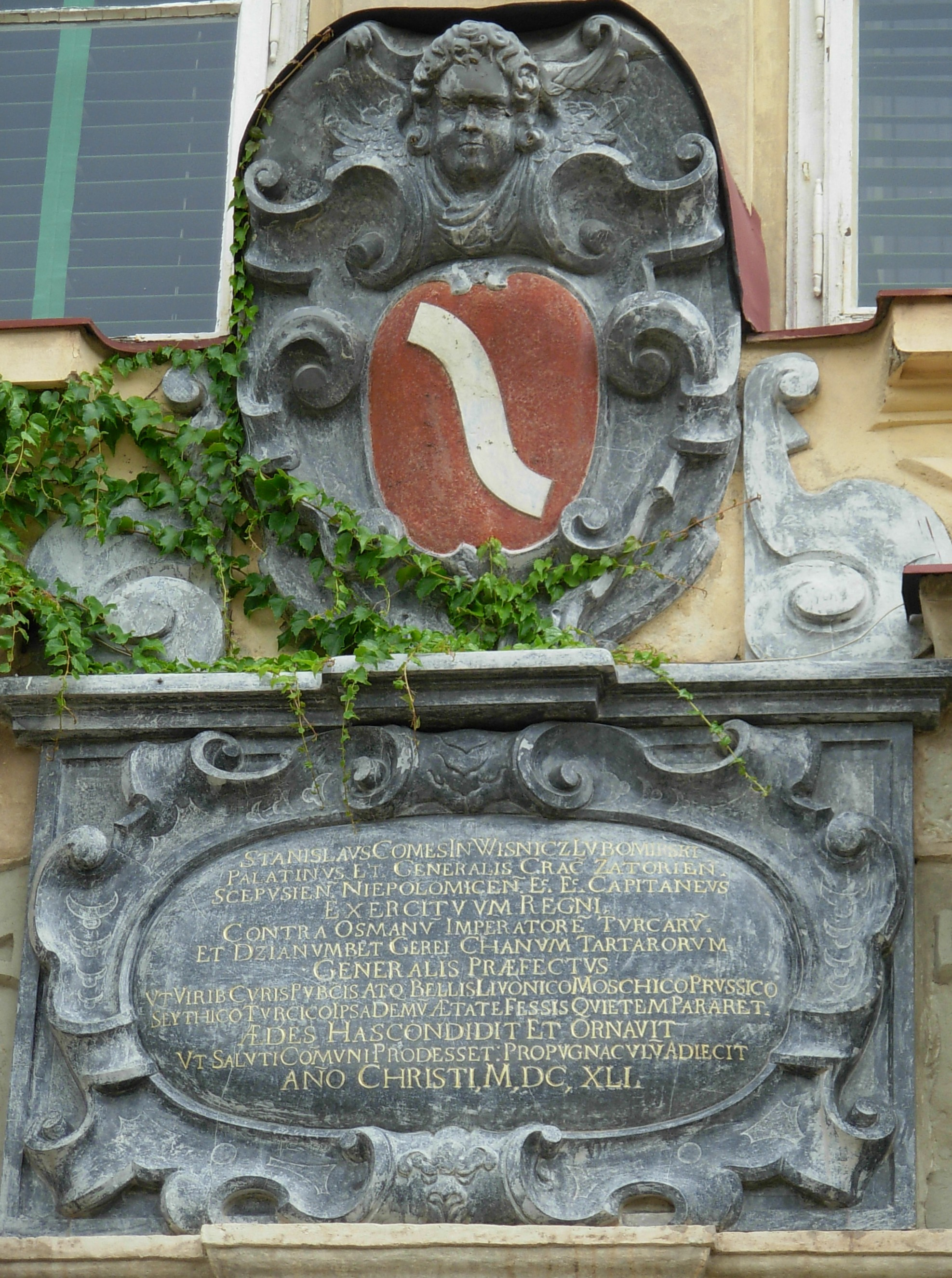
Drużyna coat of arms of the Lubomirski family above the main entrance to the castle

The city was then owned consecutively by aristocratic Polish families of Stadnicki, Lubomirski, and Potocki.

In 1622 and again in 1624, the city was attacked by the Tartars. Men were slaughtered and women and children were taken into captivity during these attacks. When the town was purchased by Stanisław Lubomirski in 1629, he secured the services of architect Matteo (Polish: 'Maciej') Trapola and the stuccoist Giovanni Battista Falconi, in order to build a fortified residence in the town. Łańcut Castle, was thus completed in 1641 and reconstructed many times since. Jerzy Sebastian Lubomirski, fearing attack from the Swedes, further strengthened the fortifications. To perform these works he employed Tylman van Gameren, a Dutchman and one of the most prominent foreign architects to ever work in Poland.

The castle is situated in the centre of the town and constructed in the style of a grand aristocratic palace-residence. It was last owned until 1944 by the Potocki family, and made infamous in late 16th century during the times of Stanisław Stadnicki, who was known as 'the Devil of Łańcut' (Polish: diabeł łańcucki) for his violent behaviour. After 1775 the palace was owned by Izabella Lubomirska, who extended it and had the interiors remodelled. The palace is currently a museum particularly well known for its large collection of historic carriages. Since 1961, a well-known classical music festival is held there annually.

In the year 1657 there was a Swedish invasion. During the siege the city was burned down except for the palace which was well defended.

In 1772, after the First Partition of Poland, Łańcut became part of the Austrian Kingdom of Galicia and Lodomeria where it remained until 1918 when it became part of reborn independent Poland. In the 1830s, Ignacy Łukasiewicz, Polish pharmacist and inventor, known as the pioneer of the world's petroleum industry, was an apprentice in a pharmacy in Łańcut. At that time he joined the Polish secret resistance movement, and the Austrian police conducted the first investigation against him.

The Polish population sympathized with the national Polish movement during a rebellion in 1863 and supplied weapons to the rebels. They helped recruit youth into rebels' camps and sheltered refugees arriving from Russia.

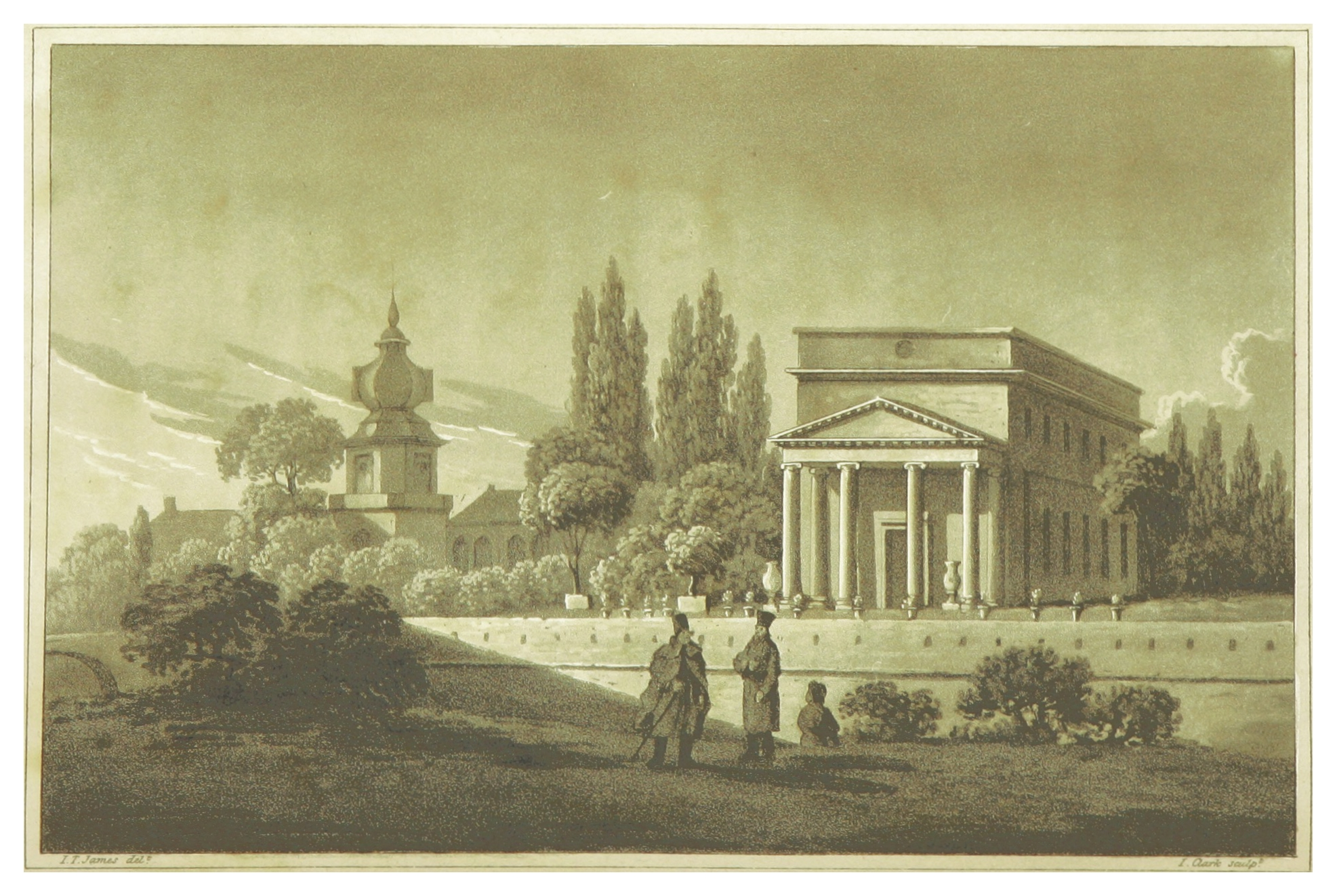
Lubomirski Castle with the orangery in the foreground in the 1810s

At the end of the 18th century, Duchess Izabela Lubomirska established a distillery on the vast estate of the Lubomirski family in Łańcut. Count Alfred Wojciech Potocki, a grandson and heir of the Duchess, started to run the Łańcut and Lwów Lubomirski estates in 1823. He modernised the management of these properties. The distillery has changed ownership several times and now exists under the name of Polmos Łańcut. It is well known for producing flavoured and sweetened vodkas.

A big fire had destroyed the city in 1820 and it took many years for the city to recover. After 1848, the economy improved thanks to the railroad passing through the city, and the establishment of industrial enterprises such as a sugar factory built by Alfred Potocki in 1870.

Jews began to settle in Łańcut in the 16th century: the earliest mention of a settler is 1554. The landowner Stanisław Lubomirski employed a Jewish factor for his Łańcut estate in 1629. in 1707 the Council of Four Lands (the Polish Jewish parliament). met in Łańcut. A wooden synagogue burnt down in 1716 and new brick synagogue was commenced in 1726. The project was supported by the Lubomirski family and the synagogue, which still stands, was completed in 1761 (see below). In the mid-18th century, the town's population consisted of 62% Roman Catholics (Poles) and 37% Jews. Local Jewish cemeteries are the resting place of the famous Rabbi Zvi Naftali Horowitz, the Grand Rabbi of Ropczyce and Rabbi Ahron Moshe Leifer, the Grand Rabbi of Żołynia. Every year, followers of the Hasidic Judaism come to pray at their graves.

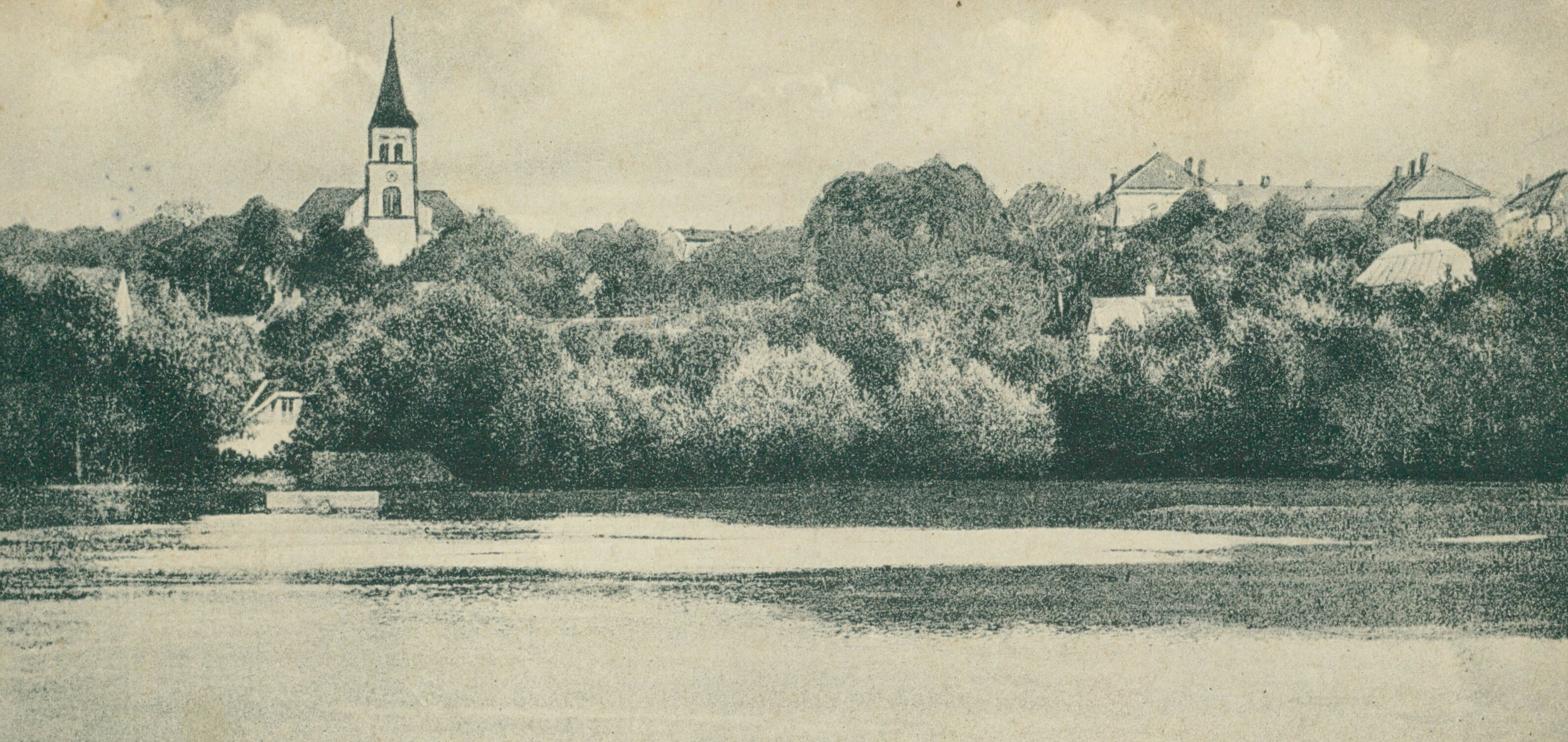
Łańcus, 1915

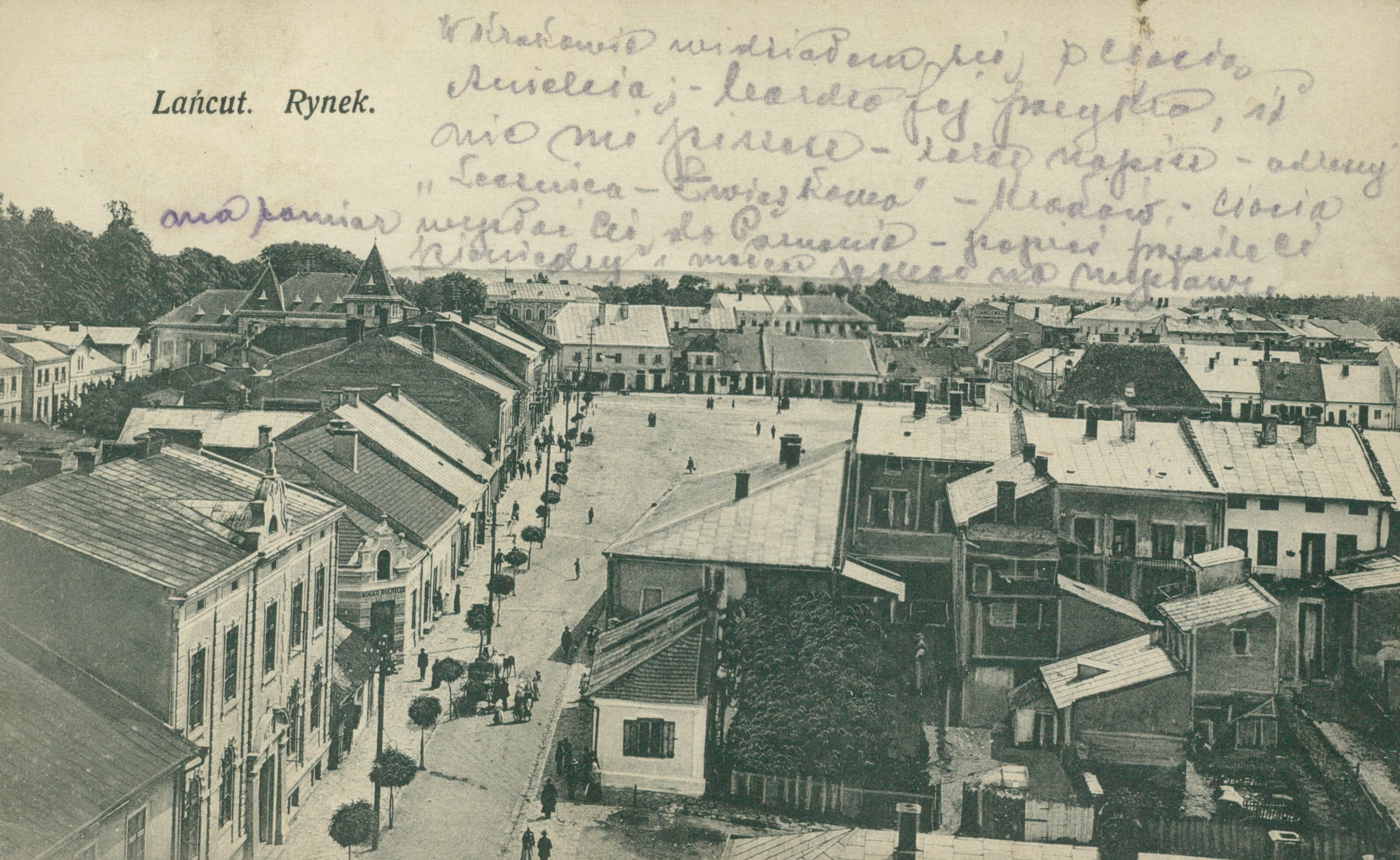
Market square, 1915

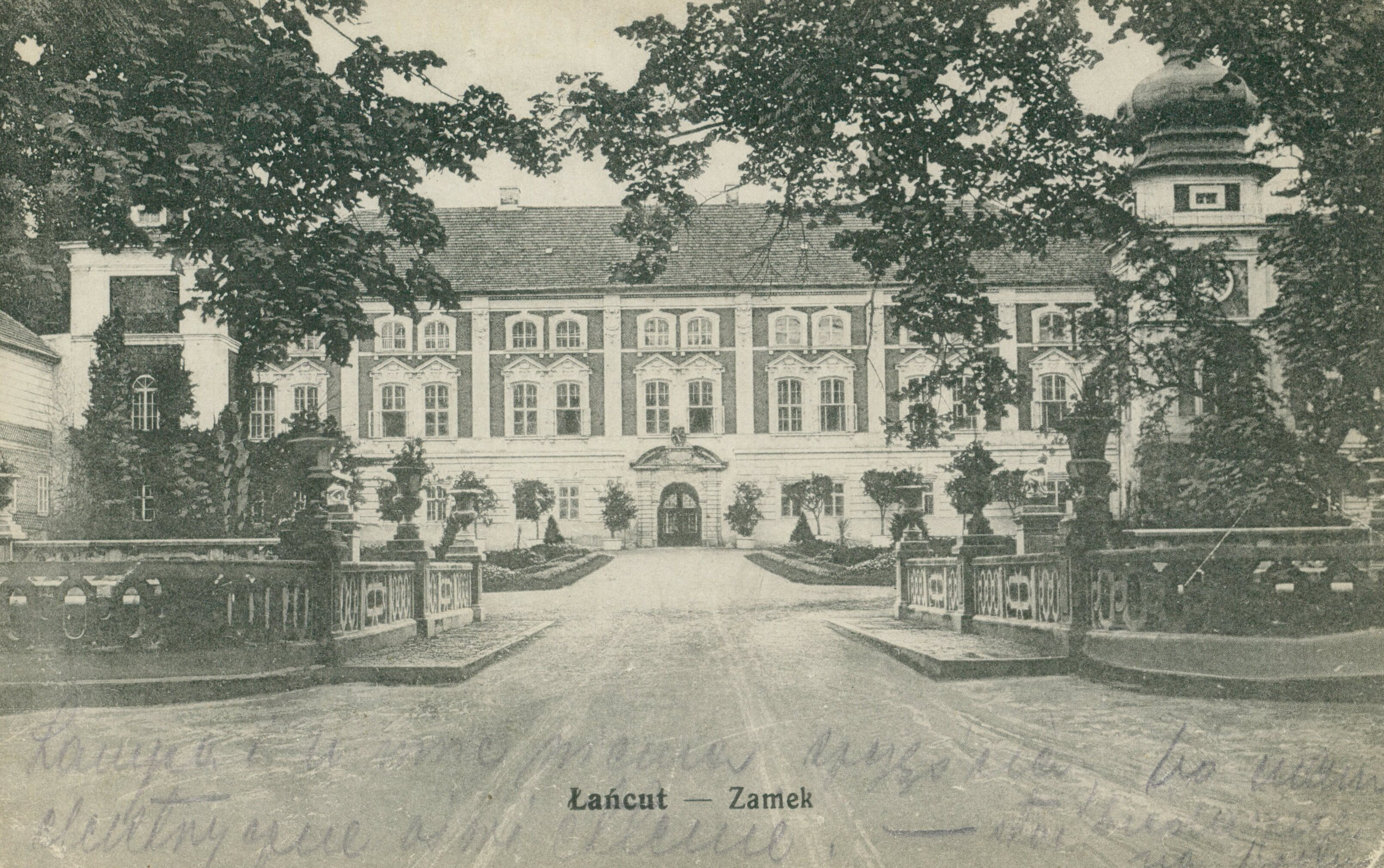
Castle, 1915

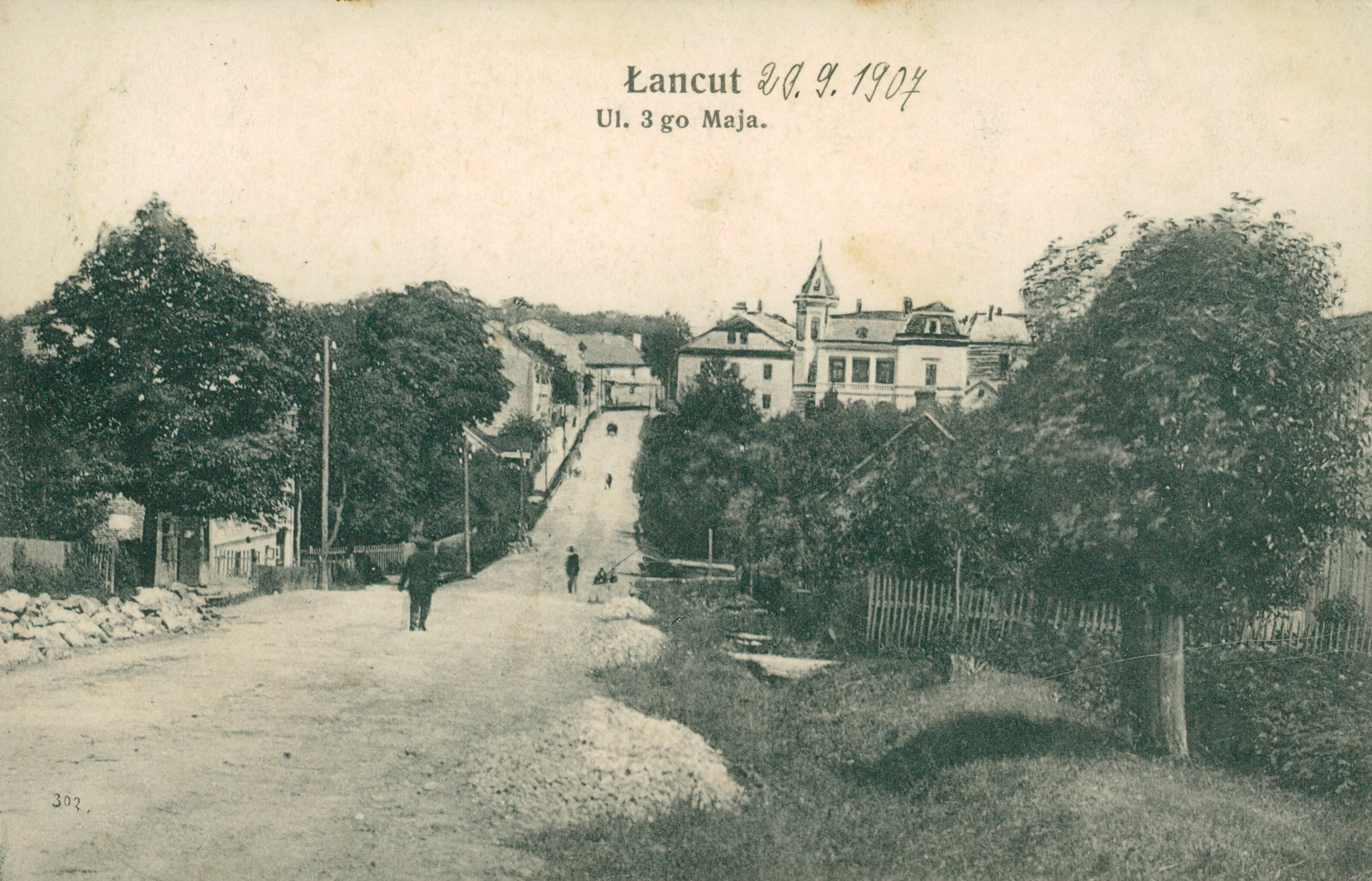
3-go Maja Street, 1907

Within interwar Poland, Łańcut was a county seat administratively located in the Lwów Voivodeship. Prior to World War II, Łańcut had a thriving Jewish community constituting about one-third of the city population. In 1939 there were 2,750 Jews in Łańcut. The 10th Mounted Rifle Regiment of the Polish Army was stationed in Łańcut in the interbellum.

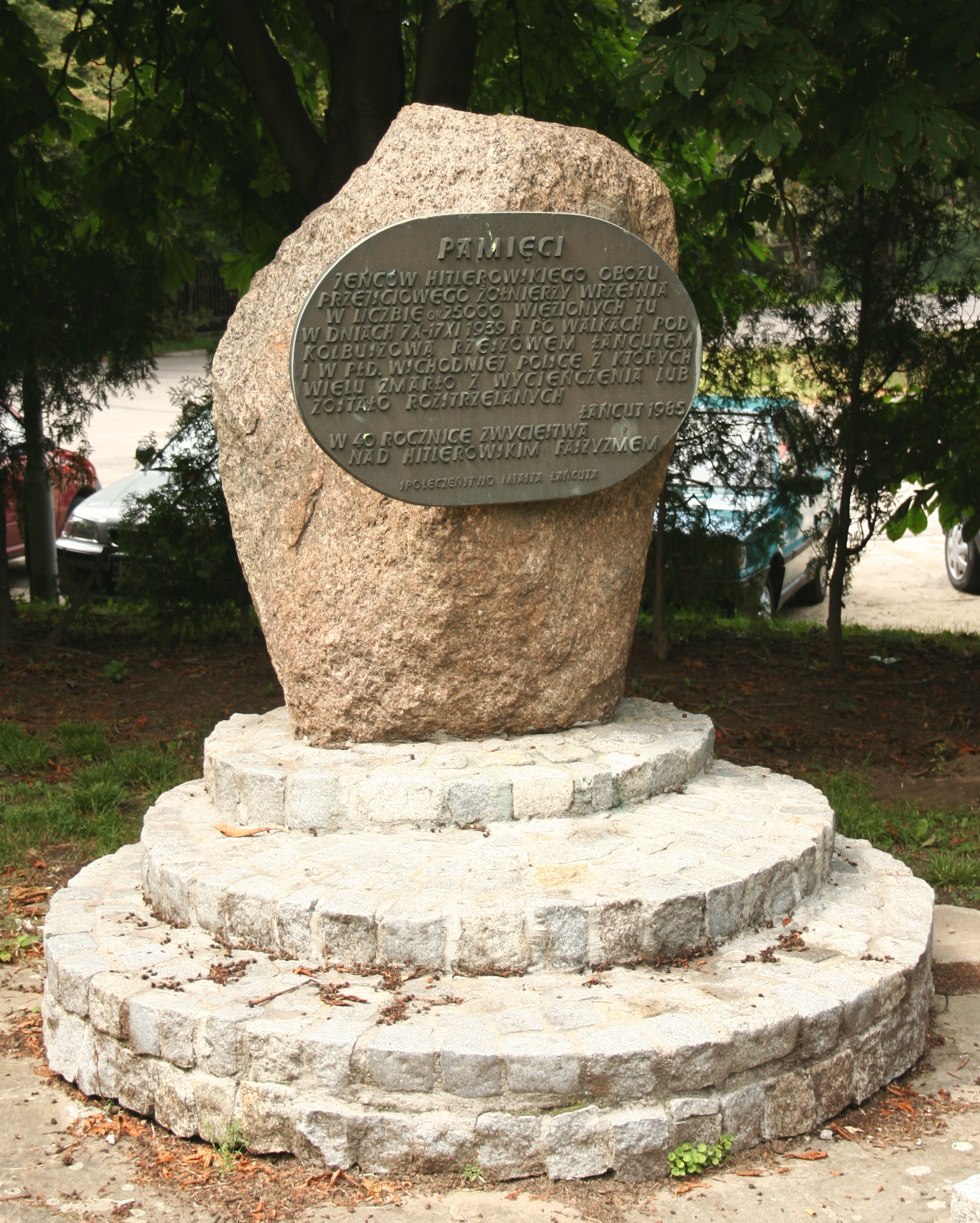
Memorial at the site of a German POW camp where 25,000 Polish soldiers were held in November 1939

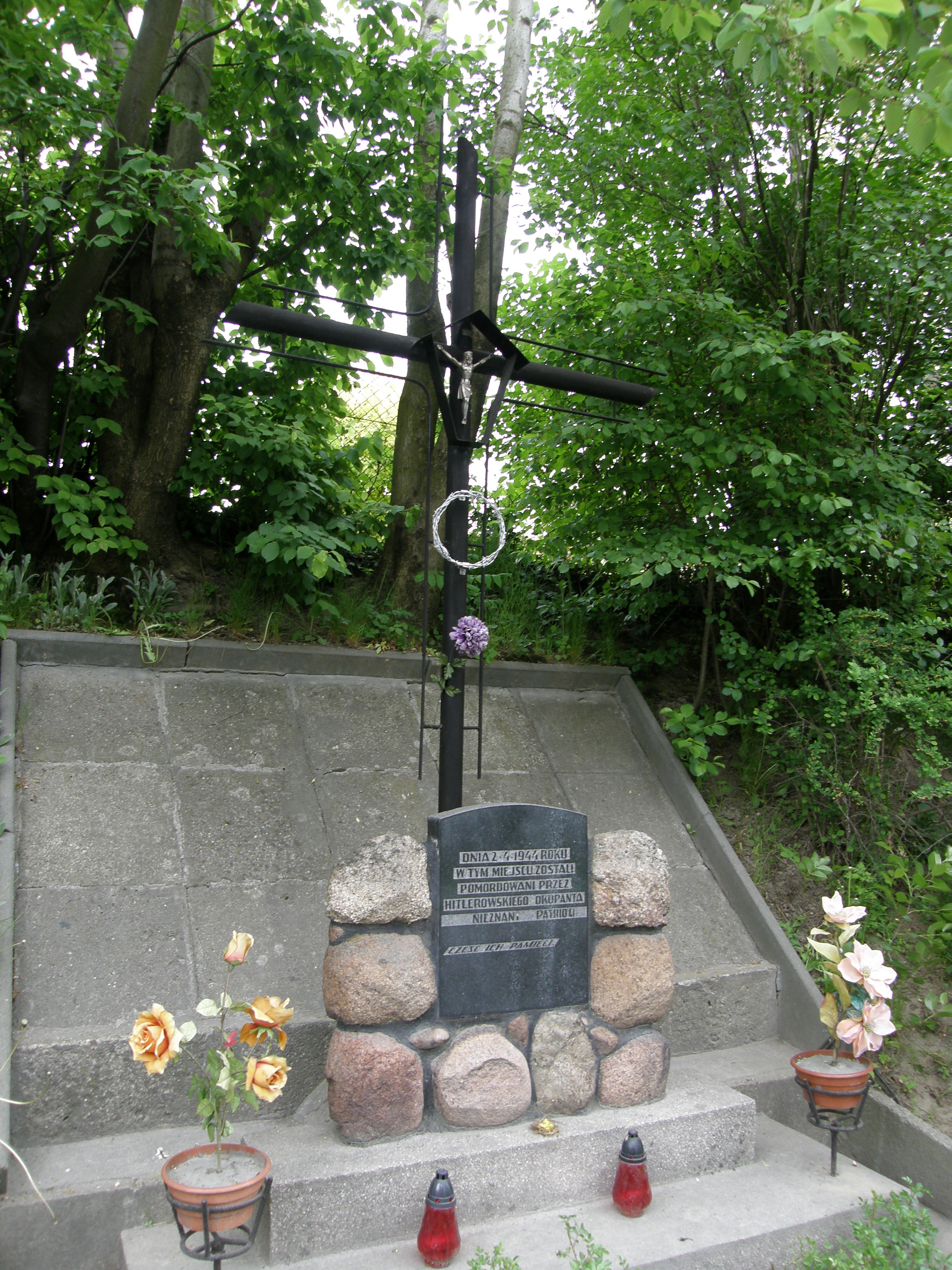
Memorial at the site of a German massacre of Poles carried out in April 1944

During the German invasion of Poland, which started World War II, on September 9, 1939, Łańcut was a place of fierce defense by Poles under the command of Colonel Stanisław Maczek, who would become one of the Polish heroes of World War II. During the subsequent German occupation, the Einsatzgruppe I entered the town between September 17 and October 5, 1939, to commit various atrocities against Poles. In November 1939, the Germans deceitfully requested the presence of Polish intelligentsia from the town and county at a supposed conference on the county's economic matters, at which they then arrested over 200 people, including local officials, teachers and priests (see Intelligenzaktion). Some of them were imprisoned in Rzeszów along with Poles from other towns of the region. A temporary prisoner-of-war camp for Polish soldiers was operated in Łańcut in 1939, and around 25,000 people were held there in mid-November 1939. Nevertheless, the Polish resistance movement was organized in the town, and since May 1940, underground Polish newspaper Odwet was distributed in Łańcut.

From 1942 onwards the German occupiers began transportation and murder of the Jewish community; very few of the community survived. The Germans executed several Poles in the town for rescuing Jews, while at least one Polish man managed to escape and survive. There is also a well-known case where a Jewish family from Łańcut was hidden from the Germans by the Polish Ulma family in the nearby village of Markowa. In 1944 the Germans discovered the hideout and murdered the Polish family and two hidden Jewish families, 16 people in total, including children. The town's architecture avoided significant damage during the war.

The last owner of Łańcut, Alfred Antoni Potocki, (14 June 1886 – 30 March 1958), was one of the richest men in prewar Poland, accumulating a fantastic collection of art during his tenancy. Shortly before the arrival of the Red Army in 1944, he loaded 11 railway carriages of a specially chartered train to Vienna, with his most valuable possessions (about 700 boxes of movable property) and fled to Liechtenstein. Most of these valuables were gradually sold off to finance a lavish lifestyle.

The Music Festival in Łańcut has been an annual event since 1961. The Festival is a series of modern and classical music concerts performed by distinguished European soloists, ensembles and choirs.

== Main sights ==
- The Łańcut Castle, also called the Lubomirski and Potocki Palace. It was built in 1628–1641 by Stanisław Lubomirski, rebuilt in 1894–1903 in the style of French Neo-baroque. At the end of the 19th century and the start of the 20th century, the palace was known for its expensive and rare furniture pieces and was used to host dignitaries and politicians. During World War II, the Nazis established their Polish headquarters in the palace. They robbed and pilfered the most expensive items. In the castle grounds there is a park with the little romantic castle, a coachhouse with a collection of carriages, a guest-house in the English style and other structures. The castle complex is a Historic Monument of Poland.
- The Łańcut Synagogue, completed in 1761. German invaders in 1939 attempted to burn the synagogue down, but were prevented by Count Alfred Antoni Potocki. Although plain on the exterior, the interior walls and ceiling are decorated with restorations of paintings and stuccowork from the 18th century and polychromies from the 19th – 20th centuries.
- The architectural complex of the ancient Church and the Dominican monastery (Rynek) rebuilt repeatedly, the oldest phase of the construction going back to the 15th century.
- The Parish Church of Saint Stanislaus (Farna Street) going back to the 15th century. Rebuilt in 1884–1900.
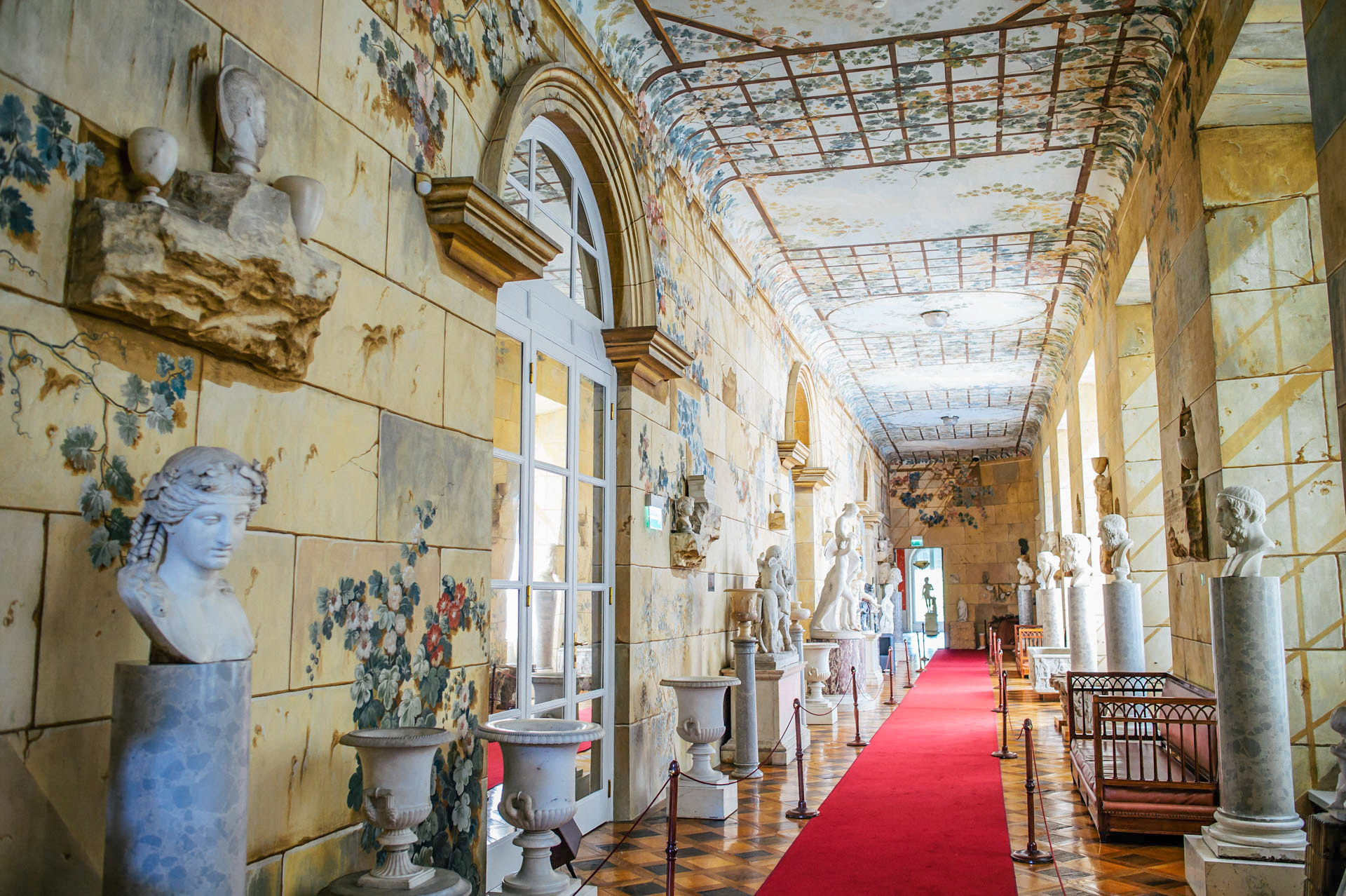
Castle interior

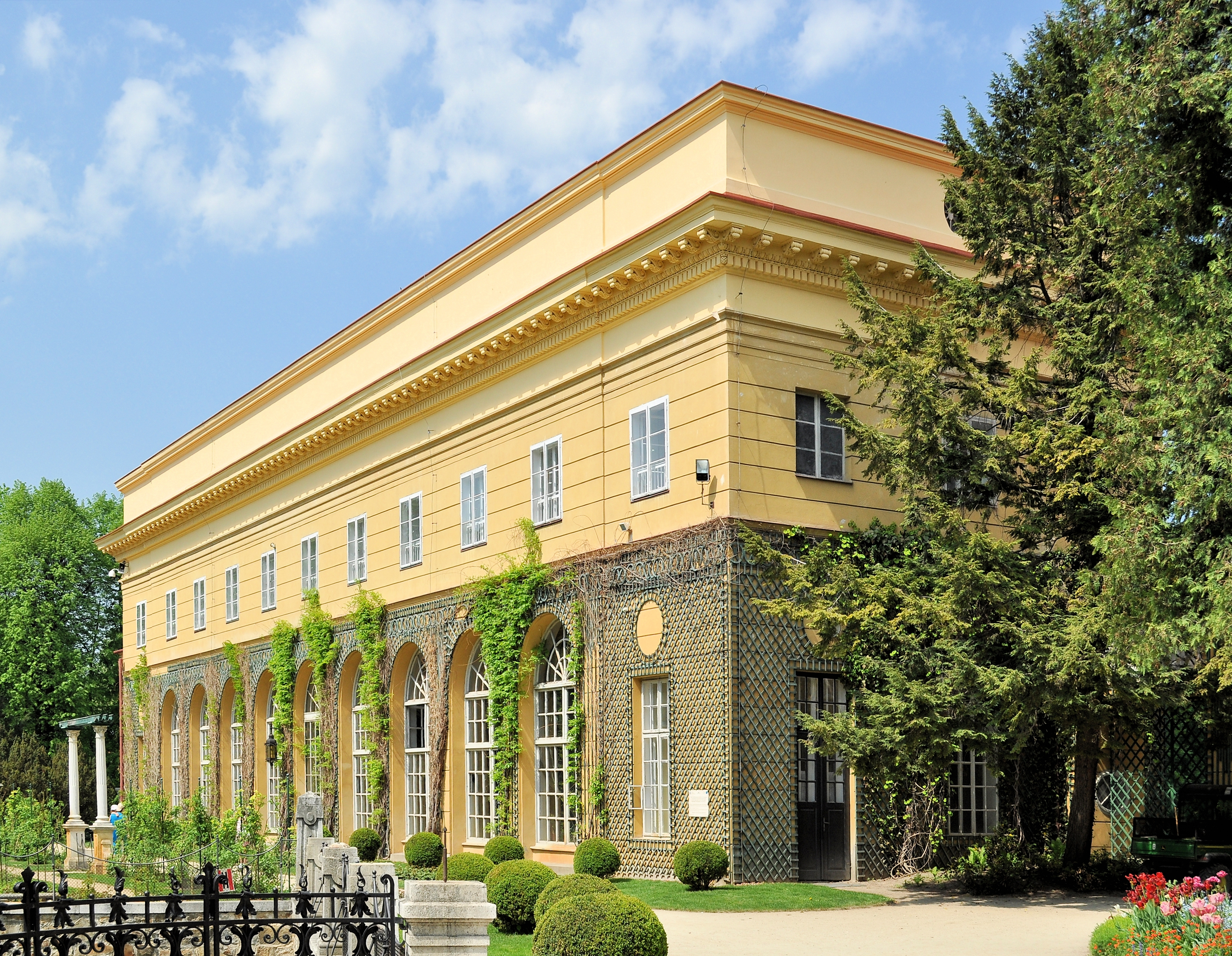
Orangery

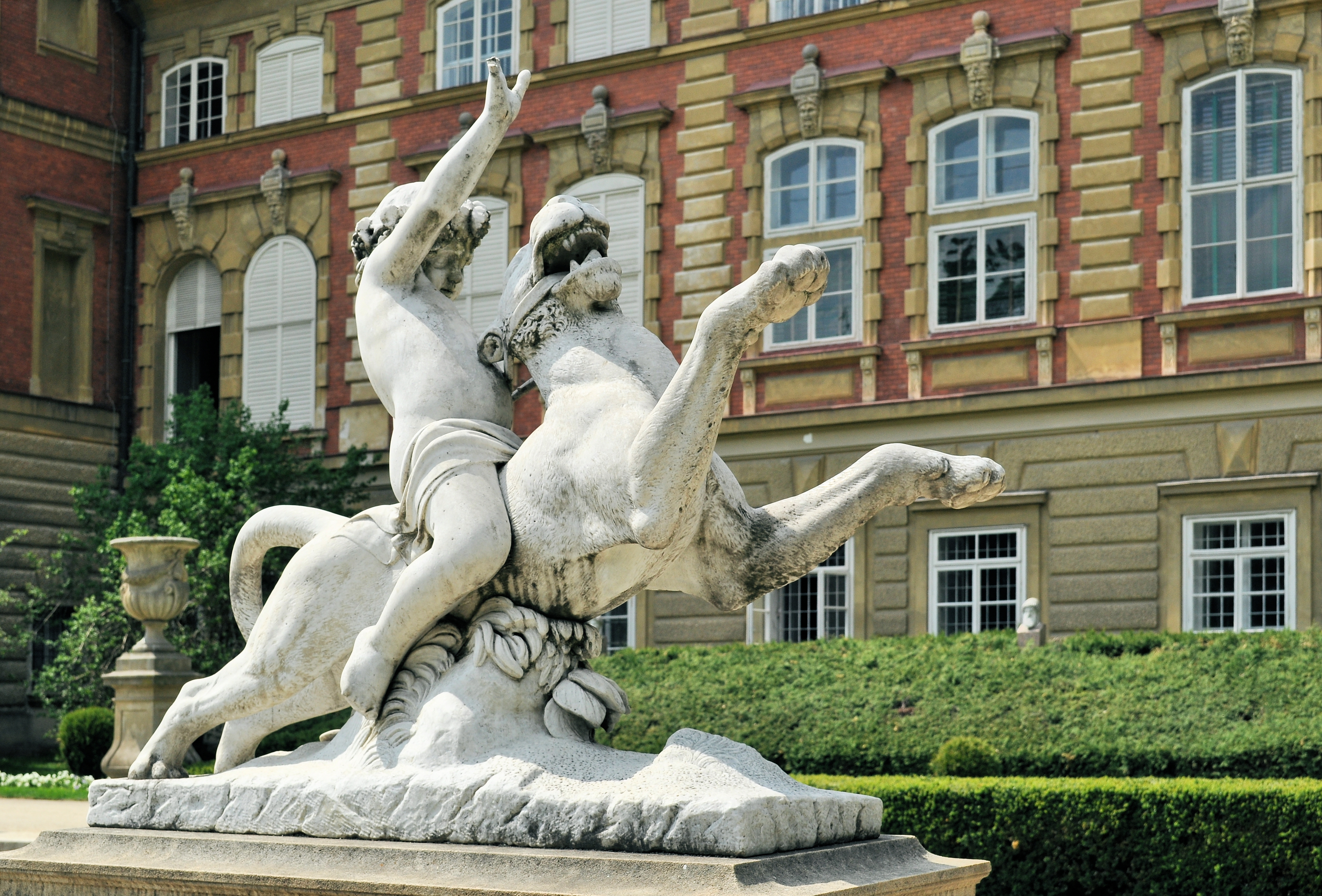
Statue of Bacchus in the castle park

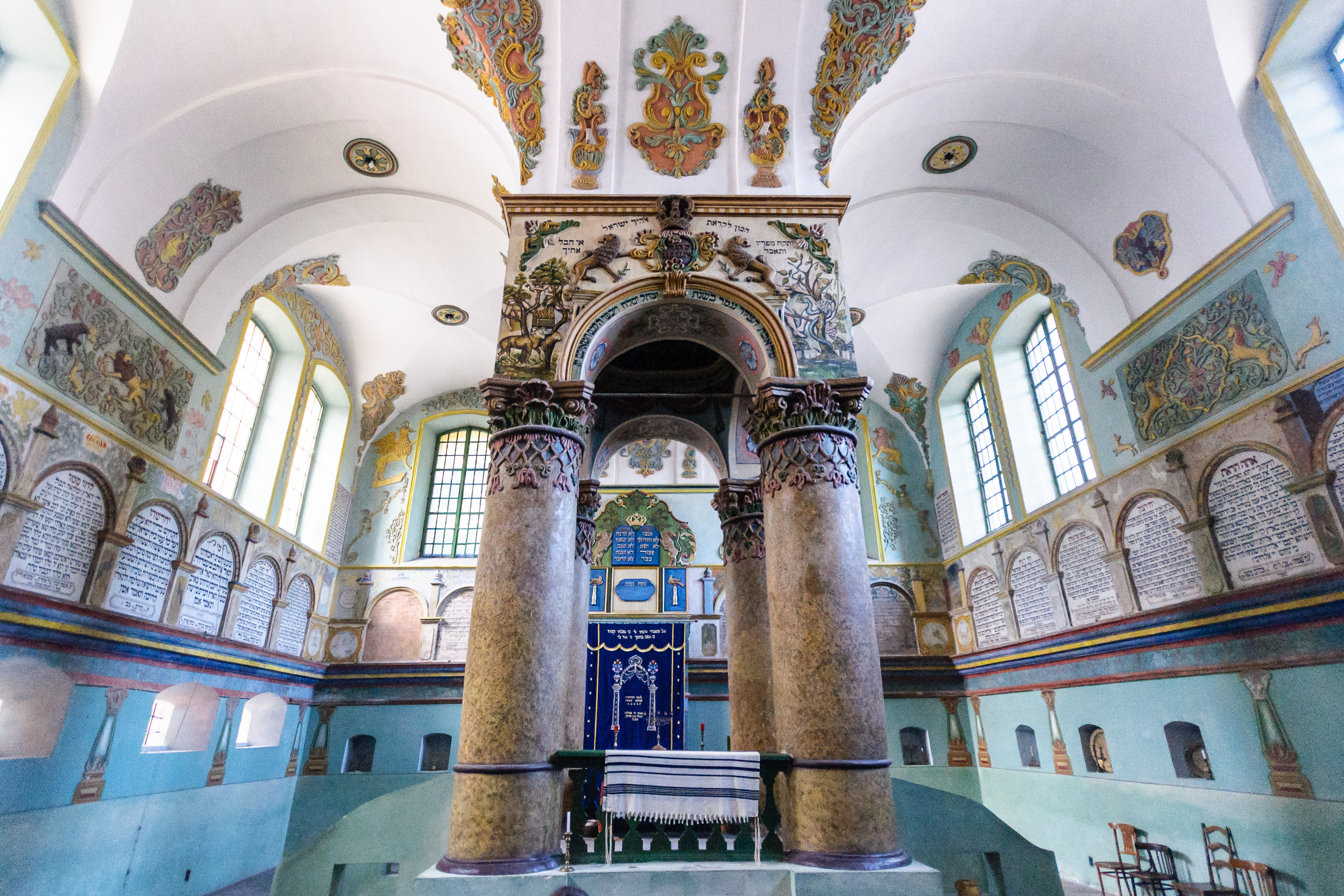
Interior of the Synagogue

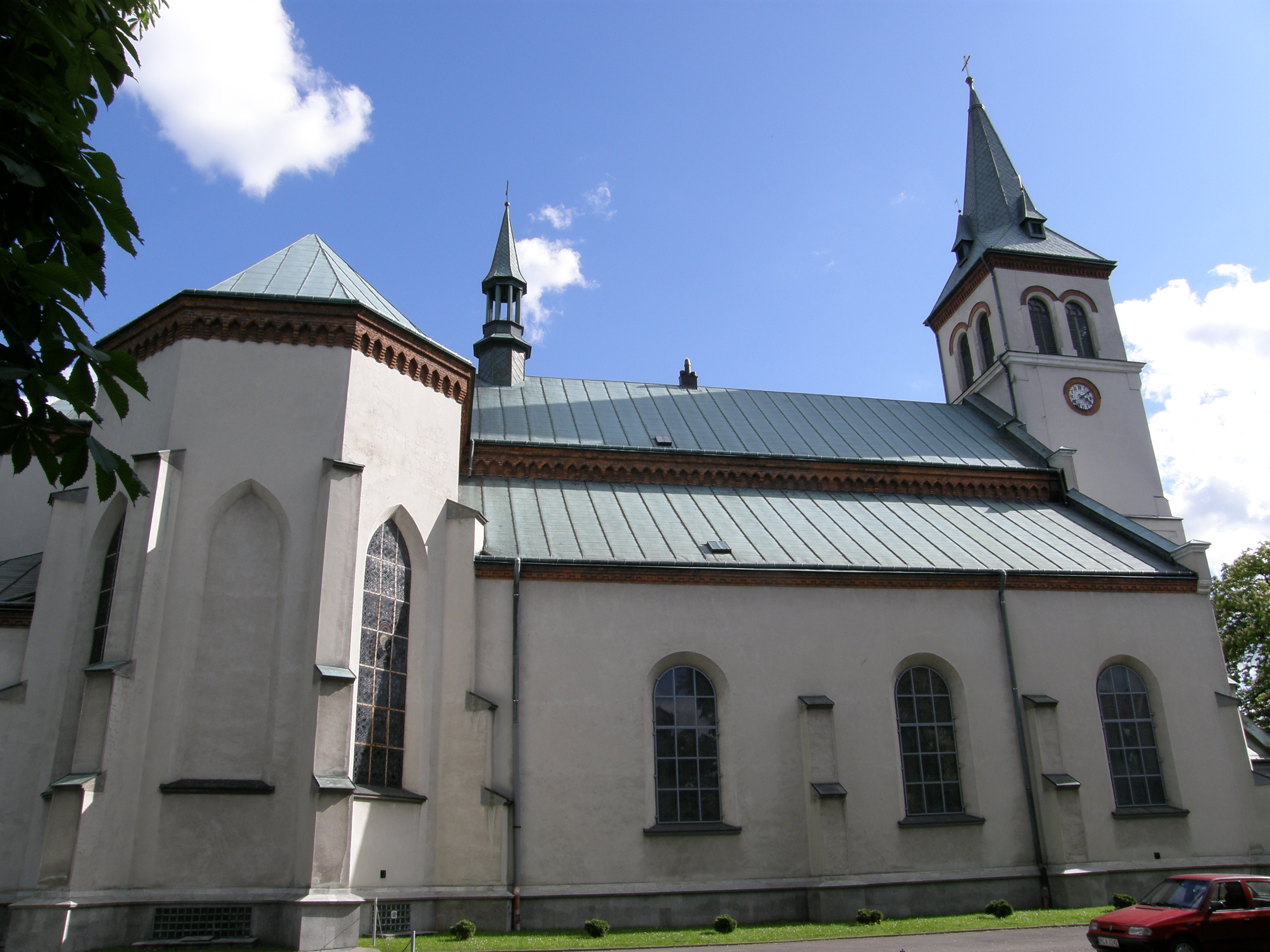
Parish Church

== Transport ==
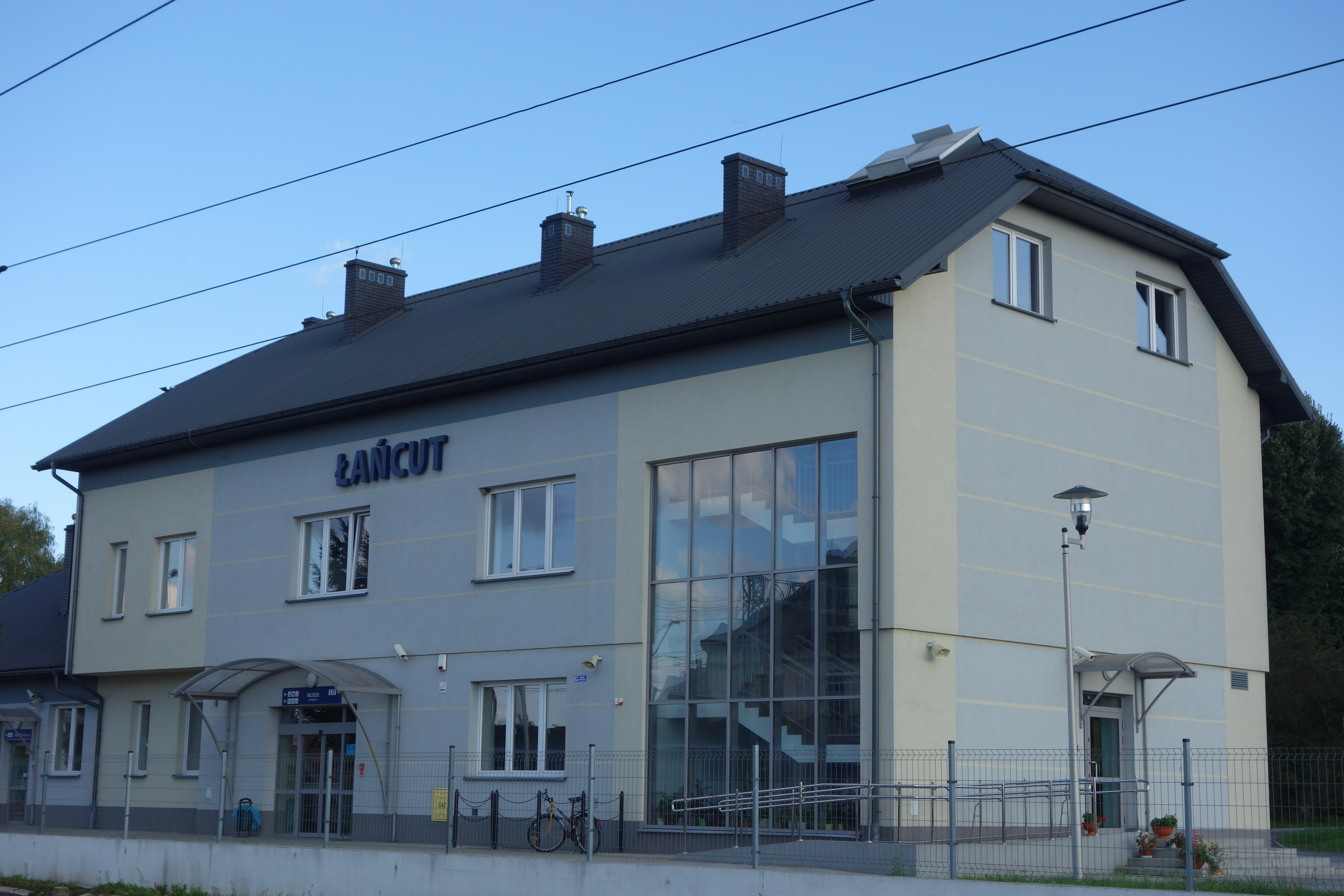
The Łancut railway station

Łańcut is located on the main West-East European E40 Highway, which goes from Calais in France via Belgium, across Germany, Poland, Ukraine and on to Russia and Kazakhstan. Other Polish cities located by the E40 highway are Wrocław, Opole, Katowice, Kraków, Tarnów, Rzeszów and Przemyśl.

The nearest airport is Rzeszów-Jasionka Airport located in the village of Jasionka, north of Rzeszów. It is about 18 kilometres (11 miles) north-west of Łańcut on the A881 and takes about 25–30 minutes by car. Scheduled passenger services include flights to: Warsaw (WAW), Dublin, London (Stansted), Bristol, UK, Birmingham, UK, New York City (JFK Airport, and Newark Liberty International Airport).

Łańcut has a railway station, located at Kolejowa Street 1. It is on the main line, Kraków Main station — Medyka. The line then continues on to Ukraine.

The bus station is located at the crossroads of Kościuszko Street and Sikorski Street.

== Sports ==
The most notable sports club is basketball team Sokół Łańcut, which competes since 2022/2023 in the Polish Basketball League, Poland's highest level league.

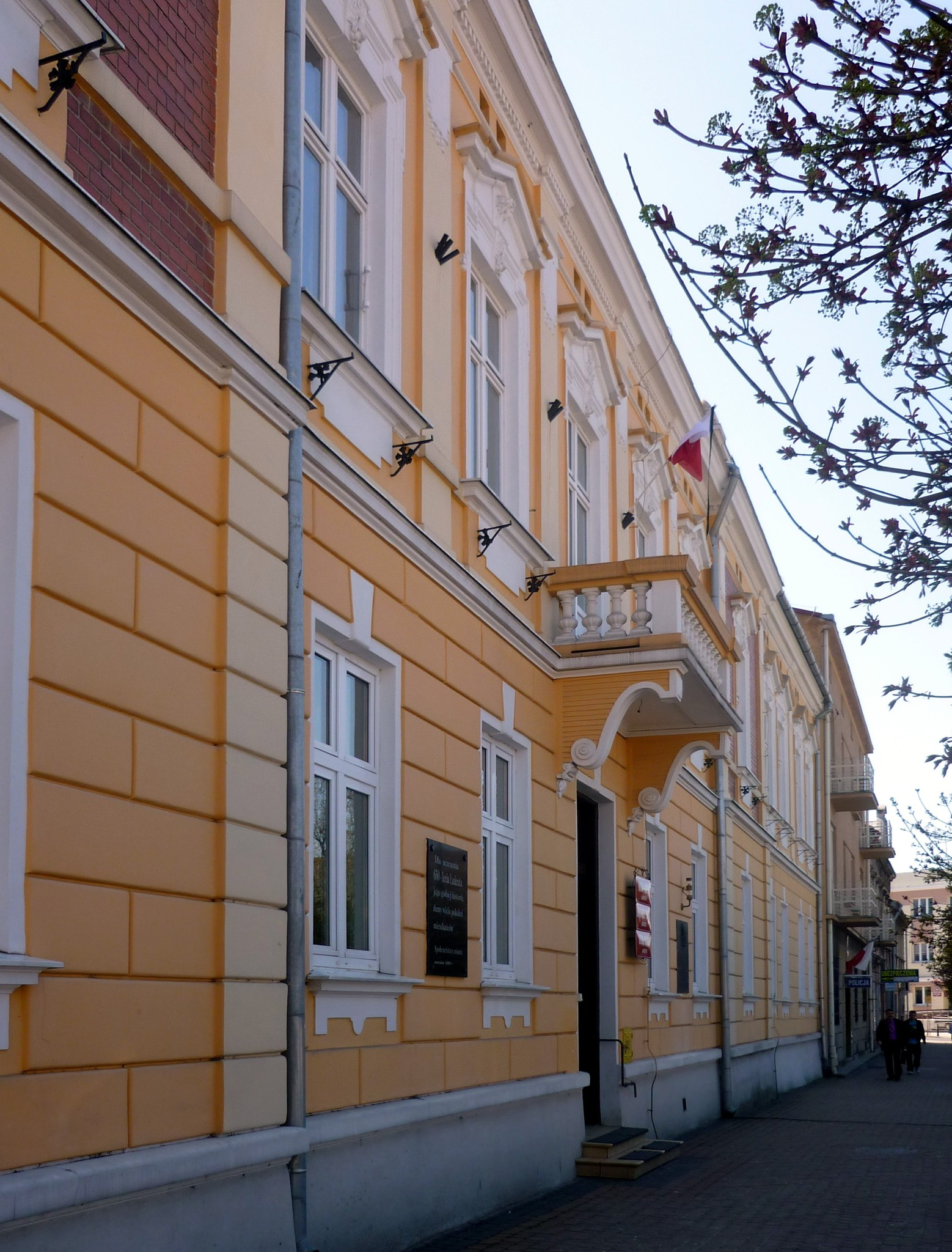
Town hall

== International relations ==
=== Twin towns – sister cities ===
Łańcut is twinned with:

Levoča, Slovakia; Litomyšl, Czech Republic; Piran, Slovenia; Mrągowo, Poland	Keszthely, Hungary; Tavira, Portugal; Uman, Ukraine	Balmazújváros, Hungary; Baktalórántháza, Hungary; Castelnuovo Bormida, Italy

== See also ==
- Walddeutsche
- Łańcut (vodka) is a brand of vodka.
