= Yuri Shefler =

Russian-born businessman (born 1967)

- Юрий Викторович Шефлер
- Born: 10 September 1967 (age 58); Oryol, Oryol Oblast, Soviet Union
- Citizenship: Russia, United Kingdom, Israel
- Education: Plekhanov Russian University of Economics (1996)
- Known for: Owner of SPI Group
- Spouse: Tatiana Kovylina (divorced 2021)
- Children: 4

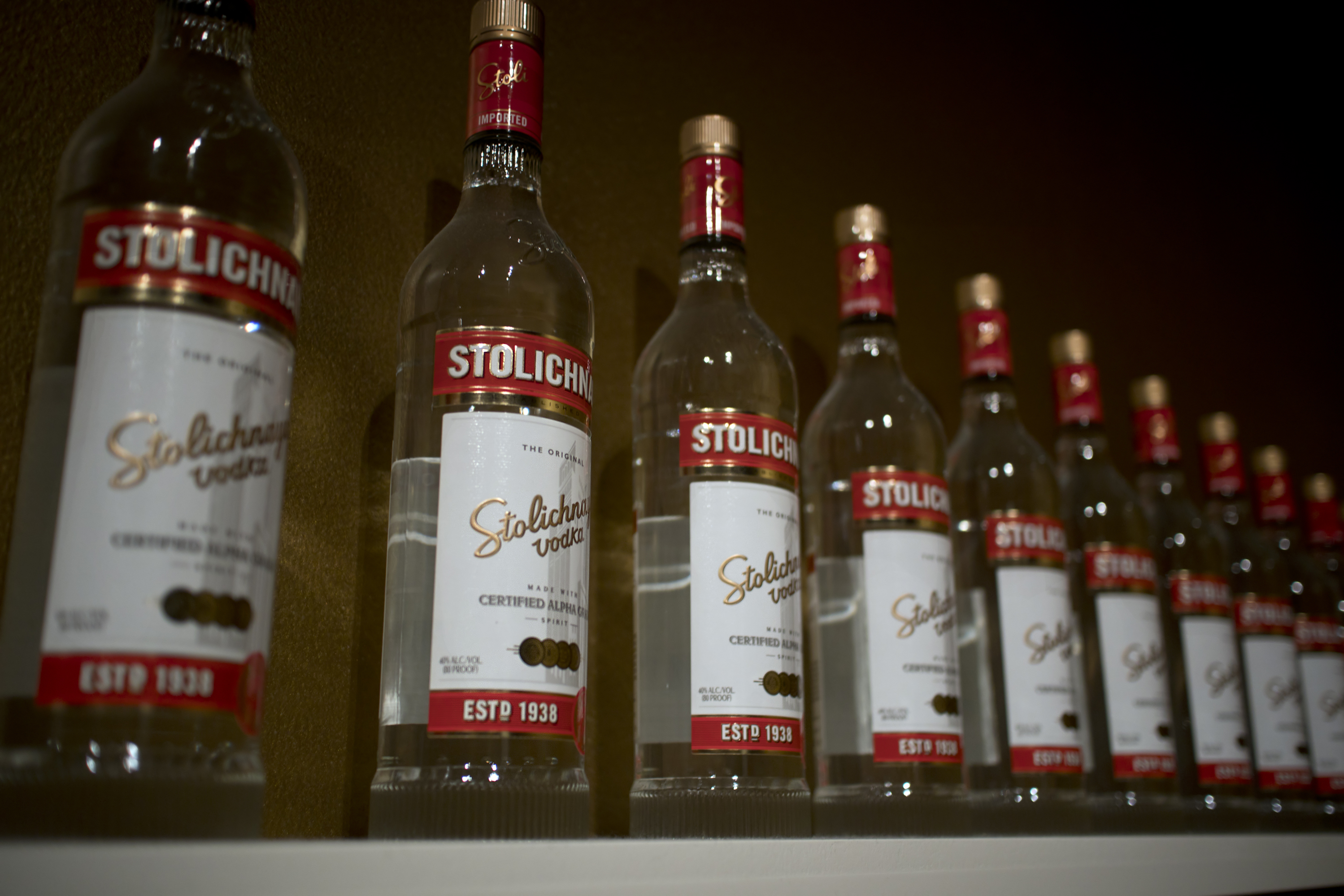
Anchorage Alaska Museum, Russia Exhibit - Stolichnaya vodka

Yuri Shefler (Russian: Юрий Викторович Шефлер; born 10 September 1967) is a Russian-born businessman. He is the owner of SPI Group, an international consortium that sells alcohol in 160 countries, most notably the Stolichnaya vodka brand. As of July 2025, his net worth was estimated at US$1.1 billion.

== Business career ==
Shefler left the Soviet Army in September 1987 and embarked on a career in business, which saw him running one of Moscow's leading shopping malls and Vnukovo Airlines.

He used to own one of the largest yachts in the world, Serene, with a length of 133.9 m (439 ft 4 in). In 2015 he sold Serene to Saudi Crown Prince Mohammed bin Salman for a reported $550 million. In March 2017 he bought Tulchan Estate on Speyside, Scotland's most expensive sporting estate.

On 17 February 2022, Brad Pitt said that Angelina Jolie sold to Shefler's wine group Tenute del Mondo, which is a subsidiary of Shefler's Stoli Group, her interest in the Château Miraval at Correns in Provence, France, which Pitt and Jolie purchased in 2008 for $28.4 million.

=== SPI Group ===
SPI Group produces and sells alcohol under 380 brands in 160 countries, most notably Stolichnaya vodka. SPI Group also owns Louisiana Spirits Company, Fabrica de Tequilas Finos in Mexico and Achaval Ferrer in Argentina. A subsidiary of SPI Group, Luxembourg-based Amber Beverage Group Holding S.à r.l. owns Latvian-based SIA Amber Beverage Group, which in turn owns Latvijas Balzams which manufactures Riga Black Balsam.

Shefler's SPI Group has been involved in a decades-long legal dispute with the Russian state-owned company FKP Sojuzplodoimport (FKP) over ownership of the Stolichnaya and Moskovskaya trademarks. In 2020, the Dutch Supreme Court ruled that the rights belonged to Russia and ordered SPI Group to stop selling its products in Benelux.

In 2022, Shefler was ordered to pay a former UK executive over £1.6 million after sacking him when he complained about pay cuts.

== Personal life ==
Shefler was born to a Russian Jewish family in Oryol. He has citizenship in the United Kingdom and Israel.

He was formerly married to Tatiana Kovylina, a Russian model who previously worked for Victoria's Secret; they separated in 2021. They have four children together, and lived together in Geneva, Switzerland. He has since been linked to Ksenia Sukhinova, who was Miss Russia 2007, and Miss World 2008.

As reported by Forbes in March 2022, Shefler had an estimated net worth of $1.5 billion.
