= Ukrainian Balsam =

Herbal liquor

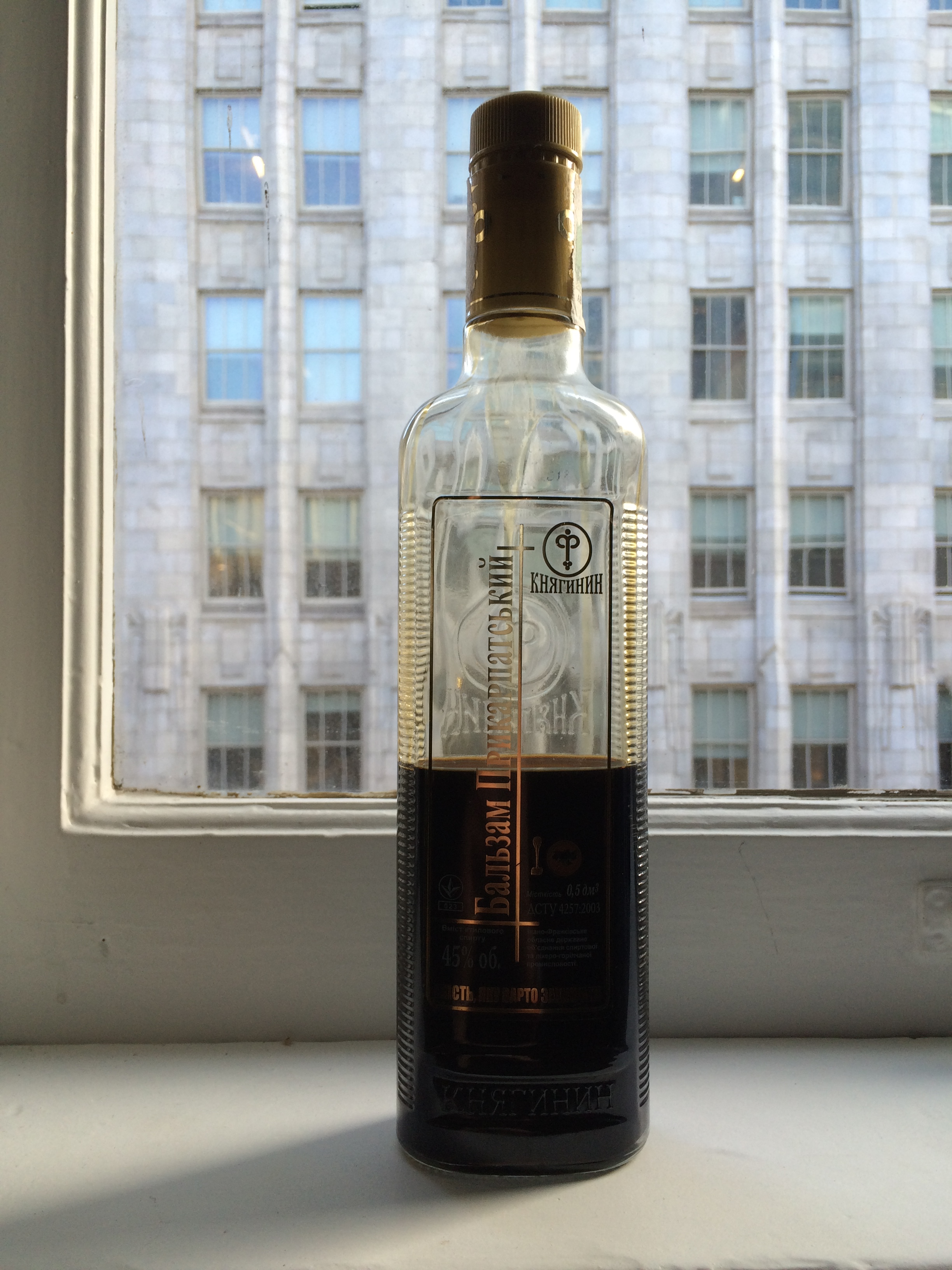
Ukrainian Balsam

Ukrainian Balsam is a Carpathian variety of a traditional, herbal, high-alcohol-content (35-45%) liqueur from Ukraine. It is aromatic and almost pitch black in color. It originally may have been used for medicinal purposes.

== See also ==
- Balsam (drink)
  - Riga Black Balsam
  - Krasnaya Polyana Balsam
- Bitters
- Digestif
- Flavored liquor
