= Stolichnaya =

Russian vodka brand

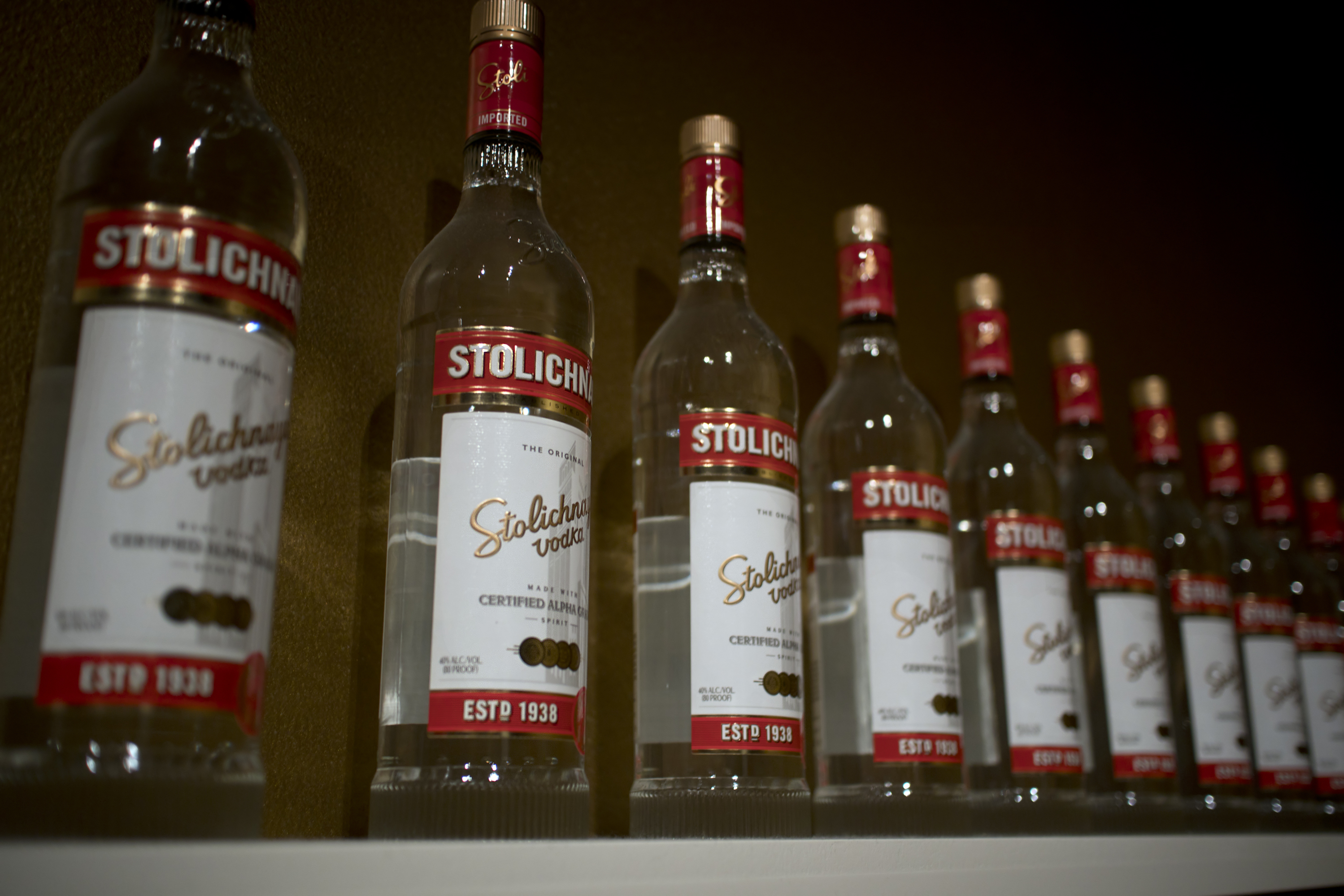
- Bottles of Stolichnaya vodka of an exhibit at the Russia Museum in Anchorage, Alaska
- Type: Vodka
- Manufacturer: FKP Soyuzplodoimport; SPI Group in Riga, Latvia
- Distributor: Sojuzplodoimport; SPI Group
- Origin: Russia
- Introduced: 1901; 125 years ago
- Alcohol by volume: 40%
- Proof (US): 80
- Variants: Stolichnaya Elit; Stolichnaya Flavoured Premium vodka
- Related products: List of vodkas
- Website: kristall.ru; spimport.ru

Stolichnaya (Russian: Столичная) is a vodka made of wheat and rye grain. It originated in the Soviet Union in 1938. There are two versions of the vodka: the version found outside Russia is made in Latvia, while the version found inside Russia is made there. With the dissolution of the Soviet Union the ownership of Stolichnaya has been disputed between the Russian state-owned company FKP Sojuzplodoimport and SPI Group, a private company chartered in Luxembourg. SPI Group have sold their version as Stoli since 2022.

== Name and logo ==
The name Stolichnaya is pronounced in Russian [stɐˈlʲit͡ɕnajə]. The word is the adjectival form of столица (stolitsa), meaning "capital city". The Soyuzplodoimport bottle label features the words "Stolichnaya Vodka" in gold cursive script over a drawing of a Moscow landmark, the recently rebuilt Hotel Moskva.

In March 2022 the Stoli Group changed the name of its vodka to its nickname, Stoli, as a "direct response to Russia's invasion of Ukraine".

== Production process ==
As of 2007 fermentation of Stolichnaya starts with Russian winter wheat and rye grains and pure glacier water and takes about 60 hours. Once fermentation is complete, the resulting liquid is distilled four times, to a strength of 96.4% alcohol by volume (ABV). That spirit is diluted to bottling strength using more glacier water. It is then filtered through quartz sand and activated carbon and, finally, through woven cloth.

SPI, the company controlled by Yuri Shefler, produces Stolichnaya in Latvia at Latvijas Balzams, using Latvian water but alcohol from a distillery in Tambov, Russia. In response to the Russian invasion of Ukraine in 2022, SPI announced that they would begin sourcing all of their alcohol from Slovakia instead of Russia.

== History ==
Stolichnaya has its origins in the Moscow State Wine Warehouse No. 1 which was opened in 1901 by the authorities to ensure higher quality vodka production.

There is confusion about the actual birth date of Stolichnaya vodka. The earliest confirmed production date is 1948, but the label design clearly predates 1946. It is likely that it was created by V. G. Svirida around 1944. There is a trademark registration dated 1938, which is sometimes quoted as another birth date.

In 1953, Stolichnaya was introduced at the international trade show in Bern and received a gold medal. Before the dissolution of the Soviet Union, the product was made at a distillery in Lviv, Ukraine, for export. In the early 1990s, the distillery had a joint venture established with the Edgar M. Bronfman associated firm Seagram.

In 1972, the PepsiCo company (Note: To assist the PepsiCo company with the complexities of importing and exporting with the USSR, PepsiCo acquired the 1934 founded importing firm Monsieur Henri Wines (MHW), which had extensive experience with imports into and exports from the USSR, and made it a wholly owned subsidiary.) (Note: The 1969 created VTO "Soyuzplodoimport" (Russian: ВТО«Союзплодоимпорт») dealt with vegetable products such as tea, coffee, cocoa beans, and, of course, Soviet alcohol including both champagne and vodka. In 1966, the Ministry of Foreign Trade (Russian: Министерство внешней торговли) divided the commodity flows between VTO "Soyuzplodoimport" and "Prodintorg" (Russian: "Продинторг") which dealt with agricultural products of animal origin.) struck a barter agreement with the government of the Soviet Union, in which PepsiCo was granted exportation and Western marketing rights to Soviet alcohol, namely, Stolichnaya vodka and Nazdorovya champagne from Abrau-Durso, in exchange for importation and Soviet marketing of Pepsi-Cola. (Note: In 1938, the Pepsi Cola Company registered the right to exclusive use of the trademark in the territory of the Soviet Union with the Trademark Registration Bureau of the People's Commissariat of Trade of the USSR.) (Note: After losing the 1960 United States presidential election, Richard Nixon, who became a partner at Mudge Rose Guthrie Alexander & Ferdon and was close to PepsiCo's CEO Donald Kendall, gained employment as an attorney representing PepsiCo's interests.) This was the first cooperation of food production between the United States and the USSR during détente, which began on 1 June 1972 after Richard Nixon returned from a summit in Moscow in late May 1972. This exchange led to Pepsi-Cola being the first American consumer product to be produced, marketed and sold in the USSR. (Note: Although PepsiCo wanted its bottling plant located at the resort town of Sochi, inadequate water supplies near Sochi caused the bottling site to be at the Novorossiysk brewery "Pino" (Russian: новороссийский пивзавод "Пино") which began producing Pepsi-Cola for the USSR on 31 May 1974. In the 1970s, Novorossiysk received its fresh water shipments on tankers from Tuapse. Although the Troitsky Group water pipeline (TGV) (Russian: «Троицкий групповой водопровод» (ТГВ)) was established in 1971, the Troitsky Group water pipeline (TGV) brought fresh water from artesian wells through the mountains to Novorossiysk much later. Additional plants in Moscow and Leningrad were producing Pepsi later and, by 1989, PepsiCo had 21 factories in the Soviet Union. As of 2017, the original Soviet era PepsiCo plant in Novorossiysk brews and bottles Novoross beer (Russian: пиво «Новоросс»).)

Directly after the collapse of the Soviet Union, Stolichnaya vodka continued to be produced for export in several of the post-Soviet states, including Ukraine. The bottles retained their Soviet-era labels.

During the dissolution of the Soviet Union, steps were taken to transform state-owned Stolichnaya producer VO Sojuzplodoimport (later VVO Sojuzplodoimport) into a privately held company. Since the early 90s, the personnel of the vodka factory and control of the trademarks had been managed by VAO Sojuzplodoimport (later: VZAO Sojuzplodoimport). In 1997 they were transferred to ZAO Sojuzplodimport which sold them to the SPI (Spirits) group in 1999.

The SPI Group is a private company chartered in Luxembourg, founded and owned by Russian billionaire Yuri Shefler, that distributes a wide variety of Russian spirits, having purchased a number of former Soviet brands and operations. Stoli Group USA is a unit of SPI Group that markets Stoli vodka. FKP produces in Kaliningrad, Russia, for the Russian market and the Benelux market. SPI Group distributes and produces from Latvia. FKP Sojuzplodoimport and the SPI Group have been in dispute over the ownership of various trademarks since 2003.

== Trademark ownership and production rights ==
Since 2003, after the dissolution of the Soviet Union, the Stolichnaya trademark has been the subject of dispute between distributors, predominantly the SPI Group and Russian state-owned Sojuzplodoimport. The SPI group has held the rights from the legal successor as a result of a privatisation, while the Russian government holds that the privatisation has never been fully effected.

=== Russia ===
In August 1991, the Soviet patent office revoked the Soviet state-owned company's right to use the Stolichnaya name in Russia. However, in 2002, a Moscow court ruled, on appeal, that as a result of the incomplete privatisation, the Russian government should get back the rights to the Stolichnaya brand name from SPI Group since SPI had not obtained the rights from the legal holder. An appeal by SPI to the European Court of Human Rights was rejected.

=== Austria ===
In 2014, the Oberlandesgericht (OLG, "higher regional court") of Linz decided that FKP could not base its request on the nullity of the privatization/transformation, as that possibility had a term of limitation of 10 years according to the applicable law in Russia (if the term of limitation defense had been actively relied upon), and thus FKP could not claim that SPI had not obtained the trademarks from the owner.

In 2020, the Austrian Oberste Gerichtshof (OGH, "Supreme Court of Justice") – the highest civil court in Austria – upheld the 2014 decision. SPI has therefore exhausted all options in the Austrian justice system.

=== Benelux ===
In the Benelux countries (Belgium, Luxembourg, and the Netherlands), SPI has been the distributor, but use of the trademarks was challenged in 2006 by the FKP Sojuzplodoimport. In 2015 a Dutch court held that, according to Russian and Soviet law (and a term of limitation had not been invoked regarding the transfer), the privatisation had not taken place, and that Benelux law and (when provisions were insufficient) Dutch law applied to the transfer of the trademarks. the court ruled that SPI had obtained the trademarks in bad faith from an entity that wasn't the legitimate owner. The trademarks should be transferred back to FKP Sojuzplodoimport and SPI could not use the term "Russian" on its vodka.

After the verdict, SPI stopped distribution of Stolichnaya and started selling "Stoli" with the motto "Same Vodka. Different label". That was forbidden by a Dutch judge in July 2015, on the grounds that it infringed the rights of FKP Sojuzplodoimport. FKP Sojuzplodoimport planned to start selling Stolichnaya in the Netherlands on 1 September 2015.

The Benelux trademarks were seized in March 2024 to enforce a $50 billion arbitration claim by former shareholders of the oil company Yukos against the Russian Federation.

=== Other European states ===
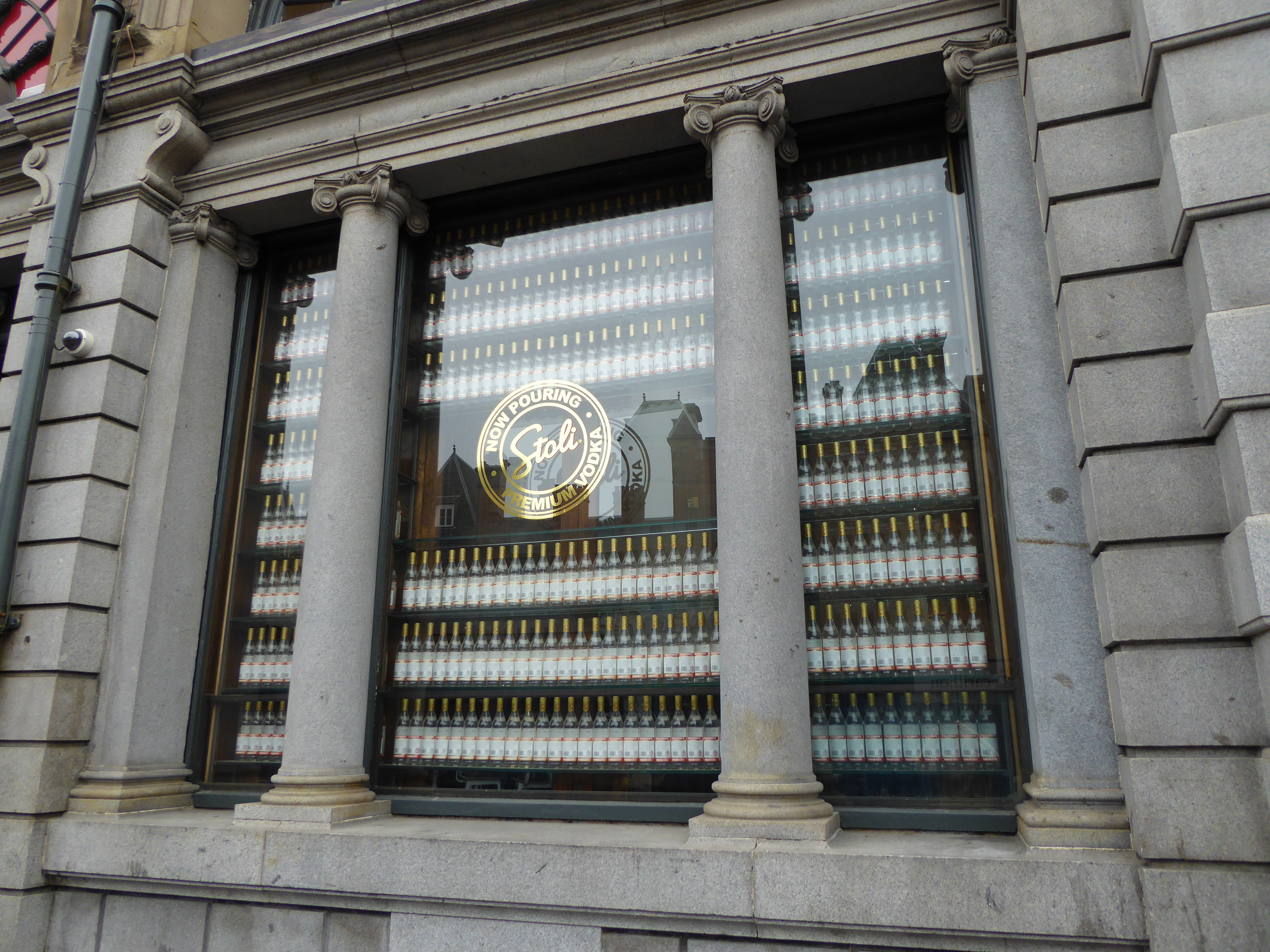
Stolichnaya vodka on display in Newcastle, England in 2015

SPI Group holds the rights to several Stolichnaya trademarks in the United Kingdom, Ireland, Italy, Denmark, Portugal, the Czech Republic, Spain, Cyprus, Poland, Norway and Iceland. In a lawsuit before the Court of The Hague, FKP Sojuzplodoimport sought an order to have the trademarks returned to it from several SPI companies. The Hague court assumed jurisdiction based on two Brussels Regime instruments: Brussels Regulation 44/2001 (for the EU countries) and the 2007 Lugano Convention (Norway, Iceland). It ruled that, because the dispute did not relate to trademark validity (for which national courts have jurisdiction) but to trademark registration, it did have jurisdiction, because a main defendant was located in the Netherlands. To evaluate the validity of the trademarks, it would use the national law of the trademarks concerned.

=== United States ===
PepsiCo had been the distributor of Stolichnaya based on an agreement with the Soviet government. The change in control of the trademarks and production facilities led to several lawsuits over which company could market vodka under the Stolichnaya name in the United States. On November 20, 1992, a US federal judge ruled that PepsiCo could maintain the exclusive right to the name in the United States, because allowing others to market under the name would bring a "risk of irreparable harm" to the trademark.

In 2009 William Grant & Sons signed an agreement with SPI Group to distribute Stolichnaya in the United States, taking over from PepsiCo. The William Grant & Sons distribution contract expired on December 31, 2013, and was not renewed, due to the desire of the SPI Group to manage its brand directly.

In 2006 FKP Sojuzplodoimport brought an action against the owner of the mark Spirits International N.V., et al. in 2005. The district court dismissed almost all claims on a motion to dismiss, holding that the incontestable status of the registration meant that FKP Sojuzplodoimport couldn't challenge ownership. However, in 2009, the Court of Appeals for the Second Circuit overturned that decision, stating that FKP Sojuzplodoimport could challenge the validity of the assignment of the trademark.

In 2011, after examining the grant given to FKP Sojuzplodoimport by the Russian government, the district court held, and the appeals court affirmed in 2013, that the Russian government had not transferred full ownership of the marks to FKP Sojuzplodoimport, so FKP Sojuzplodoimport wasn't the registrant of the mark. Since FKP Sojuzplodoimport had dismissed all claims except for infringement of a registered mark, it did not have standing and the case was dismissed.

FKP Sojuzplodoimport and the Russian government then signed a new document that assigned the trademarks to FKP Sojuzplodoimport in every way possible, and FKP Sojuzplodoimport filed a new lawsuit against Spirits International N.V. In 2014 the district court heard testimony from experts on Russian law and reached the conclusion that, under Russian law, FKP Sojuzplodoimport could only manage property, not own it and, therefore, FKP Sojuzplodoimport did not have standing. However, in 2016, that decision was vacated by the Court of Appeals and the case went back to the district court.

On December 2, 2024, Stoli Group USA announced that they had filed for Chapter 11 bankruptcy protection, citing slowing demand for spirits, a cyberattack, and conflicts with Russia in court. On January 15, 2026, Stoli Group USA converted their Chapter 11 case to a Chapter 7 bankruptcy liquidation after their bankruptcy plan was rejected by a bankruptcy judge.

== Varieties ==
Stolichnaya is available in many varieties, including:

- Stolichnaya 80 proof (red label)
- Stolichnaya 80 proof (Cristall or gold)
- Stolichnaya 100 proof (blue label)
- Stoli Blakberi (Blackberry)
- Stoli Blueberi (Blueberry)
- Stoli Citros (Citrus)
- Stoli Cranberi (Cranberry)
- Stoli Gala Applik (Apple)
- Stoli Ohranj (Orange)
- Stoli Peachik (Peach; formerly named Stoli Persik)
- Stoli Razberi (Raspberry)
- Stoli Strasberi (Strawberry)
- Stoli Vanil (Vanilla)
- Stoli White Pomegranik (White Pomegranate)
- Stoli Wild Cherri (Wild Cherry)
- Stoli Chocolat Razberi (Chocolate and Raspberry)
- Stoli Hot (Jalapeño)
- Stoli Sticki (Honey)
- Stoli Chocolat Kokonut (Chocolate and Coconut)
- Stoli Salted Karamel (Salted Caramel)
- Stoli Gluten Free

Several of these offerings have performed well at international spirits ratings competitions. For example, the Elit label was awarded a silver medal at the 2011 San Francisco World Spirits Competition.

== Marketing ==
Stolichnaya's chief rival Russian Standard questioned the SPI-produced Stolichnaya's Russian authenticity, because it is bottled in Latvia, not Russia. Stolichnaya's global distributor Pernod Ricard responded by insisting that it is an authentic Russian vodka, because nothing is added or removed during the bottling.

In Eminem's 2010 music video for "Love the Way You Lie", Stolichnaya vodka was included in several scenes. The product placement began with actor Dominic Monaghan shoplifting a bottle of the vodka, after which he and actress Megan Fox drank from it on the roof of the liquor store.

Stolichnaya also advertises heavily during televised New York Yankees games, using digital banners behind home plate.

Roger Sterling, a main character in the American television series Mad Men, is also a fan of Stolichnaya, keeping a bottle in his office at all times. Sterling had the Stolichnaya sent from Greece.

The product has also been mentioned multiple times in the Netflix series Stranger Things.

== 2013 boycott ==
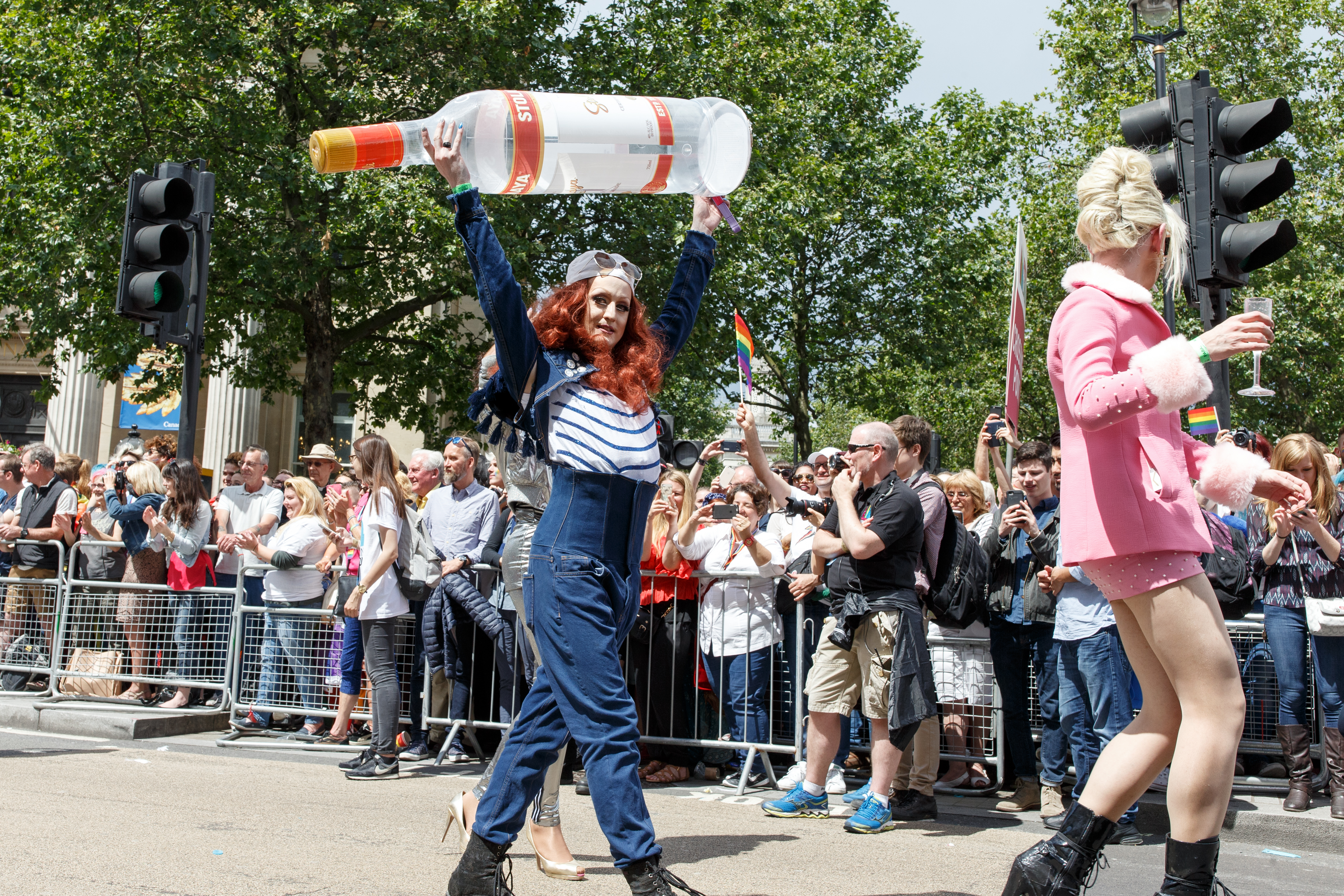
Inflatable Stolichnaya bottle at Pride in London 2016

In July 2013 columnist Dan Savage joined gay bars and clubs in calling for a boycott of Stolichnaya and other Russian vodkas. The boycott was in response to anti-gay laws enacted by the Russian government.

In response, SPI, which has rights to the brand outside of Russia and produces it on its own separate from Russian FKP Stolichnaya, released a statement expressing their opposition to Russia's anti-gay policies, stating that, "Stolichnaya Vodka has always been, and continues to be, a fervent supporter and friend to the LGBT community."

SPI announced that the company would be making a donation to a group working on behalf of Russian LGBT activists. Company CEO Val Mendeleev also insisted that the company is "not a Russian company", whilst acknowledging that at the time the company operates a distillery in Russia.
