= Kümmel (liqueur) =

Sweet liqueur flavored with caraway, cumin, and fennel seeds

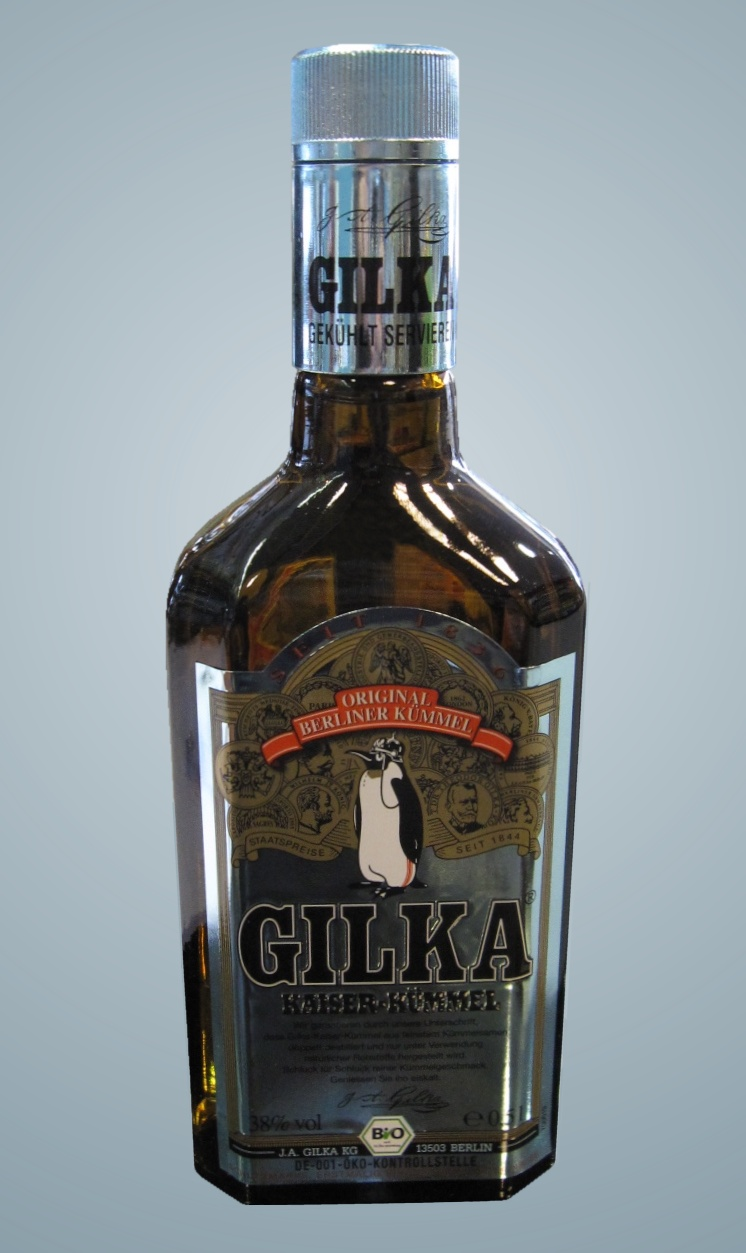
Kaiser-Kümmel by J. A. Gilka

Kümmel, kummel or kimmel (Latvian: ķimelis), is a sweet, colourless liqueur flavoured with caraway (German: Kümmel, Latvian: ķimenes) seeds, cumin and fennel.

Kümmel was first distilled in the Netherlands in the late 17th century; by 1823 the product had been adopted in the German lands (Germany would become as of 2019 the principal producer and market), and in then Russian-ruled Latvia, becoming known in many markets as "Blanckenhagen-Allasch" from its Latvian connections. Eastern Europe became as of 2007 the principal producer and market of kümmel.

== History ==
=== Origin ===
The earliest known kümmel recipe, attributed to a knight of the Livonian Order, dates from 1503. Some accounts record the legend that Lucas Bols (1652-1719) first distilled kümmel liqueur in the Netherlands in 1575—three-quarters of a century before he was born.

=== Spread ===
Persistent stories associate the popularity of kümmel (Russian: кюммель) in Russia with the tastes of a man with a reputation for imbibing: Tsar Peter I of Russia. (Note: Myths and legends about alcoholic drink abound, and legends can confuse designations and dates. Some accounts characterise kümmel primarily as anise-water. Peter I allegedly sampled the Bols product during his sojourn in Amsterdam in 1696. - before he arrived in the Netherlands in August 1697 during his Grand Embassy of 1697 to 1698.) Whether or not Peter I (r. 1682–1725) first introduced kümmel to Russia, he is credited with organizing its production there.

=== 19th century ===
Kümmel's popularity grew in the early 19th century. being produced by 1823

Allasch is a variety of Kümmel; it is also a caraway liqueur of around 40% ABV, usually flavoured with bitter almonds, anise, angelica root and orange peel. Invented in 1823 in Allasch, Governorate of Livonia, Russian Empire (now Allažmuiža in Latvia), and produced by Wilhelm von Blanckenhagen (1761–1840), who owned land around Allasch which included a pure and reliable water source, it was widely popular and produced there until 1944 when the Soviet Union occupied Latvia and expelled ethnic Germans from the region.

In 1830, Allasch was exhibited at the Leipzig Trade Fair and quickly gained popularity, being soon produced by local distilleries. It is now considered a Leipzig specialty, usually drunk as a digestif, although manufacturers also exist outside Leipzig.

Albert Wolfschmidt founded a distillery in Riga in 1847, producing vodka and schnapps, including kümmel and Riga Black Balsam.

In the mid-19th Century, kümmel was the rival of gin. Being made with caraway rather than juniper, it had the advantage that caraway has a carminative effect, reducing flatulence and the bloated feeling experienced after a heavy meal. By 1850, this "medicinal" benefit helped Ludwig Mentzendorff create a healthy business importing kümmel to Britain.

=== 20th century ===
During the 1905 Russian Revolution, the Blanckenhagen mansion was burned down. The distillery closed, and the entrepreneurial Mentzendorffs began producing their own kümmel in France. Baltic Germans moved to Germany as tensions between Russia and Germany grew, and several distilleries in Germany produced their own versions of kümmel, where it is still known as Allasch and is a popular digestif.

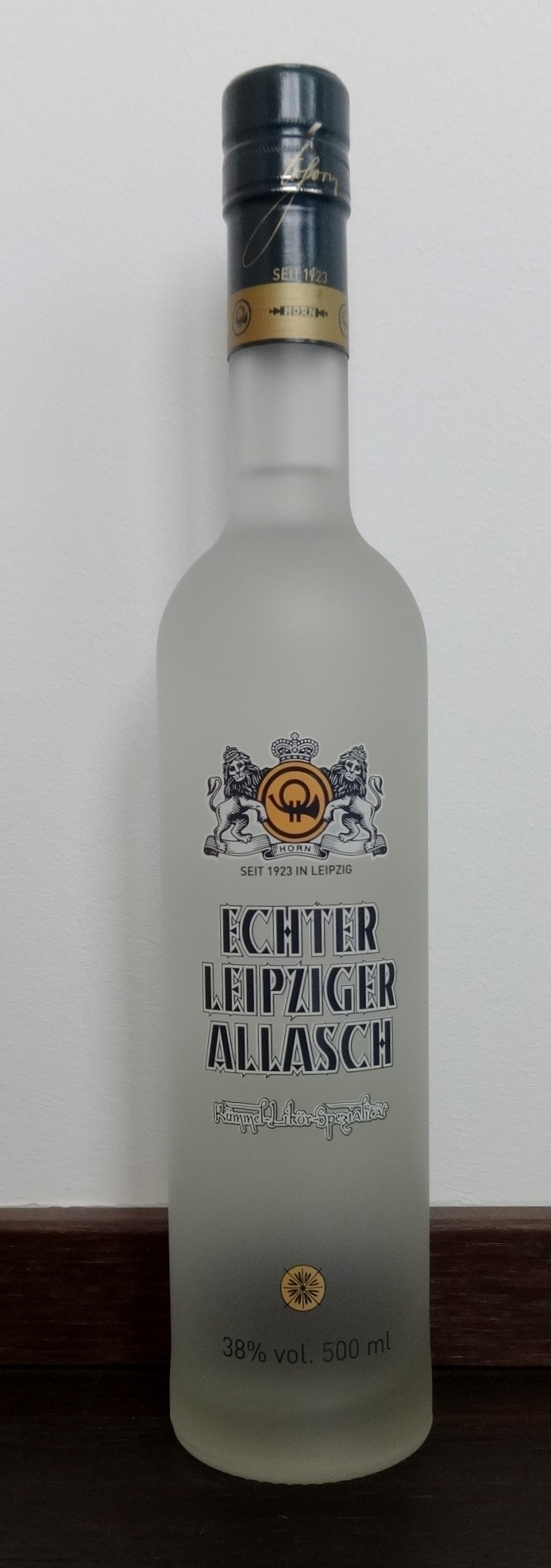
Leipziger Allasch

In Latvia, it is produced by Latvijas Balzams under the Latvianized name Allažu ķimelis.

In Scotland, it is a popular drink at many of the more traditional golf clubs because of its rumored ability to steady the nerves of golfers there, acquiring the nickname of "putting mixture".

A charming and evocative scene of drinking kümmel occurs in Rainer Werner Fassbinder's 1980 television miniseries, Berlin Alexanderplatz, where the character Franz Biberkopf speaks in the voices of glasses of kümmel and three beers in a philosophical dialogue as he evaluates the taste and downs each drink in turn.
