= Black balsam =

Black balsam may refer to:

- Balsam of Peru, a resinous balsam derived from trees of the genus Myroxylon, grown in Central and South America
- Riga Black Balsam, a traditional Latvian herbal liqueur
