= Kovylin =

Kovylin (Russian: Ковылин) is a Russian masculine surname, its feminine counterpart is Kovylina. Notable people with the surname include:

- Tatiana Kovylina (born 1981), Russian model
- Vladimir Kovylin (born 1954), Russian football coach and former player
