= Serene (yacht) =

Yacht built in 2011

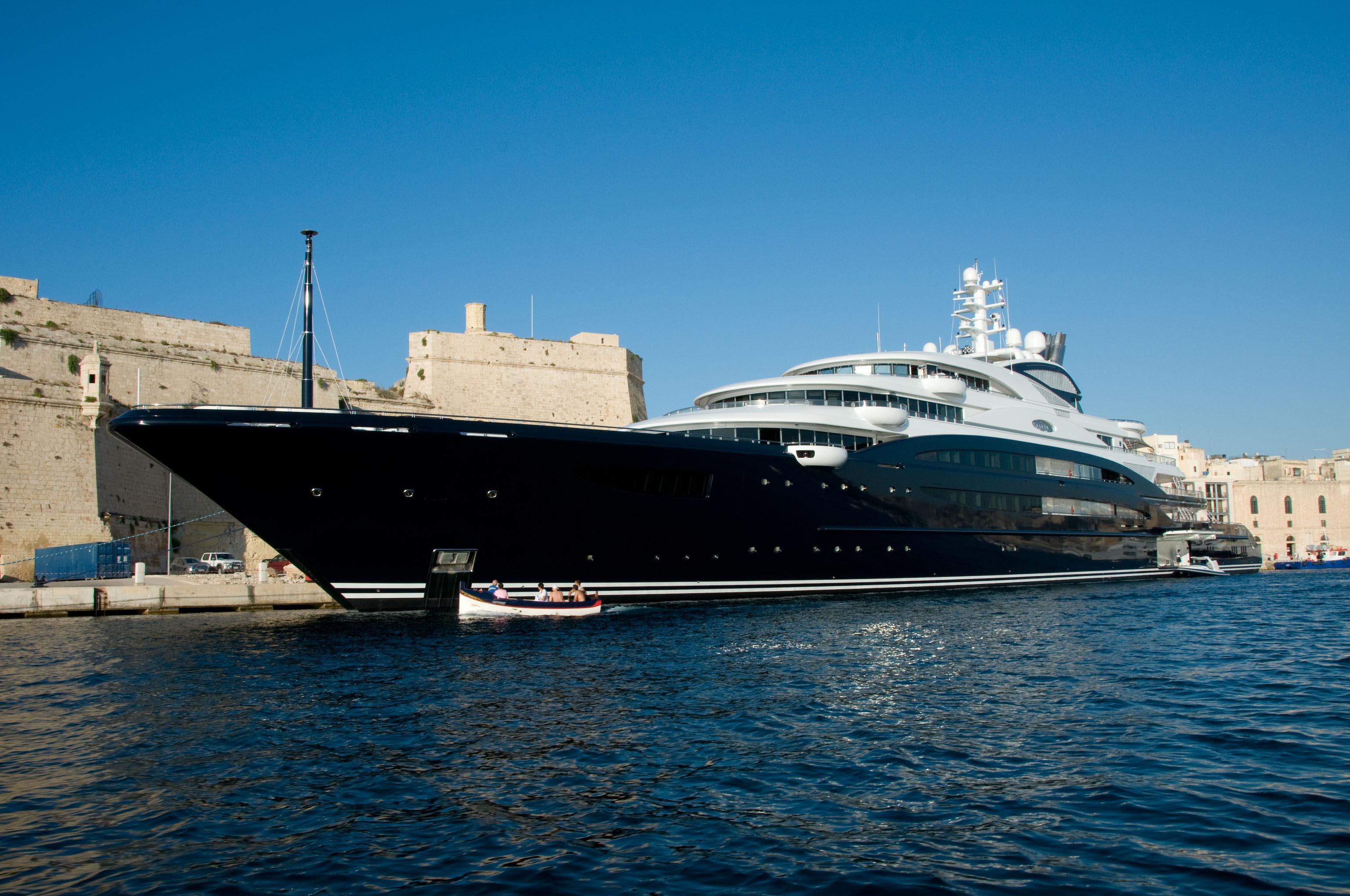
- Serene docked off Fort St. Angelo in Birgu, Malta

History
- Name: Serene
- Owner: Mohammed bin Salman
- Port of registry: Bermuda
- Builder: Fincantieri
- Launched: 5 July 2010
- Completed: August 2011
- Identification: IMO number: 1010090; MMSI number: 319021900

General characteristics
- Type: Superyacht
- Tonnage: 8,231 GT
- Length: 133.9 m (439 ft 4 in)
- Beam: 18.5 m (60 ft 8 in)
- Draft: 5.5 m (18 ft 1 in)
- Propulsion: Twin propellers
- Capacity: 24
- Crew: 52

Serene is one of the world's largest private superyachts. It was built by Italian shipyard Fincantieri with interior design by Reymond Langton Design. Now owned by Mohammed bin Salman, the Crown Prince of Saudi Arabia, the Serene was delivered to her original owner, Yuri Shefler, in August 2011. At delivery, she was one of the 10 largest yachts in the world with an overall length of 133.9 m (439 ft 4 in) and a beam of 18.5 m (60 ft 8 in).

== Ownership ==
The ship was built for Russian vodka tycoon Yuri Shefler for $330m. He had commissioned the ship in 2006 from Fincantieri and it was launched in 2010. At the time, it was the biggest yacht ever built in Italy. It was delivered to the client in August 2011 in Fincantieri's Muggiano Shipyard in La Spezia.

In 2014, while vacationing in the south of France, Mohammed bin Salman, then the deputy crown prince of Saudi Arabia, bought the vessel from Shefler for approximately €500 million.

== Incident at sea ==
In August 2017, Serene ran aground on a shallow rock reef in the Red Sea, 37 km (20 nautical miles) off the coast of Sharm El Sheikh. She sustained significant damage to her hull at the bow. The cause was reported to be a combination of navigational error and propulsion failure.

== Trivia ==
In the summer of 2014, Bill Gates leased the yacht for US$5 million per week for a family holiday. Gates was reportedly "in awe" of the ship following the holiday and was in negotiations to purchase it when bin Salman completed the purchase in 2 days without negotiation.

The Leonardo da Vinci painting Salvator Mundi was reported to be on board the yacht from some time in 2019 to late 2020.
