= Soyuzplodoimport =

Russian drink company

- Native name: Союзплодоимпорт
- Type: Federal enterprise
- Founded: 2002
- Founder: The Government of the Russian Federation
- Website: http://www.spimport.ru/

Soyuzplodoimport (Russian: Союзплодоимпорт, lit. 'Union-fruit-import') is a company based in Moscow. It owns the trademarks of different types of vodka, including the Stolichnaya and Moskovskaya brands. The company also markets canned herrings under its Stolichnaya brand as part of a partnership with Russian Sea Group.

== History ==
Soyuzplodoimport was established in 1966 to import food items, including cocoa beans, coffee, spices and vegetables, and to export vodka. In 1969, Soyuzplodoimport granted trademarks registrations for the vodka brands "Stolichnaya", "Moskovskaya" and "Russkaya". The company was not privatized, and remained under state ownership in the post-Soviet era.

In 1997, its then-president Yuri Shefler formed a new private company, Soyuzplodimport, almost the same name as the government-owned company, minus an 'o'. The new private entity then purchased some of Russia's main vodka brands from the government-owned Soyuzplodoimport for $300,000. An investigation by the Audit Commission valued the trademarks at $400 million. In October 2001, a Russian court ruled that Soyuzplodoimport was illegally privatized, and restored 17 vodka brands under its ownership.

In 2015, Soyuzplodoimport managed to win court cases against Shefler and regain control of the brand in the Netherlands, Belgium and Luxembourg. The decision was not final.

== Directors ==
- Yuri Zhizhin (1974 — 1987)
- Loginov Vladimir Grigorievich (2002 — 2009)
- Churkin Aleksandr Nikolaevich (July 2009 — December 2009)
- Алёшин Игорь Олегович (December 2009 — July 2018)
- Maklakov Aleksey Vitalievich (February 2019 — present)

== Activities ==
=== Intellectual property protection ===
Since 2003 the Federal Enterprise Soyuzplodoimport has been working to restore the rights of the Russian Federation to the «Stolichnaya», «Moskovskaya» and other trademarks around the world.
