= Krasnaya Polyana Balsam =

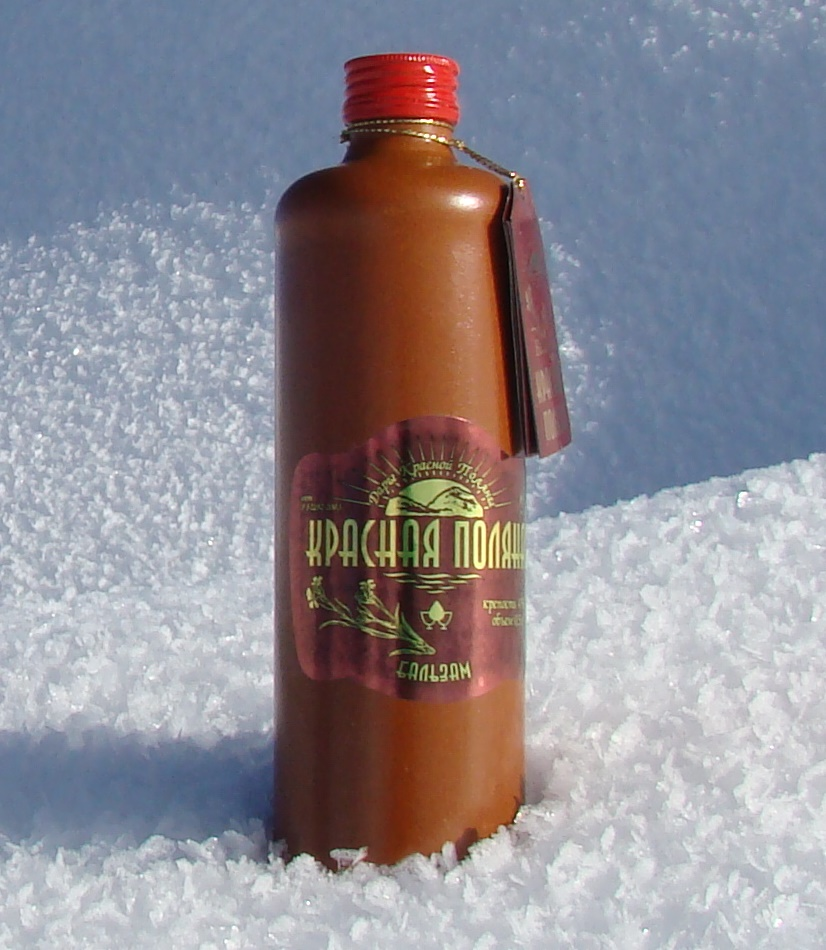
- Balsam bottle 0.7l
- Type: Mixed drink
- Ingredients: herbs
- Standard drinkware: Mug
- Standard garnish: Balsam
- Served: straight; with tea

Balsam "Krasnaya Polyana" (Russian: Бальза́м «Кра́сная Поля́на» Russian pronunciation: [ˈkrasnəjə pɐˈlʲanə]) is a dark brown strong herbal liqueur, 45% abv. It is one of the traditional Eastern European beverages called balsam.

Krasnaya Polyana Balsam is made with a combination of 24 herbs, 8 fruits, honey and other ingredients collected in the mountains area around the Black Sea. Among its natural ingredients are cherry plum and apple juices as well as morses of dried apricots, kiwi fruits and raisins. Its recipe was developed by the Russian Academy of Agricultural Sciences in the Scientific Research Institute of Food Biotechnology.

The balsam is commercially available for retail since 2003. Since then it was awarded many medals in various competitions of alcoholic beverages. The production facility offers tours which include a tasting session of Krasnaya Polyana Balsam and other similar alcohol drinks.

== Composition ==
Krasnaya Polyana Balsam includes 38 ingredients, among which 32 are medical plants, including 24 herbs and 8 fruit crops in the form of infusions, morses and flavored spirits.

- Infusions of:
  - Illicium,
  - Dianthus,
  - Angelica archangelica,
  - Galangal rhizome,
  - bark of Ceylon cinnamon,
  - fruits of coriander,
  - Almond,
  - Nutmeg,
  - Silybum marianum,
  - leaves of cherry,
  - Melilotus officinalis,
  - oak rhizome,
  - Oregano,
  - Hypericum,
  - Calendula officinalis,
  - Juniper berries,
  - Tanacetum,
  - Artemisia,
  - Matricaria,
  - Stevia,
  - Tea plants,
  - Thymus,
  - Vaccinium myrtillus;
- cherry plum and apple spirited juices;
- morses of:
  - dried apricots,
  - kiwi fruits,
  - raisins;
- balsam Peru oil;
- lemon, grapefruit and juniperus essential oils;
- honey;
- vanillin;
- rectified ethyl alcohol of the highest purification.

== See also ==
- List of liqueurs
