= Moskovskaya vodka =

Brand of Russian vodka

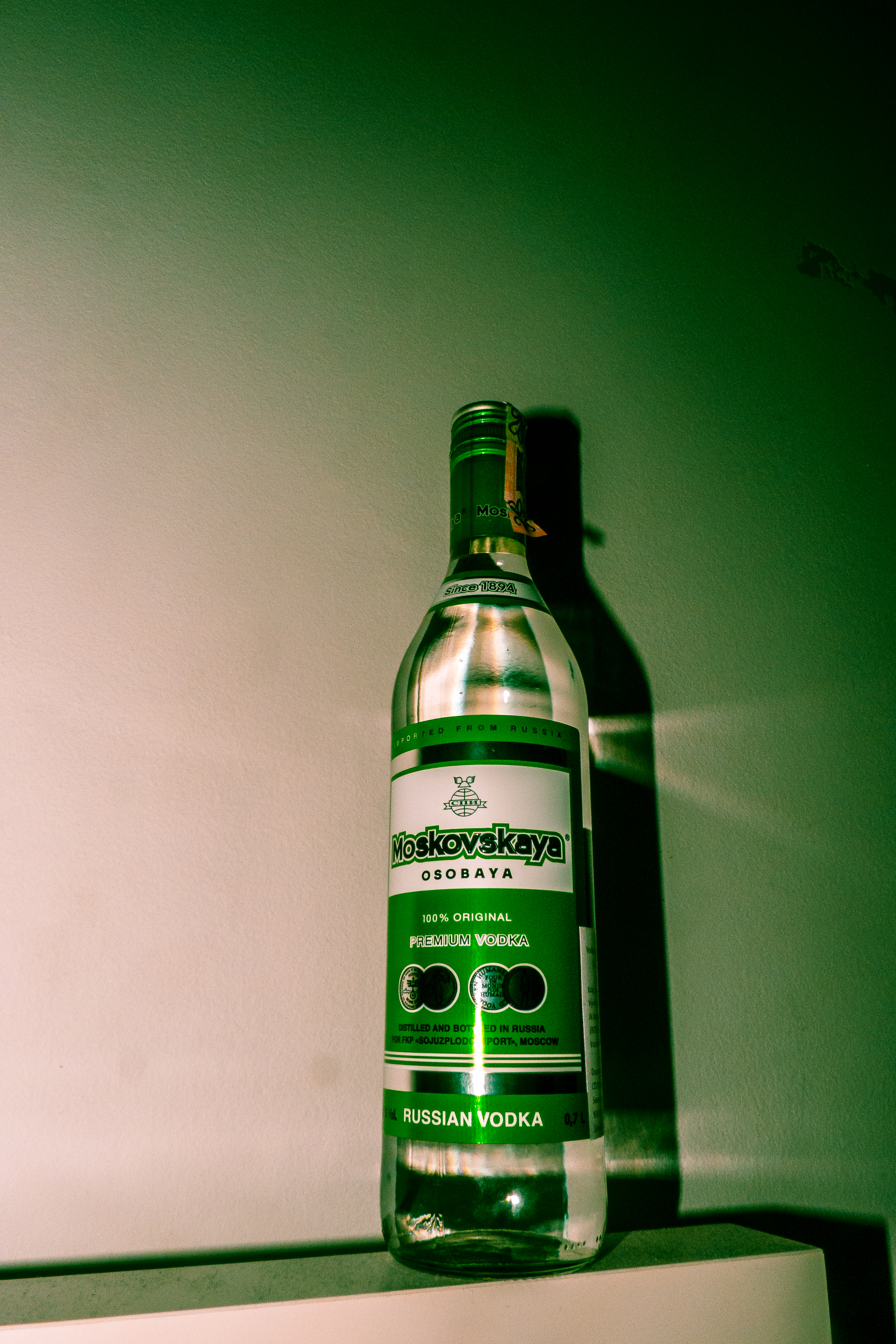
Moskovskaya vodka

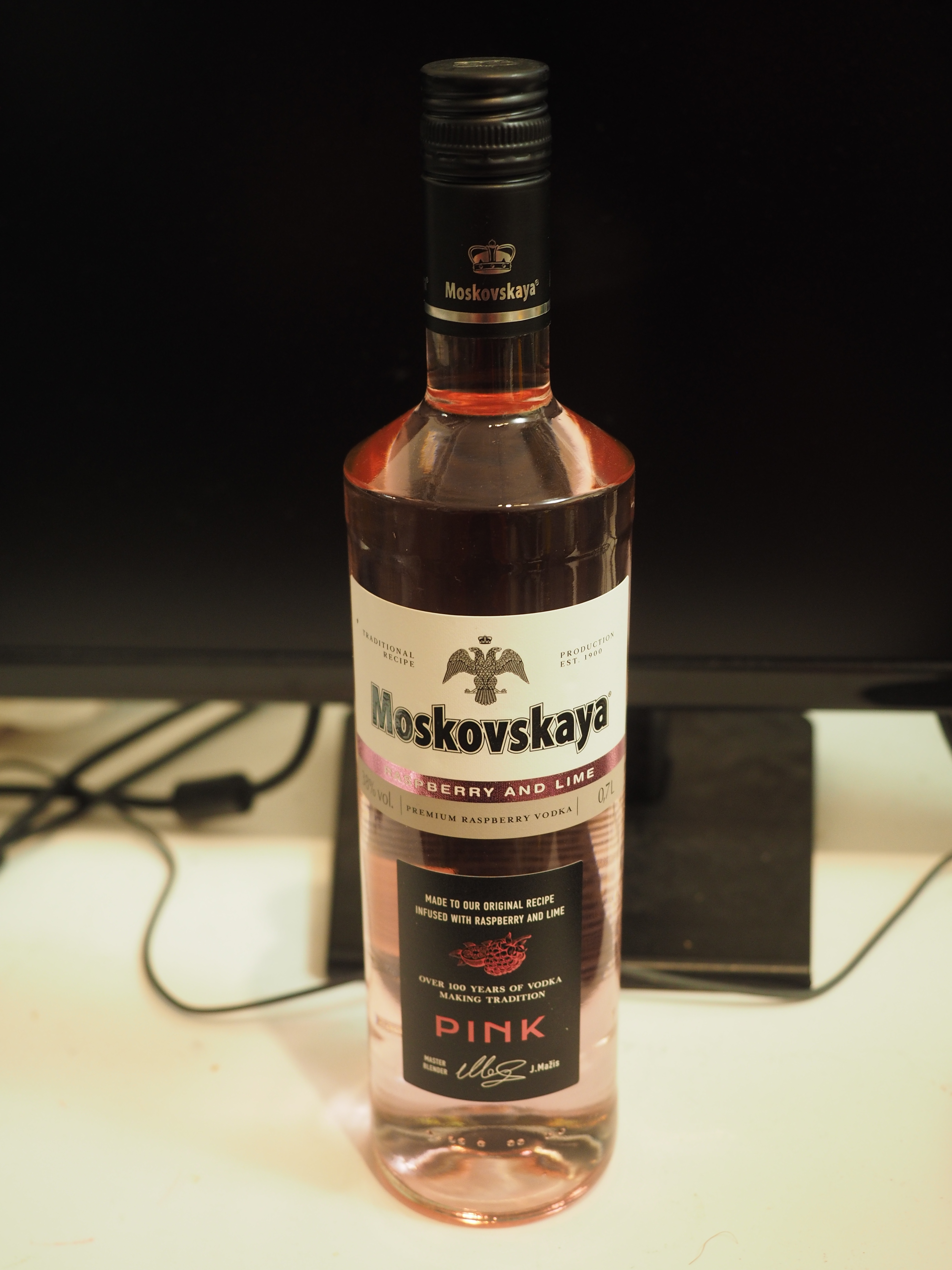
Latvian Moskovskaya Pink vodka flavoured with raspberry and lime

Moskovskaya special vodka (Russian: Московская особая водка; English: Moscow special vodka) or simply Moskovskaya vodka is an early Russian brand of vodka introduced in 1894 by the Russian state vodka monopoly. Its production was stopped (along with other strong spirits) with the introduction of the World War I prohibition in Russia. The brand was restored in 1925 in the Soviet Union.

Moskovskaya has been recognized by the green color of its label throughout its history.

Currently its trademark is held in Russia by Soyuzplodoimport and, along with a number of other Soviet legacy vodka brands has been a matter of various legal battles. In particular, it is contested by the SPI Group.

Moskovskaya is a brand recognized in Germany and some other countries and produced in Russia and in Latvia by the company SPI Group represented in Germany by Simex GmbH. Subbrands known in Germany include:

- Moskovskaya osobaya vodka
- Moskovskaya Cristall (after the Moscow Distillery Cristall)
- Moskovskaya Pertsovka (after Pertsovka, aromatized with pepper)
- Moskovskaya Zitrovka (with lemon)
- Moskovskaya Zubrovka (after Zubrovka)

== Awards ==
Awards include:

- 2008 — silver medal at the international tasting competition «Best vodka of the year»;
- 2014 — International, professional, food and Beverage tasting competition «Product of the Year — 2014» within the exhibition Worldfood Moscow — Grand Prix;
- 2015 — International Exhibition of Food Products and Raw Materials for their Production «Продэкспо — 2015» — Grand Prix of International Competition «Best Product 2015».
