= Tatiana Kovylina =

Russian model

- Born: November 4, 1981 (age 44); Kazan, Tatar ASSR, Soviet Union
- Other name: Tatiana
- Modeling information
- Height: 1.77 m (5 ft 9 1/2 in)
- Hair color: Brown
- Eye color: Green

Tatiana Kovylina (Russian: Татьяна Ковылина; born 4 November 1981) is a Russian model. She has appeared in advertisements for Ann Taylor, Calvin Klein Jeans, Cole Haan, and in 2002, she was on the cover of Madame Figaro. In 2005, she walked the runway for Victoria's Secret, which she returned to in 2009.

In 2016, Kovylina co-founded Silou London, a London-based activewear brand.

She has four children with her former husband Yuri Shefler, a Soviet-born British and Israeli billionaire businessman.
