= Balsam (drink) =

Eastern European herbal liqueur

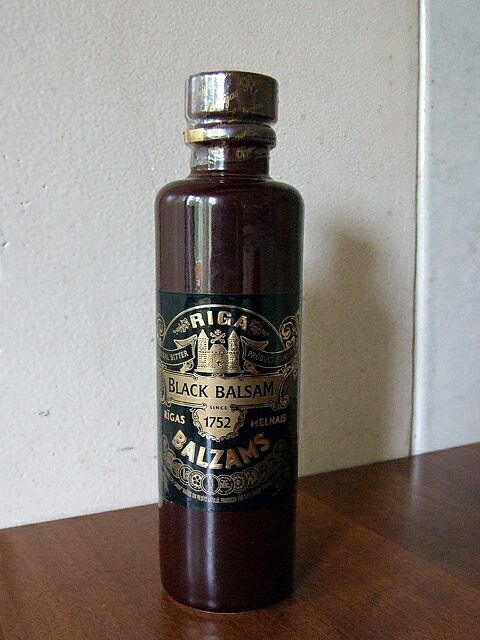
Riga Black Balsam

Balsam is a variety of traditional Eastern and Northeastern European herbal, high alcohol content (40–45%) liqueurs originally used for medicinal purposes.

== Examples ==
- Riga Black Balsam
- Ukrainian Balsam
- Krasnaya Polyana Balsam
- Karelian Balsam

== See also ==
- Bitters – Alcoholic preparation flavored with botanical matter
- Flavored liquor – Alcoholic beverage with added flavoring and, in most cases, added sugar
- Apéritif and digestif – Alcoholic drink normally served before or after a meal
- Balsam – Resinous exudate which forms on certain kinds of trees and shrubs
