= Latvijas Balzams =

Company based in Riga, Latvia

Amber Latvijas Balzams AS
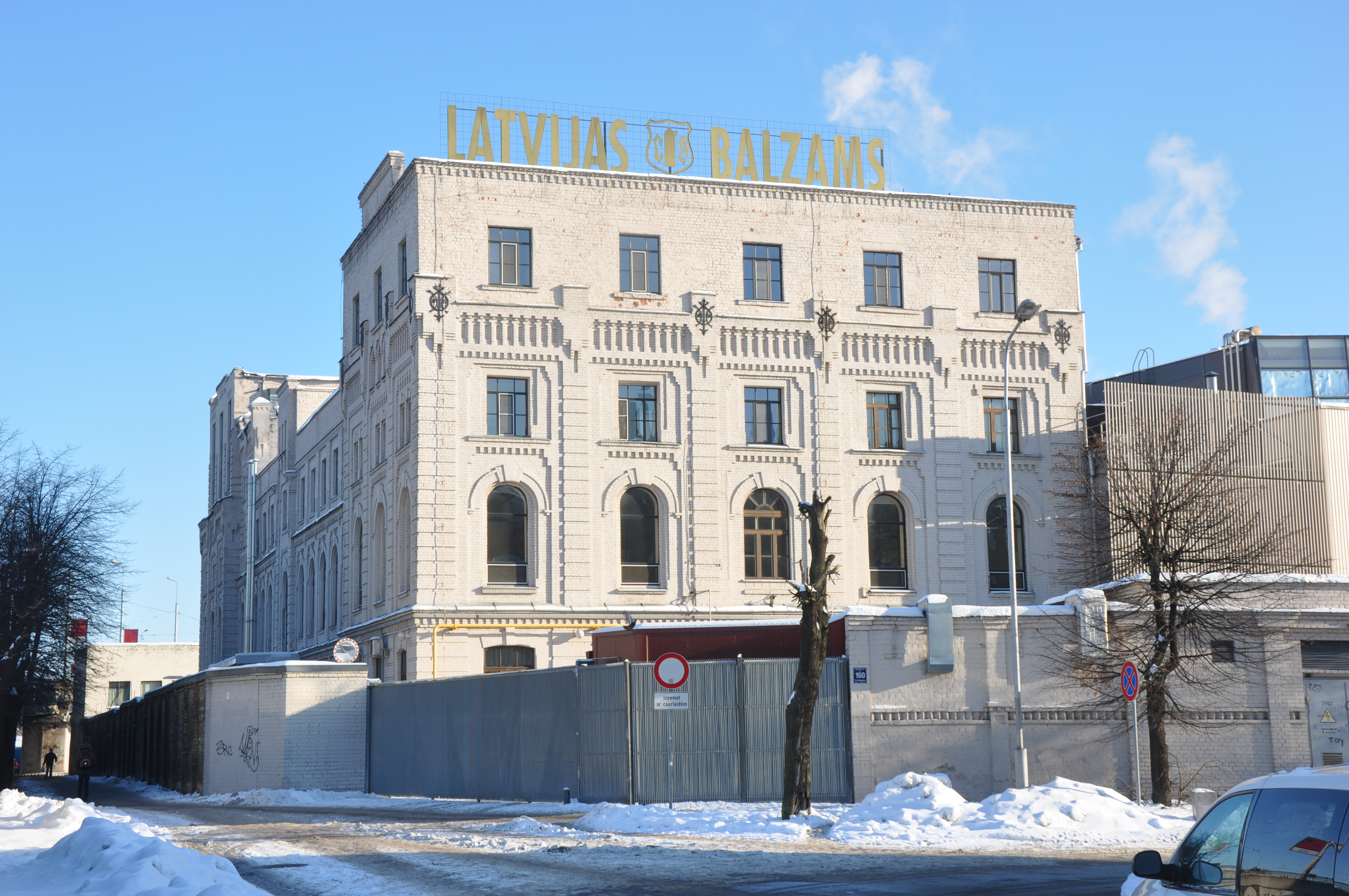
- Latvijas Balzams production buildings at Aleksandra Čaka Street 170, Riga
- Company type: Joint stock company
- Traded as: Nasdaq Baltic: BAL1R
- Industry: Alcoholic beverages
- Founded: 1997
- Headquarters: Riga, Latvia
- Key people: Aigars Kalvītis (Chairman); Guntis Āboltiņš-Āboliņš (General Director)
- Revenue: 47,365,207 LVL (2012); 46,913,835 LVL (2011)
- Operating income: ▲5,009,383 LVL (2012); 4,436,369 LVL (2011)
- Net income: ▲4,193,003 LVL (2012); 3,651,862 LVL (2011)
- Total assets: ▲87,429,625 LVL (2012); 84,335,748 LVL (2011)
- Total equity: ▲50,879,628 LVL (2012); 46,638,090 LVL (2011)
- Owner: Amber Beverage Group Holding S.à r.l. (89.99%)
- Number of employees: 613 (2012); 613 (2011)
- Website: balzams.lv/en/

Amber Latvijas Balzams (English: Latvian Balsam) is the largest alcoholic beverage producer in the Baltic states headquartered in Riga. As of 2006, it had a market share of about 50% in Latvia. The company has a long history as the beginning of it can be considered 1900 when Riga State Vodka Warehouse No.1 started operation as it later changed its name to Latvijas balzams in 1970 and eventually became a public joint stock company in 1997. Its flagship product is Riga Black Balsam which is a traditional Latvian herbal liqueur.
