= Riga Black Balsam =

Traditional Latvian herbal liqueur

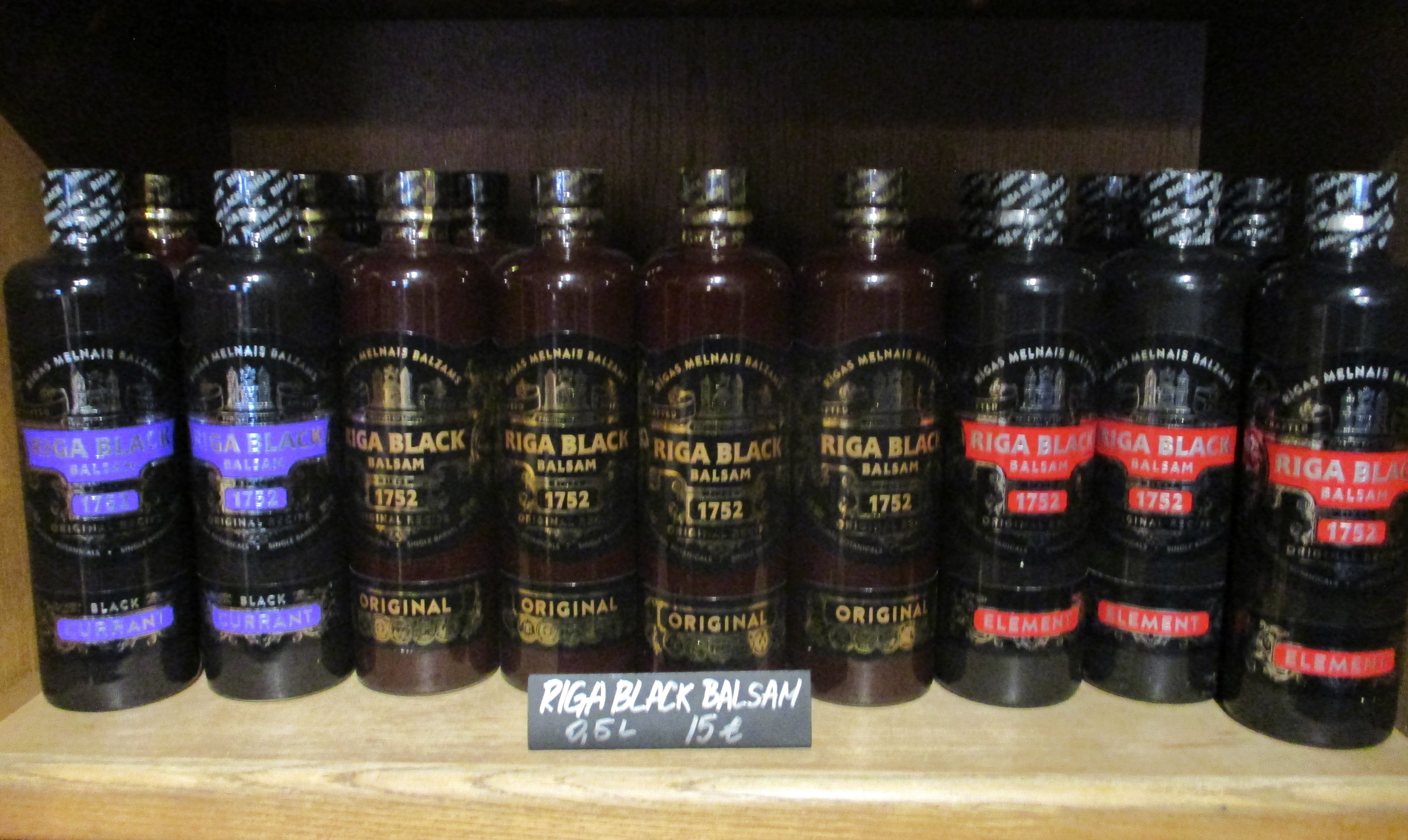
- Half-litre bottles of Riga Black Balsam: Blackcurrant, Original, and Element (with rum)
- Type: Liqueur
- Manufacturer: Latvijas Balzams
- Origin: Latvia
- Introduced: 1752
- Alcohol by volume: 45% (classic), 43% (XO), 40% (Coffee), 30% (Black Currant and Cherry)
- Proof (US): 60°–90°
- Colour: Dark brown (classic), dark purple (Black Currant), or dark red (Cherry)
- Flavour: A combination of birch, lime, ginger, cocoa, liquorice baking spices, and berries
- Website: rigablack.com

Riga Black Balsam (Latvian: Rīgas Melnais balzams) is a traditional Latvian balsam often considered to be the national drink of Latvia. According to tradition, only the Head Liquor Master and two of his apprentices know the exact recipe. Nowadays, Riga Black Balsam is produced by JSC Latvijas Balzams and has received more than 100 awards at different international fairs throughout its history.

More than 2 million bottles of Riga Black Balsam are produced each year and exported to 30 countries. There are several variations of the balsam with blackcurrants, cherries, and even brandy.

== History ==
=== During Abraham Kunze's lifetime ===
The traditional recipe was created in 1752 by Abraham Kunze, an apothecary living in Riga. In 1762, Kunze published an advertisement for the balsam in the December 23rd issue of the Rigische Anzeigen newspaper, describing its purported healing properties and instructions for use and offering it in flasks, cruses and bottles of an unspecified volume sealed with wax with his initials (A.K.) pressed in them for a price of two state thalers for a shtof.

According to a legend, Empress Catherine the Great was heading back to Russia and stopped in Riga for a few days' respite. Shortly after arriving, she fell very ill, and Kunze was asked to step in after the empress's personal doctor proved helpless. The balsam's success in curing Catherine the Great gave it popularity throughout Europe and gave Kunze exclusive rights to produce it for the next 50 years.

=== After Kunze's death ===
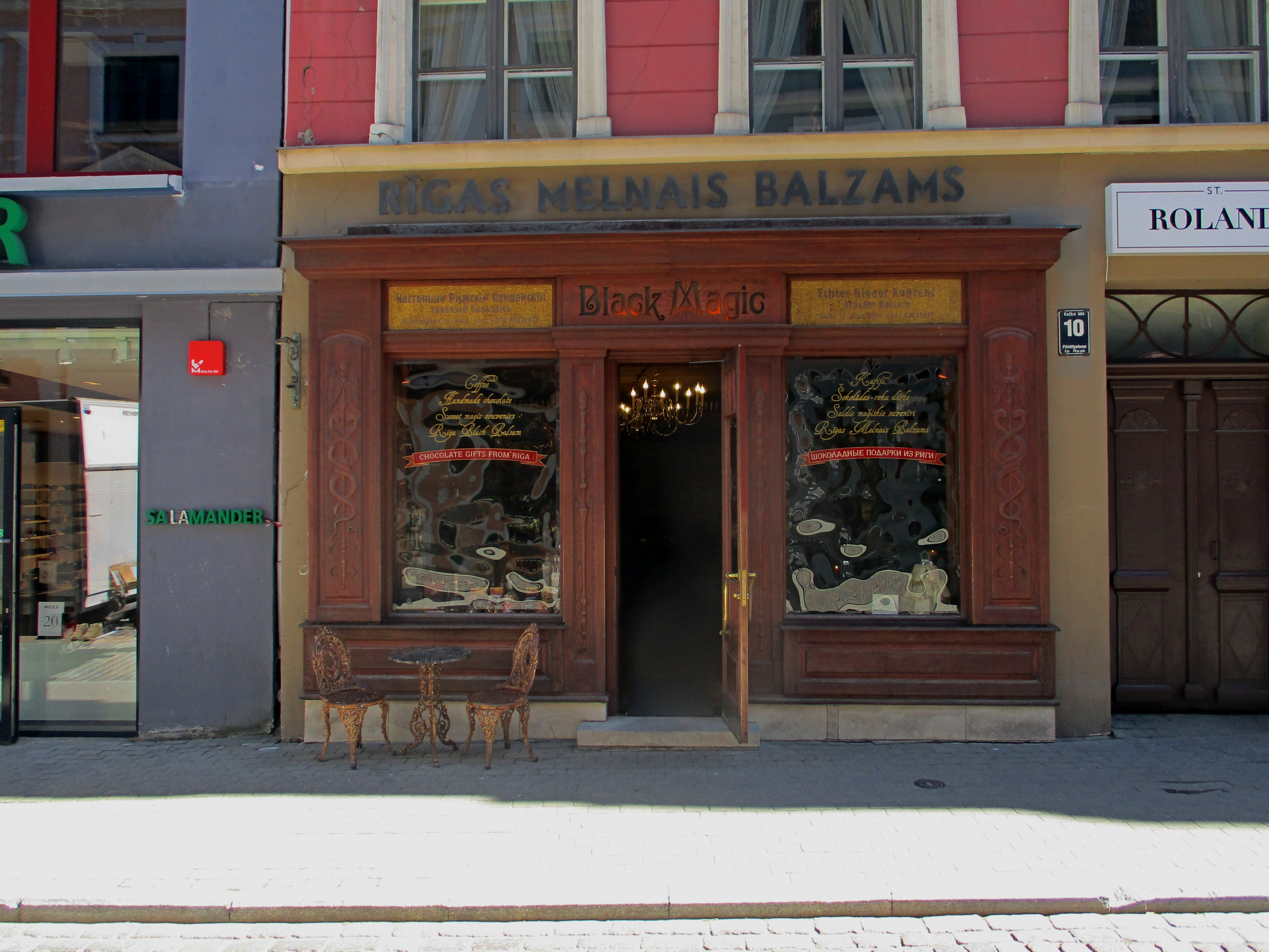
Black Magic Bar in an 18th-century pharmacy on Kaļķu street in Old Riga

After the death of Abraham Kunze, his widowed wife Eva Sofia Kunze continued to produce and sell the balsam as Kunzensky balsam (Russian: Кунценский бальзам, German: Kunzer Balsam, Latvian: Kuncena balzams), while the ownership and inheritance of rights to the balsam came under increasing dispute. In 1766, a glazier from Riga, Peteris Adams, claimed to be the actual inventor of the balsam, having supposedly invented it ten years before Kunze, who was accused of taking his formula; however, Riga City Council rejected Adams' application, arguing that he had come forth with the allegations only after Abraham Kunze's death. In 1770 and 1774, Eva Kunze complained to the Governor-General of Riga about the counterfeit production of Kunze's balsam and requested that others be prohibited from producing it, but her request was denied.

In 1774, "to increase the health of society," Riga authorities granted the production rights to Kuzensky Balsam to carpenter Martin Roslau, who "had had the opportunity to learn the composition of the said balsam from Abraham Kunze." Martin Roslau produced it until his death in 1783, after which it was continued by his only daughter Maria Jadwiga and a year later also by her new husband Cristop Strizky.

=== Transformation into a drink for general consumption ===
In 1789, Semyon Leluchin, a merchant from Vyazma, Russia, obtained a patent for the balsam's production and sales. It is unknown when or how he acquired the recipe, but Leluchin transformed Kunze's 16 ABV white-coloured medicinal drink into a stronger black balsam intended for general consumption. As a result, sales of the balsam rose sharply, and in some cities of the Russian Empire it began to be consumed as a strong vodka. In 1804, the factory of Yegor Leluchin, the son and heir of Semyon Leluchin, employed six workers and one apprentice, producing 9,200 shtofs of the balsam, of which 4,200 were sold abroad, while the remaining 5,000 were stored for the next year.

In the 19th century, Riga Black Balsam became a national drink and, by the mid-19th century, was already produced by factories in Riga, Liepāja, Bauska, Talsi, and Ventspils. In either 1845 or 1847, Wolfschmidt, the biggest and best-known producer of Riga Black Balsam in the 19th century, began its operations. It continued producing Riga Black Balsam even after Latvia declared its independence in 1918.

=== The loss and restoration of the recipe ===
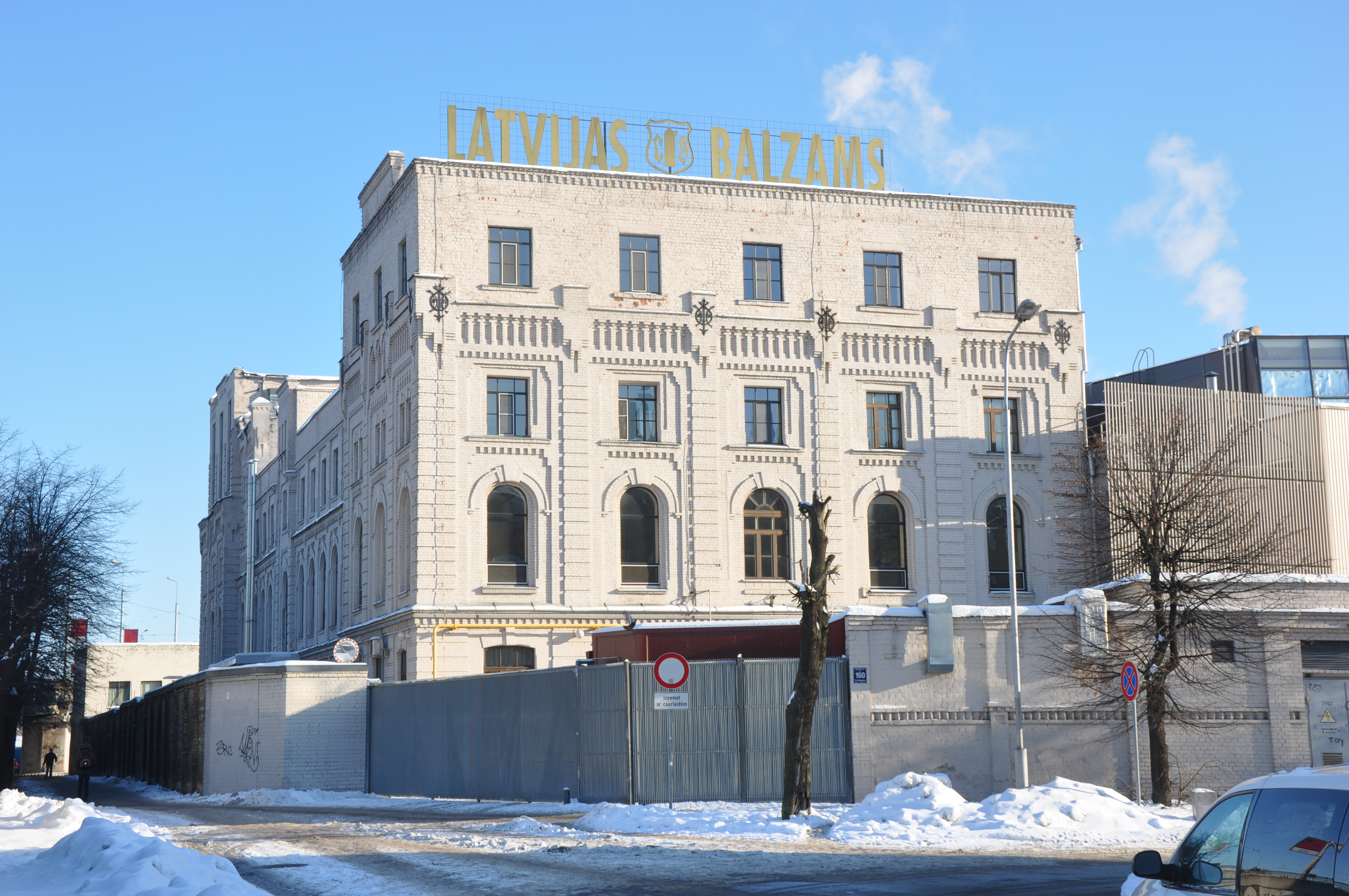
Riga Black Balsam manufacturing plant in 160 Aleksandra Čaka street

The original recipe was lost in 1939 after its last keepers, the Schrader brothers, repatriated to Germany. The recipe was carefully restored in 1950 through a collective effort of the factory's employees, with the technologist Maiga Podračniece playing an essential role in the restoration, for which she was awarded the Order of the Red Banner of Labour. In 1969, a joint team of specialists from Latvijas Keramika and Riga Polytechnical Institute designed the very first ceramic bottles for the balsam.

During the Latvian SSR, there was a deficit of Riga Black Balsam, which became a valuable souvenir and gift that was sometimes even regifted. In the 1970s, a 300-gram bottle of the 45-proof Riga Black Balsam with an iron stopper cost 9 Rbls 10 kop "inclusive of the cost of the container", while a similar bottle with a cork stopper sealed with wax cost 10 Rbls 90 kop.

=== Modern variations of the Riga Black Balsam ===
In 2019, a new version of Riga Black Balsam was released mixing the original balsam extract with Arabica coffee bean and cinnamon extract. 2020 saw the launch of two limited edition versions – Riga Black Balsam XO blended with an 8 year old French brandy, and Riga Black Balsam Chocolate & Mint.

== In Denmark ==
The Riga Black Balsam was first introduced in Denmark at the end of the 18th century by merchant ships from Marstal trading with Riga. From there, it spread to Danish sailors and the medicine chests of Danish ships throughout the country, remaining an essential component of the medicine chests for the Royal Greenland Trading Department ships until the early 1920s. Nowadays, the Riga Black Balsam is still sold in stores and pubs in Marstal, where it is traditionally consumed with akvavit. 10–12 drops of the Riga Black Balsam (locally known simply as "a Riga") are topped off with akvavit in a shot glass to produce a drink locally known as "a Marstaller".

== Production ==
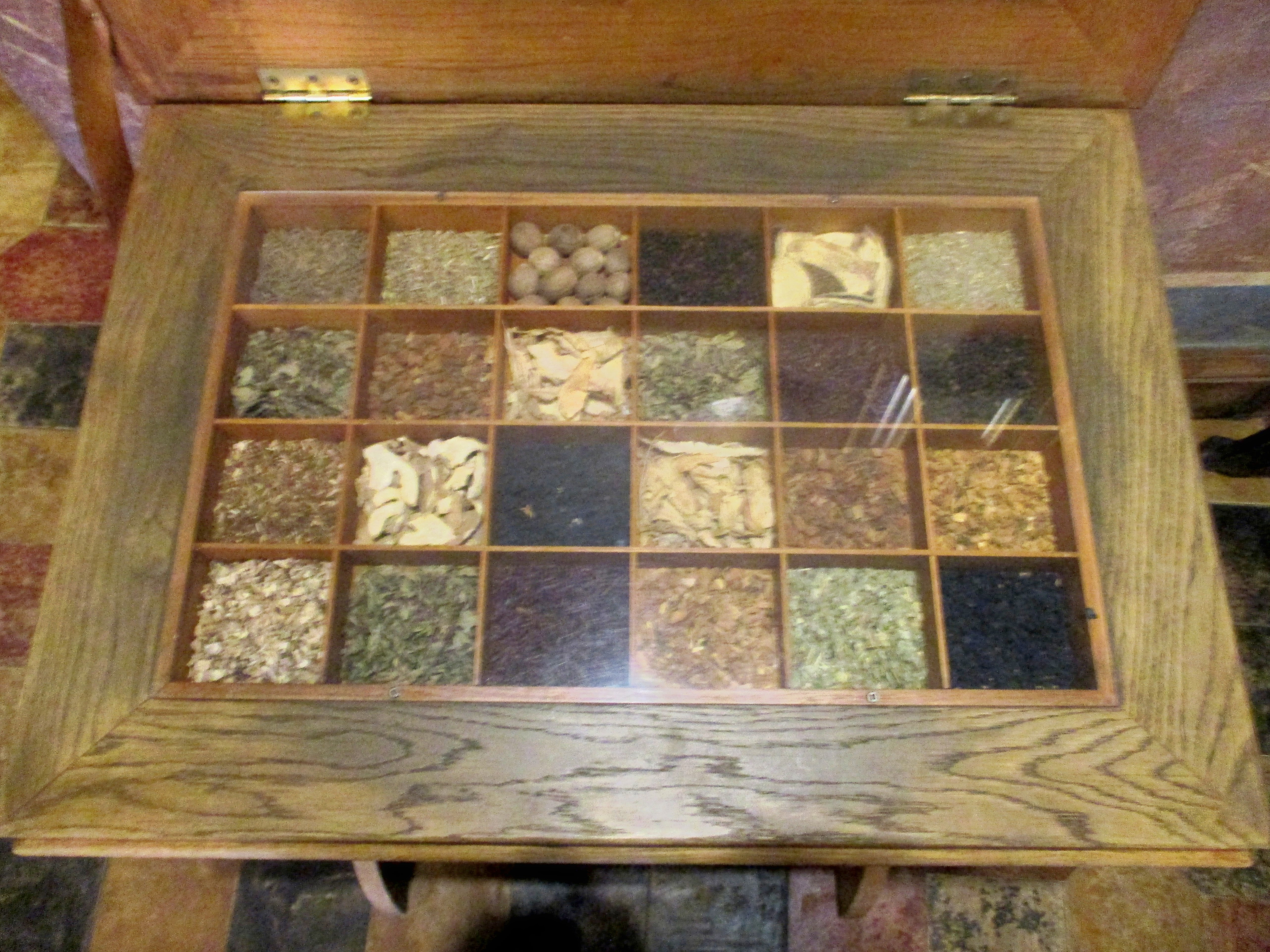
The 24 ingredients of the Riga Black Balsam

Originally, Kunze's balsam consisted of a mixture of aromatic water (75%) and a tincture of sage, dill seeds, peppermint leaves, lavender flowers, rosemary and cinnamon.

The modern Riga Black Balsam consists of 24 natural ingredients, including 17 botanicals – bilberries/blueberries, raspberries, birch buds, bitterwort root, peppermint leaves, Artemisia absinthium stalks and leaves, ginger root, Valerian root, sweet flag root, Melissa officinalis leaves and stems, Tilia cordata blossom, oak bark, St John's wort, buckbean leaves, black pepper, Citrus aurantium skins and nutmeg.

A 45 ABV solution is infused with the botanicals and aged for 30 days in oak barrels to create the Riga Black Balsam essence, which is then blended with honey, caramel, natural juices and other ingredients, and filled in clay bottles.

== Flavour and use ==
The colour of the classic Riga Black Balsam is likened to black coffee. Its aroma is described as ranging from acetone to liquorice to chocolate and the flavour is characterised as a combination of birch, lime, ginger, cocoa, liquorice baking spices and berries. The intensity of Riga Black Balsam's bitterness has been rated 4 out of 5, the intensity of the sweetness 3 out of 5 and the intensity of the aroma 4 out of 5.

Riga Black Balsam is had on its own or added to coffee, hot chocolate, desserts, syrups, chocolate ganache, or traditionally over ice cream. It is also poured over juices to create the so-called Black Shooter (the most popular being with peach), as well as used as an ingredient in various cocktails, such as the "Black and Stormy", where Black Balsam is mixed with vodka, lime juice, ginger beer, and sugar syrup. Black Balsam Black Currant, on the other hand, is used in cocktails such as "Stairway to Heaven", whereas Black Balsam Cherry is added to Cherry Soda. Nowadays, the Riga Black Balsam is also used in traditional medicine as a cold remedy and to treat digestive problems.

A 1775 newspaper advertisement for the balsam listed its numerous purported internal and external uses at the time: healing gunshot, puncture and stab wounds by stopping bleeding, relieving pain and preventing infection, relieving and healing burns, frostbites, sprains, and erysipelas (red and white), treating swelling, tooth-, and headaches, stopping colic and labour pain, reducing menstruation bleeding, treating severe chills, painlessly healing rabid dog and poisonous reptile bites, preventing oozing from psoriasis, alleviating pain, preventing inflammation and fever from fractures, curing scurvy and ulcerative stomatitis and safeguarding against infection and contagious diseases by strengthening the heart and boosting vitality.

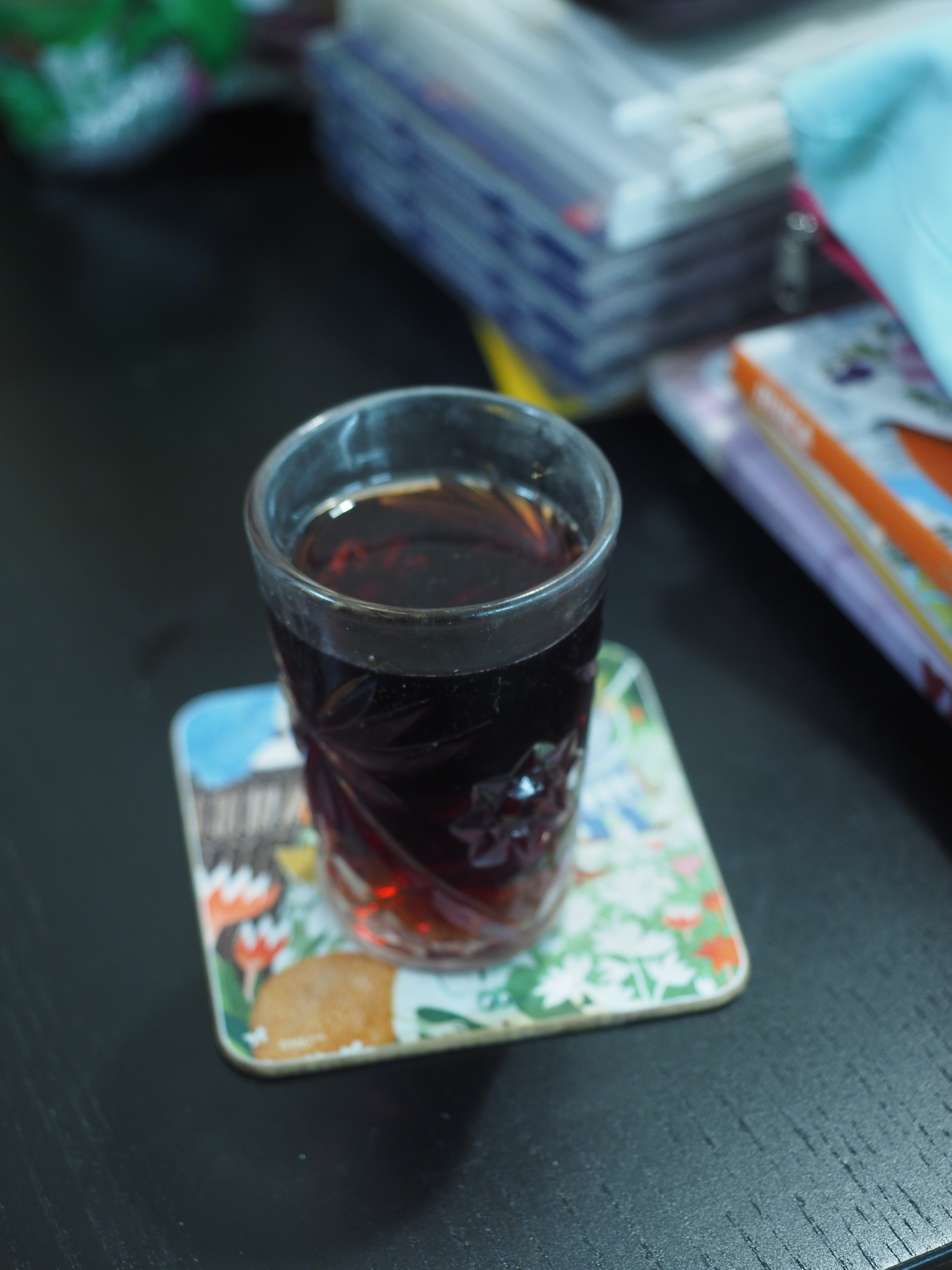
A shot of Riga Black Balsam

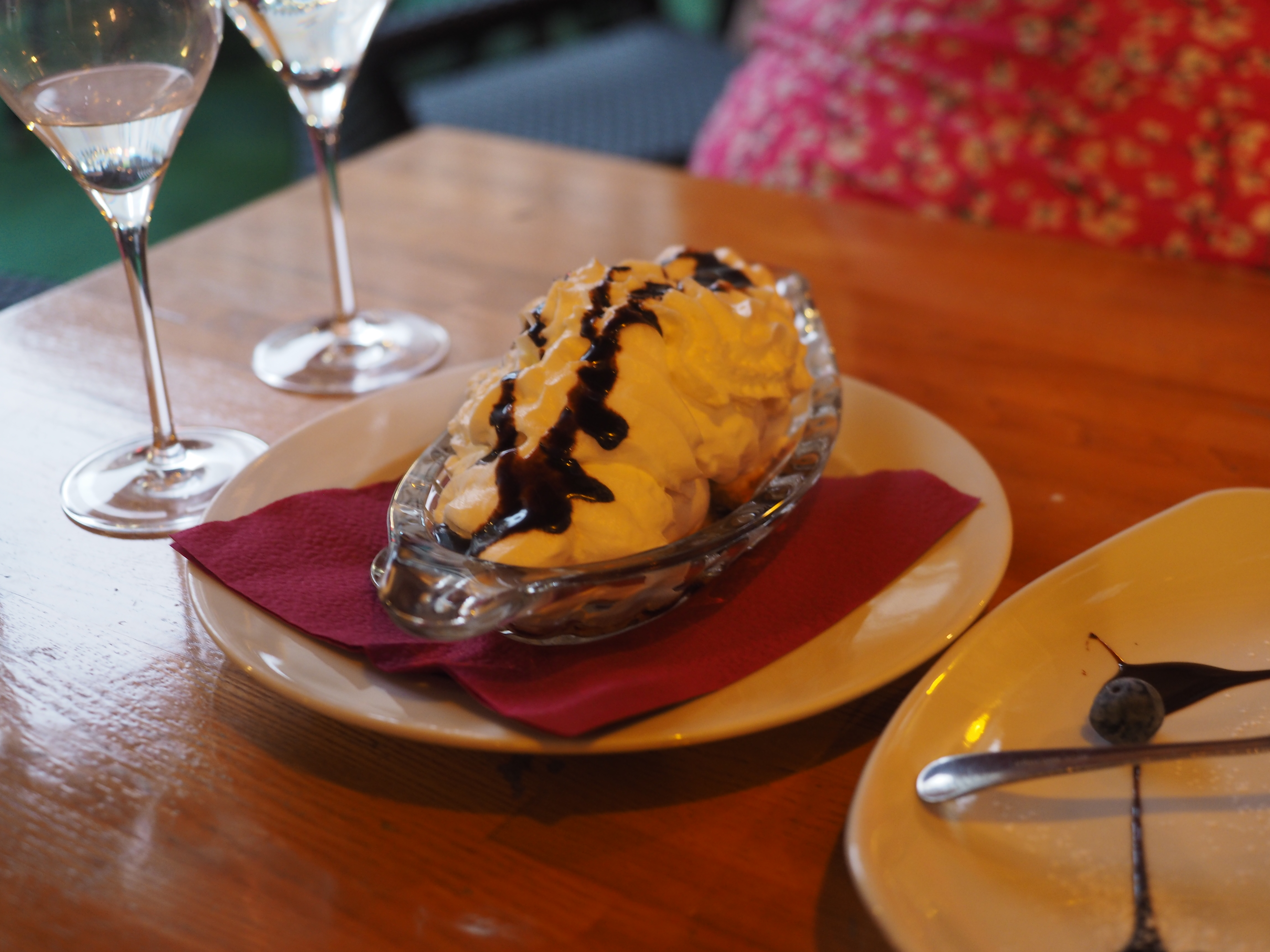
Riga Black Balsam over vanilla ice cream

== See also ==
- Allasch Kümmel

== Bibliography ==
- Sļičkovs, Aleksandrs; Ņikišins, Aleksandrs (2017). Journey to the land of Black balsam. Uzbek Palace. ISBN 978-9-934-86571-8.
