= Gin =

Distilled alcoholic drink flavoured with juniper

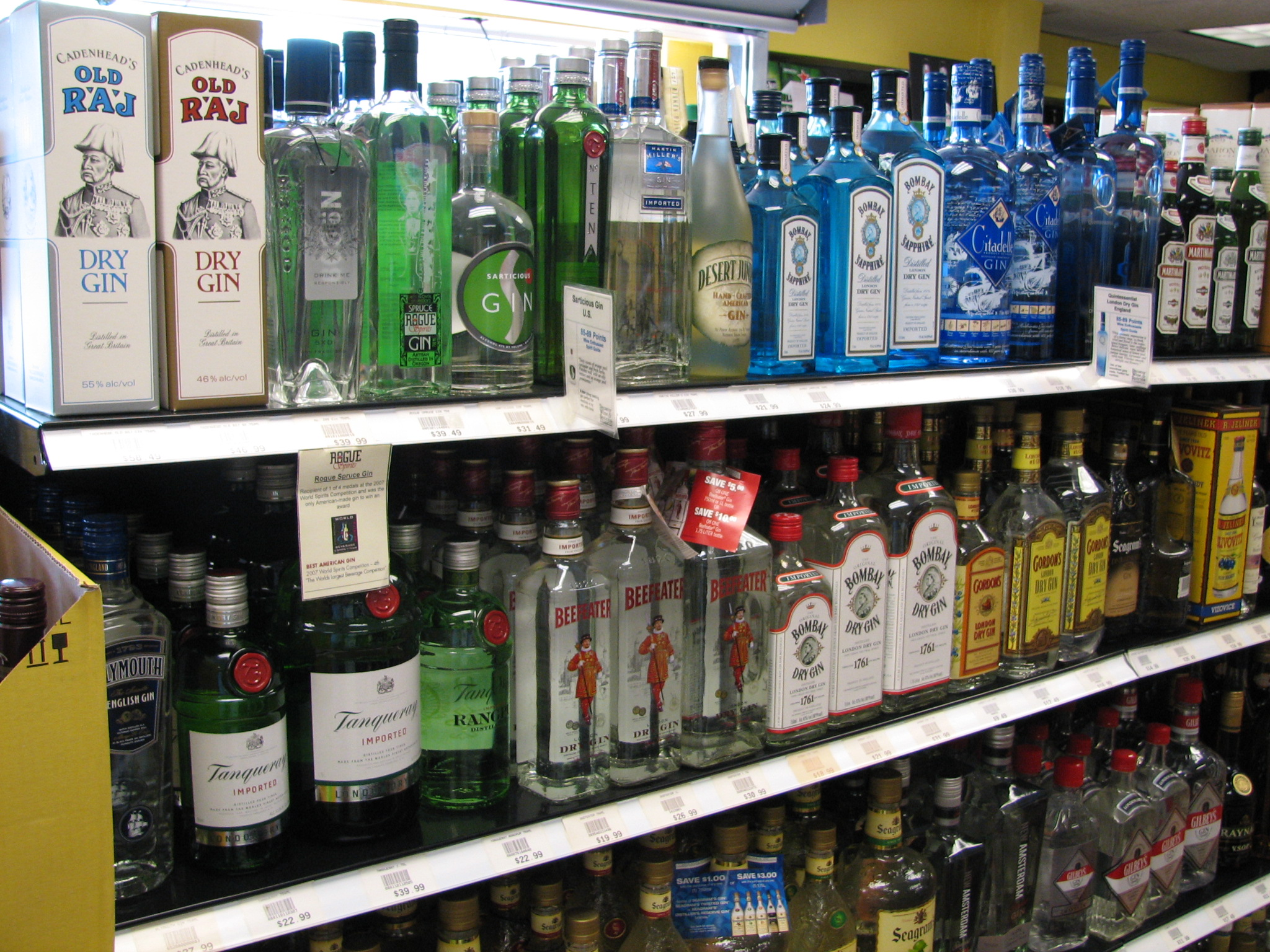
- A selection of bottled gins for sale in Georgia, United States, 2010
- Type: Distilled alcoholic drink
- Origin: England; Netherlands
- Introduced: 12th century
- Alcohol by volume: 35–60%
- Proof (US): 70–140°
- Colour: Clear
- Ingredients: Barley or other grain, juniper berries
- Related products: Jenever

Gin (/dʒɪn/) is a distilled alcoholic drink flavoured with juniper berries and other botanical ingredients. It originated as a medicinal liquor made by monks and alchemists in the 12th Century in Salerno, Italy. The modern gin was modified in Flanders and the Netherlands to provide aqua vita from distillates of grapes and grains, becoming an object of commerce in the spirits industry. Gin became popular in England after the introduction of jenever, a Dutch and Belgian liquor. Although this development had been taking place since the early 17th century, gin became widespread after the 1688 Glorious Revolution led by William of Orange and subsequent import restrictions on French brandy. Gin emerged as England's national alcoholic drink during the Gin Craze of 1695–1735.

Gin is produced from a wide range of herbal ingredients in many distinct styles and brands. After juniper, gin is often flavoured with herbs, spices, floral or fruit flavours, or a combination. It is commonly mixed with tonic water in a gin and tonic. Gin is also used as a base spirit to produce flavoured, gin-based liqueurs, such as sloe gin, traditionally made by adding fruit, flavourings, and sugar.

== Etymology ==
Medicinal precursor (Salerno, Italy, ~11th–12th century). The first traces of wine distillates infused with herbs date back to the 12th century in Italy, referenced in the Compendium Salernitanum of the Schola Medica Salernitana — a medical school in Salerno founded in the 9th century, influenced by Arabic and Greek medical practice, and an important source of medical knowledge in Western Europe between the 10th and 13th centuries. A recipe compiled around 1055 under that name includes a juniper-infused tonic wine, made by Benedictine monks using distilling knowledge that had moved into Europe via the Moors' rule of Sicily. This was medicine, not a recreational spirit.

Genever is the direct ancestor (Low Countries, 13th–16th century). Belgium's National Jenever Museum in Hasselt credits Flanders with creating jenever in the 13th century.

The first recorded mention of genever as a distilled beverage flavoured with juniper appears in the 16th century, in Philippus Hermanni's Antwerp-published Een Constelijck Distileerboec. By the mid-17th century, numerous small Dutch and Flemish distillers were popularizing the redistillation of malt wine with juniper and other botanicals to mask poor taste and treat ailments like kidney and stomach complaints.

Anglicisation (England, late 17th century onward). Gin's popularity in England surged after William of Orange took the British throne in 1689, when taxes on domestically distilled spirits dropped, and heavy duties hit imports like French brandy—a political move against France, not a quality judgment. Some historians (Sipsmith's Jared Brown and Anistatia Miller) argue this displaces an earlier English gin tradition: a 1639 manuscript, The Distiller of London, contains a juniper/orange peel/lemon peel/orris root recipe — the template for London Dry Gin — predating Dutch genever's arrival in Britain by roughly fifty years.

Thus, the name gin is a shortened form of the older English word genever, related to the French word genièvre and the Dutch word jenever. All ultimately derive from juniperus, the Latin for juniper.

== History ==
=== Origin: 12th-century mentions ===
Gin's origins predate its association with Britain and the Netherlands by several centuries. The earliest traces of wine distillates infused with herbs date to 12th-century Italy, documented in the Compendium Salernitanum of the Schola Medica Salernitana. The Schola Medica Salernitana, based in Salerno and founded in the 9th century, drew on Arabic and Greek medical traditions and was a leading centre of medical knowledge in Western Europe between the 10th and 13th centuries. Benedictine monks in Salerno are thought to have used distilling knowledge acquired via Arab sources, transmitted through the Moorish rule of Sicily, to produce alcohol used to dissolve and preserve medicinal plants, including juniper, which grew abundantly in the surrounding hills. A collection of remedies compiled around 1055, known as the Compendium Salernitanum, includes a recipe for a juniper-infused tonic wine. This predates the Dutch genever tradition, which only enters the written record later: the first recorded mention of genever as a distilled, juniper-flavoured beverage appears in the 16th century, in Philippus Hermanni's Antwerp-published Een Constelijck Distileerboec. The Salerno tonic and Dutch genever are distinct developments in the same lineage — the former a medicinal precursor, the latter the direct ancestor of the beverage now defined as gin — and crediting Holland alone as gin's "origin" omits roughly five centuries of documented prior history.

Grapes & Grains ("The History of Gin," grapesandgrains.org); Diffords Guide ("History of Gin: 1100s–mid-1500s," diffordsguide.com); Grapes & Grains again for the genever/Hermanni reference.

=== 17th century ===
The physician Franciscus Sylvius has been falsely credited with the invention of gin in the mid-17th century, as the existence of jenever is confirmed in Philip Massinger's play The Duke of Milan (1623), when Sylvius would have been about nine years old. Also, the Dutch States' ordinance on brandy already levied taxes on distilled anise, gin, or fennel water sold as alcoholic drinks in 1606, eight years before Sylvius was born. It is further claimed that English soldiers who provided support in Antwerp against the Spanish in 1585, during the Eighty Years' War, were already drinking jenever for its calming effects before battle, from which the term Dutch courage is believed to have originated.

By the mid-17th century, numerous small Dutch and Flemish distillers had popularized the re-distillation of malted barley spirit or malt wine with juniper, as well as anise, caraway, coriander, etc., which were sold in pharmacies and used to treat such medical problems as kidney ailments, lumbago, stomach ailments, gallstones, and gout. Gin emerged in England in various forms by the early 17th century and, during the Stuart Restoration, enjoyed a brief resurgence. Gin became vastly more popular as an alternative to brandy, when William III and Mary II became co-sovereigns of England, Scotland and Ireland after leading the Glorious Revolution. Particularly in crude, inferior forms, it was more likely to be flavoured with turpentine. Historian Angela McShane has described it as a "Protestant drink" as its rise was brought about by a Protestant king, fuelling his armies fighting the Catholic Irish and French.

=== 18th century ===
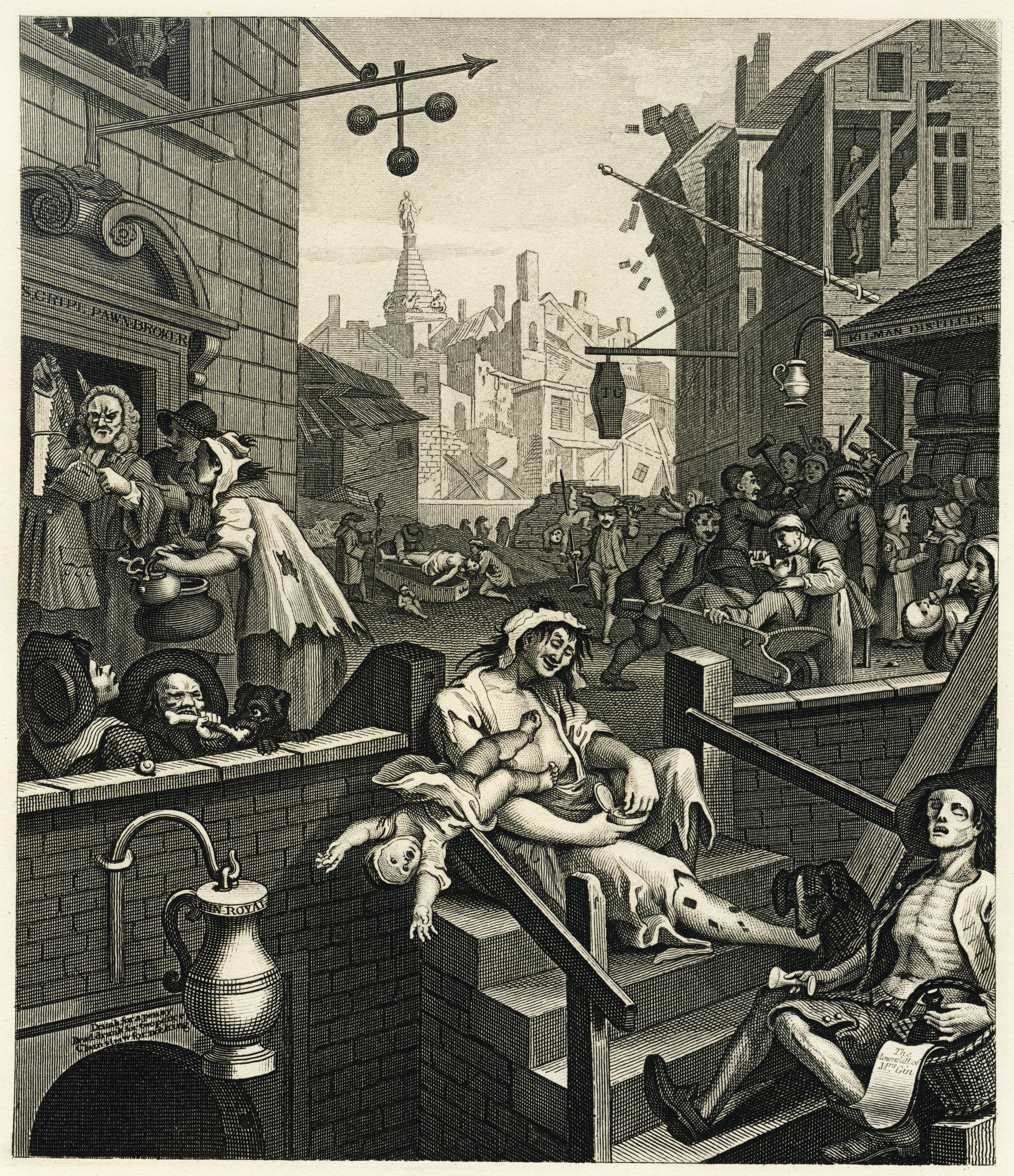
Hogarth's Gin Lane (created 1750–1751)

Gin drinking in England rose significantly after the government allowed unlicensed gin production and imposed a heavy duty on all imported spirits, such as French brandy. This created a larger market for poor-quality barley that was unfit for brewing beer, and in 1695–1735 thousands of gin shops sprang up throughout England, a period known as the Gin Craze. Because of the low price of gin compared with other drinks available at the time and in the same location, gin began to be consumed regularly by the poor. Of the 15,000 drinking establishments in London, not including coffee shops and drinking chocolate shops, over half were gin shops. Beer maintained a healthy reputation as it was often safer to drink the brewed ale than unclean plain water. Gin, though, was blamed for various social problems, and it may have been a factor in the higher death rates which stabilized London's previously growing population. The reputation of the two drinks was illustrated by William Hogarth in his engravings Beer Street and Gin Lane (1751), described by the BBC as "arguably the most potent anti-drug poster ever conceived". The negative reputation of gin survives in the English language in terms like gin mills or the American phrase gin joints to describe disreputable bars, or gin-soaked to refer to drunks. The epithet mother's ruin is a common British name for gin, though its origin is debated.

The Gin Act 1736 imposed high taxes on retailers and led to riots in the streets. The prohibitive duty was gradually reduced and finally abolished in 1742. The Gin Act 1751 was more successful, but it forced distillers to sell only to licensed retailers and brought gin shops under the jurisdiction of local magistrates. Gin in the 18th century was produced in pot stills, and thus had a maltier profile than modern London gin.

In London in the early 18th century, much gin was distilled legally in residential houses (there were an estimated 1,500 residential stills in 1726) and was often flavoured with turpentine to produce resinous, woody notes in addition to juniper. As late as 1913, Webster's Dictionary states without further comment, "'common gin' is usually flavoured with turpentine".

Another common variation was to distill in the presence of sulphuric acid. Although the acid itself does not distill, it imparts the additional aroma of diethyl ether to the resulting gin. Sulphuric acid removes one water molecule from two ethanol molecules to create diethyl ether, which also forms an azeotrope with ethanol and therefore distills with it. The result is a sweeter spirit, and one that may have possessed additional analgesic or even intoxicating effects.

Dutch or Belgian gin, also known as jenever or genever, evolved from malt wine spirits and is distinctly different from later styles of gin. Schiedam, a city in the province of South Holland, is famous for its jenever-producing history. The same is true for Hasselt in the Belgian province of Limburg. The oude (old) style of jenever remained popular throughout the 19th century, when it was referred to as Holland or Geneva gin in popular American pre-Prohibition bartender guides.

The 18th century gave rise to a style of gin referred to as Old Tom gin, a softer, sweeter style often containing sugar. Old Tom gin faded in popularity by the early 20th century.

=== 19th–20th centuries ===
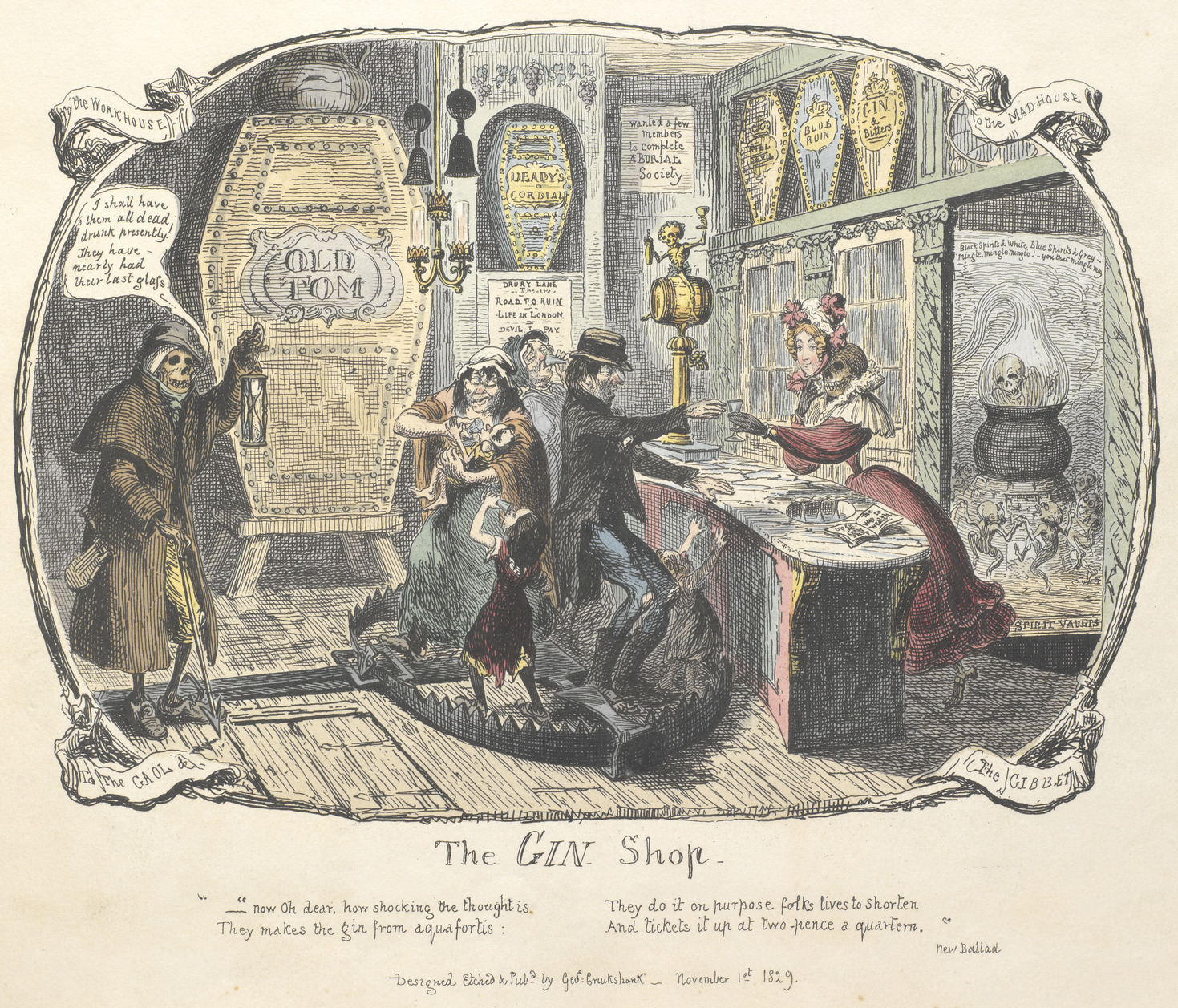
George Cruikshank's engraving of The Gin Shop (1829)

The invention and development of the column still (1826 and 1831) made the distillation of neutral spirits practical, thus enabling the creation of the "London dry" style that evolved later in the 19th century.

In tropical British colonies, gin was used to mask the bitter flavour of quinine, the only effective anti-malarial compound. Quinine was dissolved in carbonated water to form tonic water; the resulting cocktail is gin and tonic, although modern tonic water contains only trace amounts of quinine for flavour. Gin is a common base spirit for many mixed drinks, including the martini. Secretly produced "bathtub gin" was available in the speakeasies and "blind pigs" of Prohibition-era America because it was relatively simple to produce.

Sloe gin is traditionally described as a liqueur made by infusing sloes (the fruit of the blackthorn) in gin, although modern versions are almost always compounded from neutral spirits and flavourings. Similar infusions are possible with other fruits, such as damsons. Another popular gin-based liqueur with a long history is Pimm's No.1 Cup (25% alcohol by volume (ABV)), a fruit cup flavoured with citrus and spices.

The National Jenever Museums are located in Hasselt in Belgium, and Schiedam in the Netherlands.

=== 21st century ===
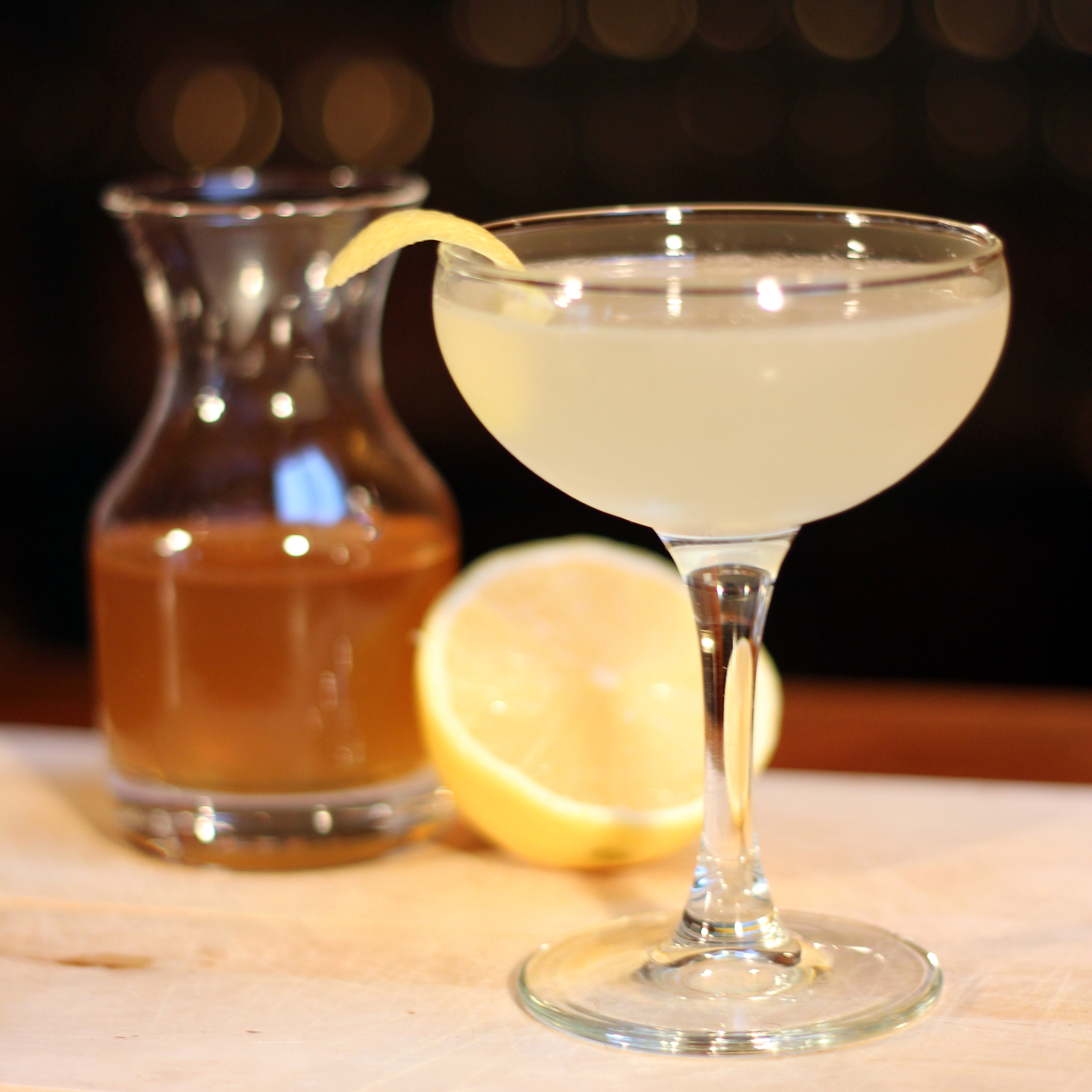
A Bee's Knees cocktail made with gin, honey, and lemon juice

Since 2013, gin has been in a period of ascendancy worldwide, with many new brands and producers entering the category leading to a period of strong growth, innovation and change. More recently gin-based liqueurs have been popularized, reaching a market outside that of traditional gin drinkers, including fruit-flavoured and usually coloured "Pink gin", rhubarb gin, Spiced gin, violet gin, blood orange gin, Caribbean gin and sloe gin. Surging popularity and unchecked competition have led consumers to conflate gin with gin liqueurs, and many products are straddling, pushing, or breaking the boundaries of established definitions during a period of genesis for the industry.

== Legal definition ==
=== Geographical indication ===
Some legal classifications (protected denomination of origin) define gin as originating only from specific geographical areas without any further restrictions (e.g. Plymouth gin (PGI now lapsed), Ostfriesischer Korngenever, Slovenská borovička, Kraški Brinjevec, etc.), while other common descriptors refer to classic styles that are culturally recognized, but not legally defined (e.g. Old Tom gin). Sloe gin is also worth mentioning, as although technically a gin-based liqueur, it is unique in that the EU spirit drink regulations stipulate the colloquial term "sloe gin" can legally be used without the "liqueur" suffix when certain production criteria are met.

=== Canada ===
According to the Canadian Food and Drug Regulations, gin is produced by redistilling alcohol from juniper berries or by redistilling a mixture of more than one such redistilled food product. The Canadian Food and Drug Regulation recognizes gin with three different definitions (Genever, Gin, London or Dry gin) that loosely approximate the US definitions. Whereas more detailed regulations are provided for Holland gin or genever, no distinction is made between compounded gin and distilled gin. Either compounded or distilled gin can be labelled as Dry Gin or London Dry Gin if it does not contain any sweetening agents. For Genever and Gin, they shall not contain more than two percent sweetening agents.

=== European Union ===
Although many different styles of gin have evolved, the European Union legally differentiates it into four categories, as follows.

==== Juniper-flavoured spirit drink ====
Juniper-flavoured spirit drinks include the earliest class of gin, produced by pot distilling a fermented grain mash to moderate strength (e.g., 68% ABV), then redistilling it with botanicals to extract aromatic compounds. It must be bottled at a minimum of 30% ABV. Juniper-flavoured spirit drinks may also be sold under the names Wacholder or Ginebra.

==== Gin ====
Gin is a juniper-flavoured spirit made not by redistilling botanicals, but by adding approved natural flavouring substances to a neutral spirit of agricultural origin. The predominant flavour must be juniper. Minimum bottled strength is 37.5% ABV.

==== Distilled gin ====
Distilled gin is produced exclusively by redistilling ethanol of agricultural origin with an initial strength of 96% ABV (the azeotrope of water and ethanol), in the presence of juniper berries and of other natural botanicals, provided that the juniper taste is predominant.

==== London gin ====
London gin is obtained exclusively from ethanol of agricultural origin with a maximum methanol content of 5 g (0.18 oz) per hectolitre of 100% ABV equivalent, whose flavour is introduced exclusively through the re-distillation in traditional stills of ethanol in the presence of all the natural plant materials used, the resultant distillate of which is at least 70% ABV. London gin may not contain added sweetening exceeding 0.1 g (0.0035 oz) of sugars per litre of the final product, nor colourants, nor any added ingredients other than water. The predominant flavour must be juniper. The term London gin may be supplemented by the term dry. Minimum bottled strength is 37.5% ABV.

Although London gin is the strictest of distilled gin categories, it is not a geographical designation.

=== United States ===
In the United States of America, "gin" is defined as an alcoholic beverage of no less than 40% ABV (80 proof) that possesses the characteristic flavour of juniper berries. Gin produced only through the redistillation of botanicals can be further distinguished and marketed as "distilled gin".

== Production ==
The ethyl alcohol of agricultural origin used to make gin is distilled from any carbohydrate-containing raw material, usually cereal or molasses. Gin gets its characteristic flavour from being flavoured with spices, primarily juniper berries and coriander.

=== Methods ===
Gin can be broadly differentiated into three basic styles reflecting modernization in its distillation and flavouring techniques:

Pot distilled gin is the earliest style of gin and is traditionally produced by pot distilling a fermented grain mash (malt wine) from barley or other grains, then redistilling it with flavouring botanicals to extract aromatic compounds. A double gin can be produced by redistilling the first gin again with more botanicals. Because it is made in pot stills, the alcohol content of the distillate is relatively low: around 68% ABV for a single-distilled gin or 76% ABV for a double gin. This type of gin is often aged in tanks or wooden casks, and retains a heavier, malty flavour that gives it a marked resemblance to whisky. Korenwijn (grain wine) and the oude (old) style of Geneva gin or Holland gin represent the most prominent gins of this class.

Column distilled gin evolved following the invention of the Coffey still, and is produced by first distilling high-proof (e.g., 96% ABV) neutral spirits from a fermented mash or wash using a refluxing still such as a column still. The fermentable base for this spirit may be derived from grain, sugar beets, grapes, potatoes, sugar cane, plain sugar, or any other agricultural material. The highly concentrated spirit is then redistilled with juniper berries and other botanicals in a pot still. Most often, the botanicals are suspended in a "gin basket" positioned within the head of the still, allowing the hot alcoholic vapours to extract flavouring components from the botanical charge. This method yields a gin lighter in flavour than the older pot still method, and results in either a distilled gin or London dry gin, depending largely upon how the spirit is finished. The evolution of hybrid (or computer-controlled) stills to control the amount of flavour or reflux has resulted in smoother spirits produced by smaller distilleries around the world.

Compound gin is made by compounding (blending) neutral spirits with essences, other natural flavourings, or ingredients left to infuse in neutral spirit without redistillation.

=== Flavouring ===
Botanical ingredients used to flavour gin include various spices, roots and fruits. The most common ingredient, besides the required juniper, is coriander, which adds a warm, spicy citrus-like flavour. Common spice botanicals include cinnamon, cassia, cardamom, pepper (black or sichuan), and nutmeg. Root botanicals, which add their own flavour and help combine and fix more volatile flavors, include angelica root, orris root, and liquorice root. Citrus peels are the most common fruit botanicals and are used for their flavourful oils, which impart fresh citrus flavours and a gentle heat; the most commonly used are lemon, orange, and grapefruit. Many distillers will add other exotic and mundane botanicals to impart a unique flavour and unique selling proposition; these include saffron, baobab, frankincense, clove, ginger, pine needles and cones, grains of paradise, dragon eye (longan), and many more.

Chemical research has begun to identify the various chemicals extracted during distillation that contribute to gin's flavour. For example, juniper monoterpenes come from juniper berries. Citric and berry flavours come from chemicals such as limonene, gamma-terpinene, and linalool found in limes, blueberries, and hops, among others. Floral notes come from compounds such as geraniol and eugenol. Spice-like flavours come from chemicals such as sabinene, delta-3-carene, and para-cymene.

In 2018, more than half the growth in the UK gin category was contributed by flavoured gin.

=== Similar spirits ===
A similar drink, also made with juniper berries and called Borovička, is produced in the Slovak Republic.

== Consumption ==
=== Classic gin cocktails ===
A well-known gin cocktail is the martini, traditionally made with gin and dry vermouth. Several other notable gin-based drinks include:

- 20th Century
- Aviation
- Bee's Knees
- Bloody Margaret
- Fallen Angel
- French 75
- Gibson
- Gimlet
- Gin and tonic
- Gin Fizz
- Gin Rickey
- Lonkero
- Moon River
- Negroni
- Old Etonian
- Pink Gin
- Ramos Gin Fizz
- Singapore Sling
- The Last Word
- Tom Collins
- Vesper
- White Lady

=== Notable brands ===
- Archie Rose Distilling Co. – Sydney microdistillery
- Aviation American Gin – Oregon, US, one of the early New Western style gins
- Barra – Scotland
- Beefeater – England, first produced in 1820
- Blackwood's – Scotland
- BOLS Damrak – Netherlands, jenever
- The Botanist – Hebridean island of Islay, Scotland, made with 31 botanicals, 22 being native to the island
- Bombay Sapphire – England, distilled with ten botanicals
- Boodles British Gin – England
- Booth's Gin – England
- Broker's Gin – England
- Brecon Gin – Wales
- Cadenhead’s Old Raj - Scotland
- Catoctin Creek – organic gin from Virginia, US
- Citadelle – France
- Cork Dry Gin – Ireland
- Edinburgh Gin – Scotland, distillery and visitor attraction in Edinburgh
- Gilbey's – England
- Gilpin's Westmorland Extra Dry Gin – England
- Ginebra San Miguel – Philippines
- Gordon's – England, first distilled in 1763
- Greenall's – England
- Hendrick's Gin – Scotland, infused with flavours of cucumber and rose petal
- Isle of Harris – Scotland
- Isle of Raasay – Scotland
- Konig's Westphalian Gin – Germany
- Leopolds Gin – Colorado, US
- Lind & Lime – Scotland, distillery and visitor attraction in Leith, Edinburgh
- Masons Gin – North Yorkshire, England
- Nicholson's – England, made in London from 1730
- Plymouth – England, first distilled in 1793
- Pickering's Gin – Scotland, from Edinburgh's first gin distillery in 150 years
- Sacred Microdistillery – England, from one of London's new micro-distilleries
- Seagram's – Quebec, Canada
- Sipsmith – England
- Smeets – Belgium, jenever
- Steinhäger – Germany
- St. George – California, US
- Taaka – Louisiana, US
- Tanqueray – England, first distilled in 1830
- Uganda Waragi – Uganda, triple distilled Waragi
- Vickers – South Australia
- Whitley Neill Gin – England

== See also ==
- Gin palace – Gin-selling establishment
- List of cocktails
- List of drinks
