= Sacred Spirits =

English microdistillery

- Company type: Private
- Industry: microdistillery & Distillation
- Founded: 2009
- Founder: Ian Hart and Hilary Whitney
- Headquarters: London
- Area served: Worldwide
- Products: Gin Vodka Exotic Distillates
- Website: sacredgin.com

Sacred Spirits (previously known as Sacred Microdistillery) is a microdistillery in Highgate, London. It distills its spirits under a vacuum in glassware, and thus at a lower temperature than traditional pot stills, which operate at atmospheric pressure. The microdistillery operates out of the back room of a residential house, with a vacuum plant in a wendy house in the distiller's back garden. It is an authorised Customs and Excise distillery.

== History ==
Sacred Spirits was established in London in 2009 and is the only vacuum distillery in London. Sipsmith Distillery in Hammersmith started at a similar time, but they use an atmospheric pressure copper pot technique. Sacred Spirits (originally named Sacred Microdistillery) was launched by Ian Hart and Hilary Whitney initially as a pure Gin distillery, but now produce flavoured vodkas using the same process.

Ian Hart, who had previously worked as a Wall Street banker, was laid off in 2008. After his layoff, he began to conduct tests on the production of gin starting in September 2008. After conducting 23 gin-making experiments, he made the initial batch of Sacred Gin on May 22, 2009, and founded Sacred Spirits. The recipe, which had 12 botanicals including juniper, cardamom, nutmeg, and Boswellia sacra, had a "fresh, creamy and aromatic quality" according to Tina Brown in her book Gin: An Illustrated History. Sacred Gin received a Double Gold Medal during the 2013 San Francisco World Spirits Competition. Eric Grossman wrote in his book Craft Spirits that "Sacred has turned gin on its head by favoring vacuum distillation instead of traditional pot distillation". The distillery is in Highgate, North London in Ian Hart's house. His wife, Hilary Whitney, operates the company with him. People from 17 countries purchased 34,000 bottles of gin from the company in 2014. Sacred Spirits also has created vodka, whisky, vermouth, and negroni products.

Sacred Microdistillery is based on a residential street in North London. It distributes its products to over 50 bars and restaurants in North and Central London, This includes Duke's Bar in St James's, where Ian Fleming invented the Vesper cocktail. It is also stocked by Fortnum and Mason in Piccadilly, and Le Manoir aux Quat' Saisons in Oxfordshire, and Gerry's of Old Compton Street.

Hart started on a small scale, and personally delivered stock to local bars and restaurants on London's tubes and buses before acquiring an on-trade distributor, Coe Vintners.

== Products ==
Sacred Microdistillery's first two spirits are Sacred Vodka and Sacred Gin, both of which are produced in small batches of a few hundred bottles a time, from English Grain Spirit. Each batch is made with two or three fractions: the initial one is collected under glass coils cooled with iced water (about 0 °C), the middle is collected under a cold finger cooled to -89 °C with dry ice (solid CO_{2}), and the final fraction is collected under liquid nitrogen under a cold finger at -196 °C. The separately distilled botanicals therefore produce 2-3 fractions each, which are blended as the final part of the process.

Sacred Gin is 40% ABV. It uses 12 botanicals including: Juniper, Angelica Root, Fresh Orange Peel, Fresh Lemon Peel and Fresh Lime Peel, Cardamom. and Frankincense.

Sacred Vodka is 40% ABV. It is a wholly redistilled flavoured vodka using 7 botanicals including: Cubeb, Angelica Root, Nutmeg, and Frankincense.

== Reception ==
In his book, Craft Spirits, Eric Grossman praised Sacred Gin for being "a beautifully balanced spirit". Writing in his book The Book of Gin about Sacred Gin, Richard Barnett said, "there's a remarkable clarity and intensity of flavor here, balanced with a fragrant creaminess" and "this is a gin which can be nosed and sipped like a good wine".
