= Catoctin Creek =

Catoctin Creek is the name of two streams in the Mid-Atlantic region of the United States:

- Catoctin Creek (Maryland)
- Catoctin Creek (Virginia)

Catoctin Creek is also a distillery in Purcellville, Virginia, in the United States:

- Catoctin Creek Distilling Company
