= The Drinks Business =

Monthly international B2B magazine

- Cover of the October 2024 issue
- Editor-in-chief: Patrick Schmitt MW
- Categories: Wine magazines
- Frequency: Monthly
- Publisher: Union Press Ltd
- Founded: 2002
- Country: United Kingdom
- Language: English
- Website: www.thedrinksbusiness.com

The Drinks Business is a monthly international B2B magazine and website published by Union Press. The magazine discusses the latest news and trends in the global beer, wine and spirits industries.

== History and profile ==
The Drinks Business was launched in 2002. It has an international audience of 828,000 monthly readers

== db Awards ==
The db Awards is an annual drinks industry event, held at the London International Wine Fair in Olympia. Winners in 2013 included Beefeater Gin, Cote du Rhone, Roberson Wine and Dubai Duty Free.

== Green Awards ==
The Drinks Business Green Awards is the world's largest programme to raise awareness of green issues in the drinks trade. Winners in 2013 included Sainsbury's, John E Fells and Wetherspoons.
