= De Hamborger Veermaster =

Sea shanty

De Hamborger Veermaster (German: Der Hamburger Viermaster, English: The Hamburg Four-master) is a sea shanty sung in Low German, presumably first published between 1850 and 1890. It is partly in English, and that part uses lines of the shanty "The Banks of the Sacramento".

== Lyrics ==
Ick heff mol een Hamborger Veermaster sehn,
𝄆 To my hooday! 𝄇
De Masten so scheef as den Schipper sien Been,
To my hoo day, hoo day, ho – ho – ho – ho!
Refrain:
𝄆 Blow, boys, blow, for Californio,
There's plenty of gold, so I am told,
On the banks of Sacramento. 𝄇

Dat Deck weer vun Isen, vull Dreck un vull Smeer.
𝄆 To my hooday! 𝄇
"Rein Schipp" weer den Oll'n sin scheunstes Pläseer.
To my hoo day, hoo day, ho – ho – ho – ho!
Refrain:

De Kombüs weer vull Lüüs, de Kajüt weer vull Schiet,
𝄆 To my hooday! 𝄇
De Beschüten, de leupen von sülvens all wech.
To my hoo day, hoo day, ho – ho – ho – ho!
Refrain:

Dat Soltfleesch weer greun, un de Speck wör vull Modn.
𝄆 To my hooday! 𝄇
Un Köm geef dat blots an Wiehnachtsobend.
To my hoo day, hoo day, ho – ho – ho – ho!
Refrain:

Un wulln wi mol seiln, ick sech ji dat nur,
𝄆 To my hooday! 𝄇
Denn lööp he dree vorut un veer wedder retur.
To my hoo day, hoo day, ho – ho – ho – ho!
Refrain:

Un as dat Schipp, so weer ok de Kaptein,
𝄆 To my hooday! 𝄇
De Lüüd för dat Schipp, de weern ok blots schangheit.
To my hoo day, hoo day, ho – ho – ho – ho!
Refrain:

I once saw a four-master from Hamburg.
𝄆 To my hooday! 𝄇
Her masts were as crooked as the skipper's legs.
To my hoo day, hoo day, ho – ho – ho – ho!
Refrain:
𝄆 Blow, boys, blow, for Californio,
There's plenty of gold, so I am told,
On the banks of Sacramento. 𝄇

The deck was of iron, full of dirt and grease.
𝄆 To my hooday! 𝄇
"Clean the ship" was the captain's most liked pleasure.
To my hoo day, hoo day, ho – ho – ho – ho!
Refrain

The galley was full of lice, the cabin was full of shit.
𝄆 To my hooday! 𝄇
The hardtack walked away all by itself.
To my hoo day, hoo day, ho – ho – ho – ho!
Refrain

The salted meat was green, the bacon was full of maggots
𝄆 To my hooday! 𝄇
Köm was only there at Christmas Eve.
To my hoo day, hoo day, ho – ho – ho – ho!
Refrain

And if we wanted to sail, I merely say,
𝄆 To my hooday! 𝄇
She moved three fathom ahead and four back again.
To my hoo day, hoo day, ho – ho – ho – ho!
Refrain

And like the ship, so the captain was,
𝄆 To my hooday! 𝄇
The men for the ship were all shanghaied.
To my hoo day, hoo day, ho – ho – ho – ho!
Refrain

== Melody ==
Source

== See also ==
- List of songs about Hamburg
