= Köm =

- Knödel — dumplings
- a type of juniper-flavoured spirit or Wacholder
