= Summerhall =

Multi-arts complex and events venue in Edinburgh, Scotland

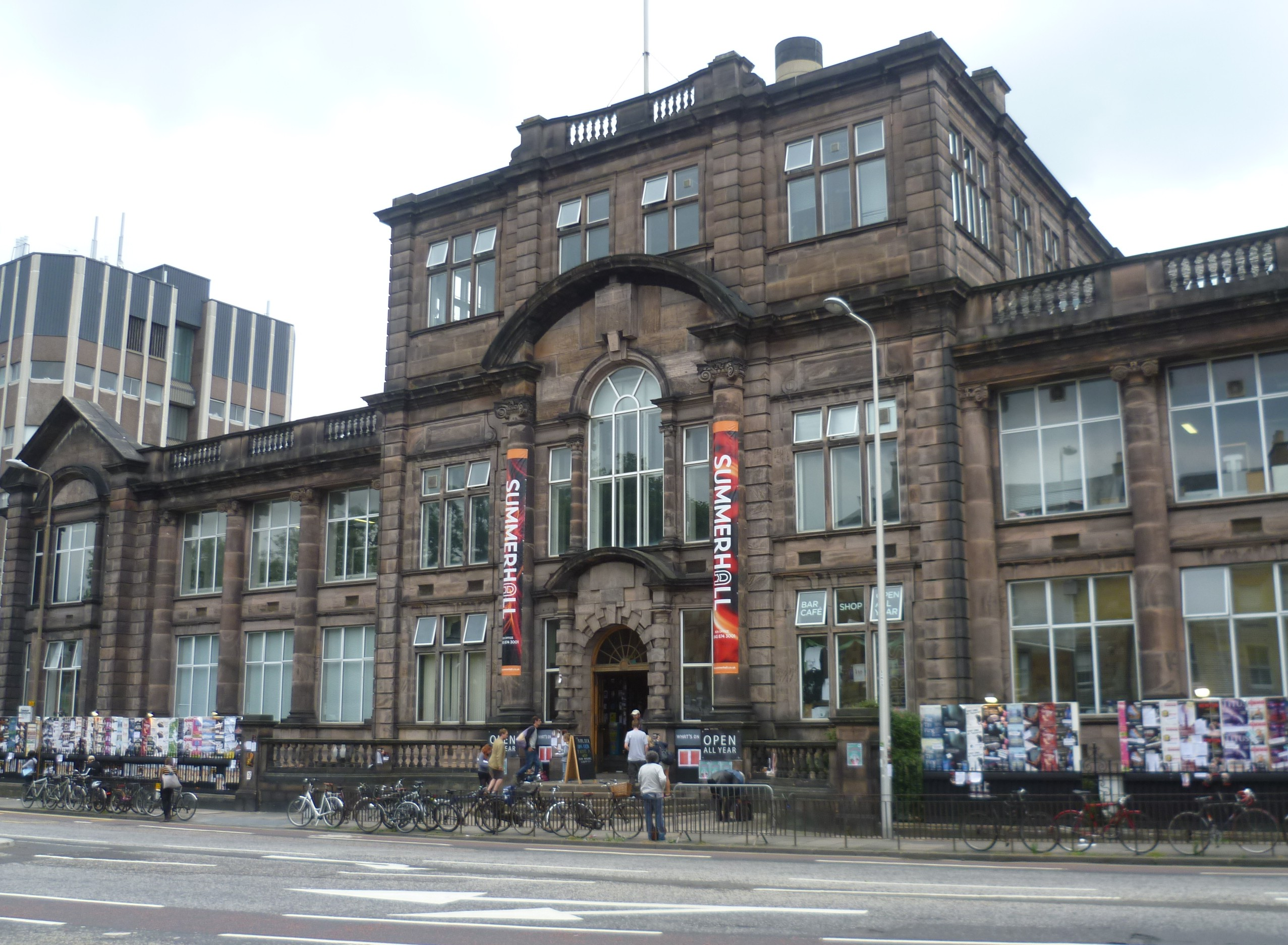
- The front of Summerhall
- Interactive map of Summerhall
- Address: 1, Summerhall, Edinburgh EH9 1PL
- Location: Edinburgh, Scotland
- Coordinates: 55.9399°N 3.1822°W
- Owner: Oesselmann Estate

Website
- www.summerhallarts.co.uk

Summerhall is an arts complex and events venue in Edinburgh, Scotland. Formerly home to the Royal (Dick) School of Veterinary Studies of the University of Edinburgh, it is now a major Edinburgh Festival Fringe visual and performing arts venue. It also hosts events for the Edinburgh Science Festival and Edinburgh International Magic Festival and provides a home for arts practitioners year round; its many rooms are used for art exhibitions, drama and music performances, libraries, small museums, educational & research programmes, artist studios, arts organisation offices, and workshops.

== History ==
Early records show the Summerhall site being used by a family run brewery, which was established in the 1710s. All that remains of this brewery are a well and stone rubble sandstone boundary wall. Terraced houses and shops occupied the site for many years, until they made way for the purpose-built Royal (Dick) Veterinary College, when it moved from Clyde Street in the north of the city.

Building on the college began in 1913, and on 21 July 1914, a memorial stone and time capsule were laid underneath the grand entrance steps. Work ceased on the outbreak of the First World War, due to a lack of labour as young men joined the armed forces. The veterinary college moved to the site in 1916, and the college was based in the main building and wings to the rear courtyard. The 11-bay Edwardian Baroque structure, facing the Meadows, is Category B Listed Building.

The Anatomy Lecture Theatre, still extant, has wooden, curved, tiered seating and vaulted sky light. It is the last surviving example of this type of lecture theatre at veterinary colleges in the United Kingdom.

Elsewhere on the site, the space known as the "Tech Cube", at the corner of Summerhall Crescent and Hope Park Terrace, was originally the Hope Park United Presbyterian Church designed by famous Edinburgh architects Peddie and Mackay. It opened for worship in September 1867, and its spire could be seen from a large distance. The Hope Park Church Galleries were originally the Hope Park and Buccleuch Congregational Church, built in 1876 and designed to seat 730.

=== Since the 20th century ===
The veterinary college became a full faculty of the University of Edinburgh in 1964, and the school continued on the site until 2010, when the Royal Dick relocated to a new campus at Easter Bush in the south of the city.

In November 2011, the former college buildings were acquired by the McDowell family, and developed under the direction of Robert McDowell as a multi-arts, and arts-related organisation and business, centre. The Summerhall arts complex includes a bar and restaurant (The Royal Dick), a microbrewery (Barney's Beer) and the Summerhall distillery. Reputedly the biggest private art centre in Europe, it became major venue, each August, for the Edinburgh Fringe, and achieved a footfall of over 1 million visitors a year. In 2016 The New York Times described it as "packed with warrens and small hallways that make it a fabulous place to wander for a few hours, especially if there’s a performance happening."

In May 2024, the owners announced their intention to place the 130,00 sq ft complex, with leases intact for over 100 artists, small businesses and companies, on the open market. Consistent with announcement by selling agents Cuthbert White that the owners were seeking a means of continuing the site's arts legacy, in March 2025 a charity formed by former Summerhall staff and tenants to rescue the arts venue signed a lease on the main building. Summerhall Arts, which has the prospect of continuing its lease from 2028, is committed to maintaining an arts programme while the prospective buyers, AMA Newtown, seek planning consents for a redevelopment of the remainder of the former campus.

AMA, in turn, has pledged that the arts will remain a priority in developing its mixed-use plan for the site. When, in October 2024, its conditional bid was accepted, Dr Ali Afshar, AMA's co-founder and managing director, stated

Summerhall is a complex city centre site, steeped in history and containing a number of listed buildings. Its use as a Fringe venue and home to small businesses has given it a special place in the hearts of local people. As we start to develop plans for its future, we intend to treat Summerhall with respect and consideration for its rich history, with an ongoing commitment to continue supporting the arts on the site.

Since mounting its 14th Festival programme in August 2025, Summerhall has continued, under Summerhall Arts, as a major venue for the Edinburgh Fringe.

In October 2026, AMA announced plans to demolish part of the site, and to develop it for a mix of commercial, hospitality and residential uses. The company lodged a pre-planning application notice with Edinburgh Council, and announced its intention to submit a full planning application early in 2027.
