= Caledonia Spirits =

Distillery in Montpelier, Vermont (e. 2011)

- Founded: c. 2011
- Headquarters: 116 Gin Lane, Montpelier, Vermont
- Products: Gin, vodka
- Website: caledoniaspirits.com

Caledonia Spirits is a craft distillery in Montpelier, Vermont. The distillery is known for its Barr Hill-brand spirits, including gin, vodka, and an Old Tom gin called Tom Cat. The company's flagship product is its Barr Hill Gin, which is the top-selling Vermont-made spirit and the most awarded gin made in the US.

== History ==
The distillery was originally located in Hardwick in Vermont's Caledonia County (in the Northeast Kingdom). It was founded by Todd Hardie, a lifelong beekeeper who wanted to popularize honey-based beverages and highlight the important and threatened role of bees in the environment. Ryan Christiansen serves as the company's president and head distiller. The two met in 2011, while Hardie was using raw honey in his small production winery at the time. In the 2010s, the company moved to Montpelier, opening a 27,000-square-foot distillery and in 2019, the company expanded its presence there by opening a cocktail bar and retail store.

== Operations ==
The distillery distributes to 32 U.S. states, as well as Montreal, and other foreign cities with cocktail cultures. Product volume tripled from 2015 to 2019 and continues to grow rapidly, leading to about 60,000 4.5L cases shipped per year.

Each year since 2017, Caledonia Spirits has hosted a Bee's Knees Week, an event to raise funds to plant pollinator habitats across the U.S. The event, hosted in late September each year, is an effort to combat pollinator decline. The 2021 fundraiser had a goal of planting 50,000 square feet (4,600 m^{2}) of bee habitats.

=== Products ===
The company's Barr Hill Gin uses raw honey sourced from Vermont. The raw honey maintains aromatics from the bees' foraging practices, with an estimated 100 to 115 different pollen and plant particles found in their raw honey.

The company's vodka is distilled from only raw honey sourced from a 250-mile radius around the Barr Hill distillery. The process requires 4 lb (1.8 kg) of honey per 750 mL bottle. The honey is not heated prior to fermentation, preserving natural aromatics. The vodka is also distilled only one to two times, keeping flavors that could otherwise be removed through subsequent distillations.

== Reception ==
A Forbes review of top gins in 2019 listed Barr Hill first, recommending it for its botanical notes and for use in a white Negroni.
