= Lind & Lime gin distillery =

Gin distillery in Leith, Edinburgh, Scotland

Lind & Lime Gin Distillery

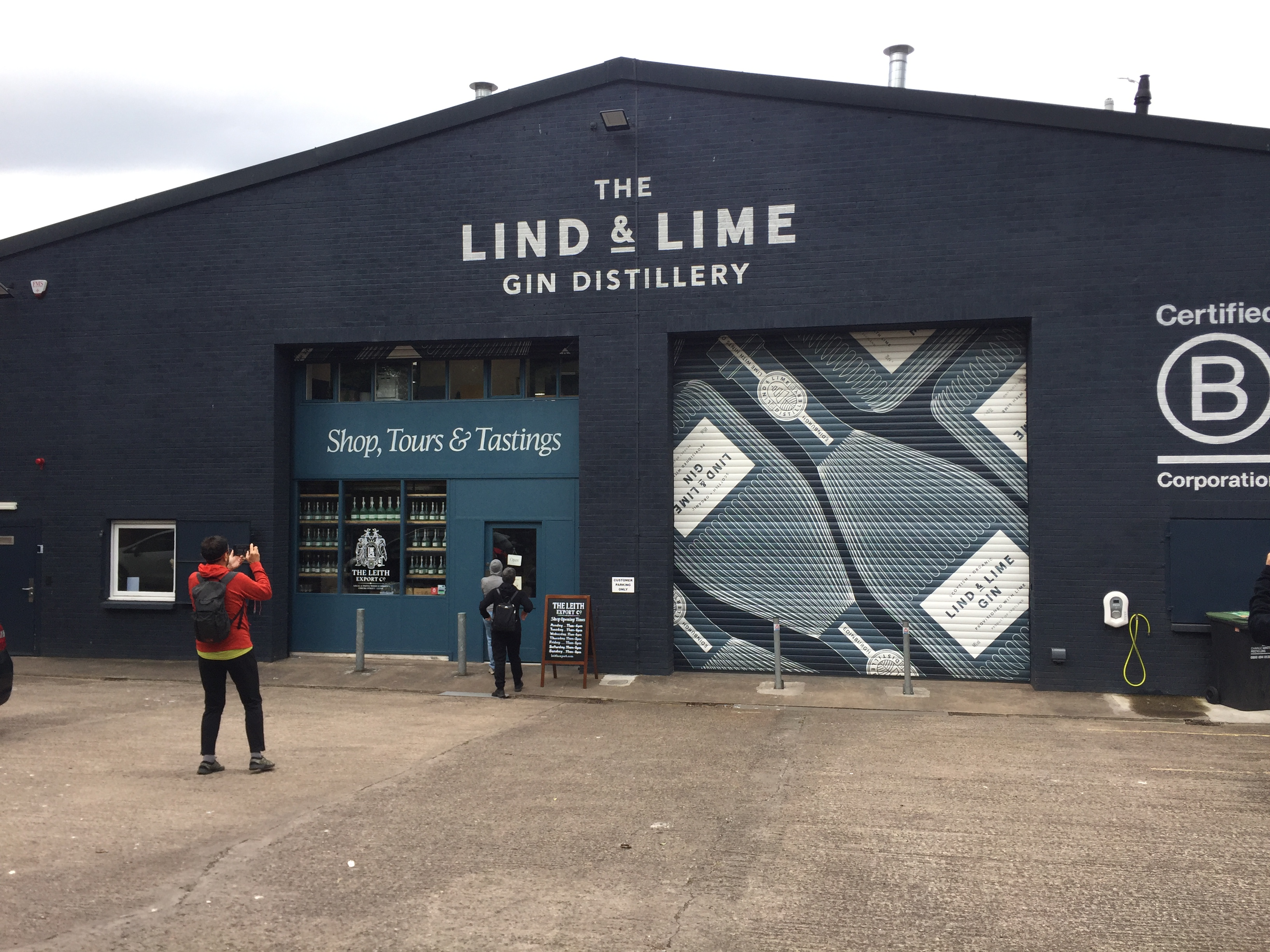
- The front facade of Lind & Lime Gin Distillery
- Location: Edinburgh, Scotland, UK
- Coordinates: 55.9763°N 3.1752°W
- Owner: Muckle Brig Ltd.
- Founded: 28 May 2022; 4 years ago
- Founder: Ian Stirling; Paddy Fletcher
- Status: Operational

Lind & Lime Gin Distillery is a distillery and tourist attraction in the Leith area of Edinburgh, Scotland.

The distillery produces the titular Lind & Lime gin, a maritime-style spirit known for its distinctive bottle. The distillery is organic certified and operates as a B-corp.

== History ==
The distillery was co-founded by friends Ian Stirling and Paddy Fletcher as an extension of their drinks importer, Muckle Brig. Stirling had previously worked for Roberson Wine; Fletcher had worked in finance. Gin production was initially incidental; gin was seen as a revenue stream to fund the construction of the Port of Leith whisky distillery.

The first iteration of the distillery was located in an industrial unit in Tower Street, Leith; both the site and the stills were shared with rival gin producers Electric Spirit Co. This site was 100sqm; it was later described by the SLTN trade newspaper as "the smallest space in which it was technically possible to distill gin". The first bottling of Lind & Lime gin was released in November 2018.

By 2021, the gin was bringing in gross profit of £1 million, and Lind & Lime began to search for a larger production premises within Leith. The chosen site, on Coburn Street, was a former sportswear warehouse, and £600,000 was invested in its renovation.

The new distillery opened to the public in May 2022. It was around six times larger than the previous distillery premises. The site included a bottling plant and offered public tours, which were expected to attract 10,000 visitors per year.

The distillery received organic food certification from the Scottish Organic Producers Association in 2023, and was B-corp accredited the following year. In October 2024, the distillery launched an certified organic furoshiki gift wrap, the first UK spirits brand to do so.

== Products ==
The core product from the distillery is Lind & Lime gin, a maritime-style recipe with seven botanicals including lime. The product was originally to be called "The Antidote", but the name was changed following a trademark dispute.

The bottle is shaped similarly to a wine bottle as a reference to the historic wine trade occurring in the Port of Leith. The company have publicly clashed with other drinks producers over purported similarities in packaging design, including with Australian gin producers SoHi, and with Scottish producers Brewdog over their Casa Reyes tequila bottle.

The distillery diversified into ready-to-drink products in 2024 with a bottled Negroni, designed in collaboration with Edinburgh cocktail bar Hey Palu. The first travel-retail exclusive product from the distillery, a bergamot flavoured gin, was released in 2025.
