= Port of Leith distillery =

Distillery in Edinburgh, Scotland

Port of Leith Distillery

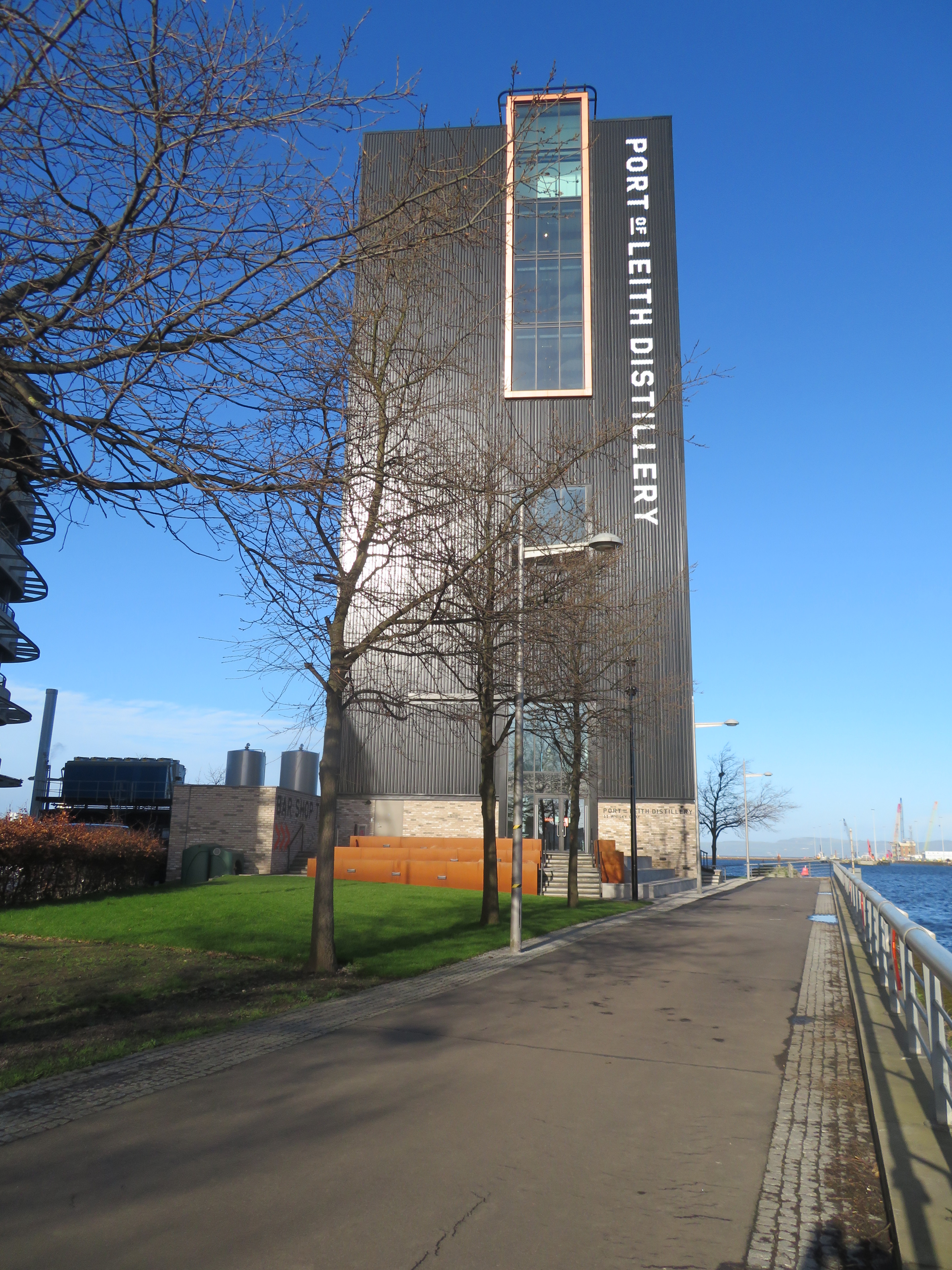

Region: Lowland
- Location: Edinburgh, Scotland, UK
- Coordinates: 55°58′58″N 3°10′32″W
- Owner: Muckle Brig Ltd.
- Founded: 2023; 3 years ago
- Founder: Paddy Fletcher and Ian Stirling
- Status: Operational
- No. of stills: 1 wash still 1 spirit still
- Capacity: 400,000 L
- Website: www.leithdistillery.com

Map
- Port of Leith (Edinburgh)

The Port of Leith distillery is a whisky distillery in Edinburgh, Scotland. It is located in the Leith area of the city, close to the Ocean Terminal shopping centre and the Royal Yacht Britannia.

It is the first vertical distillery to be built in the United Kingdom, the building reaching nine storeys tall. As well as being a working distillery, it is also a visitor attraction with panoramic views of the city from a top-floor bar. The vertical layout is the result of the small plot of land it is built on; this caused significant challenges during the design and construction, and the project ended up costing £12m.

== History ==
Port of Leith distillery was founded by Paddy Fletcher and Ian Stirling in 2023. Fletcher and Stirling had previously founded Lind & Lime gin distillery.

The planning application was made in 2017, and was granted in 2019. Construction of the distillery started in 2020, but was delayed due to the COVID-19 pandemic.

The distillery opened to the public on 11 October 2023, after four years of construction, but did not start producing new-make spirit until early 2024.

== See also ==
- Scotch whisky
- Lowland single malts
