= Broker's Gin =

Gin brand from England

Broker's London Dry Gin
- Type: Gin
- Distributor: Hood River Distillers
- Origin: England
- Alcohol by volume: 40 and 47
- Proof (US): 80 and 94
- Website: brokersgin.com

Broker’s London Dry Gin is a brand of gin contract-distilled at Langley Distillery near Birmingham, England, using a traditional copper pot still.

Broker’s Gin uses a combination of ten botanicals. It is available in two strengths: 40% and 47% alc/vol (80 proof and 94 proof) in 1.75L, 1.0L, 750ml, 700ml and 50ml sizes.

== History ==
Broker’s Gin was created by brothers Martin and Andy Dawson in the late 1990s. England has a long tradition of gin production. For this reason, in 1998, they chose a theme for the brand that would be recognised for its Englishness – a gentleman wearing a bowler hat, representing a stockbroker in the City of London - hence the name “Broker’s” for the brand. Every bottle of Broker’s Gin is topped with a miniature plastic bowler hat.

Broker’s Gin is distributed across the United States and in over 40 other countries. It was introduced to the U.S. market in 2001 in partnership with Hood River Distillers, Inc.

== Distilling Process ==
The base spirit for Broker's Gin is quadruple-distilled grain spirit made from wheat. The gin uses ten botanicals, including juniper, orange and lemon peel, nutmeg and cassia bark. The botanicals are steeped in the base spirit in the still for 24 hours. The spirit is then distilled a fifth and final time.

== Recognition ==
- Gold Medal & Best Buy, 92 Points, "Exceptional," Chicago Beverage Testing Institute (2012).
- Top 20 Gin as designated by ratings aggregator Proof66.com.
- Chairman's Trophy, Extra Dry Martini, Ultimate Cocktail Challenge (2012).
- Chairman's Trophy, Aviation, Ultimate Cocktail Challenge (2012).
- Masters Award (Super Premium category), London Gin Masters (2011).
