= Brinjevec =

Slovenian alcoholic drink

Brinjevec (or Brinovec) is a strong alcoholic drink unique to Slovenia, produced in the Karst and Brkini regions in Slovenia. It is distilled only from ground and fermented juniper berries and differs from similar drinks with different alcohol bases and added juniper flavor (compound Gin, Slovak Borovička, Dutch Jenever, Serbian Klekovača, etc.). It has a clear, transparent color and is meant for folk medicinal use, not regular drinking. It contains between 40% and 50% alcohol and has a very distinctive tart taste

Kraški brinjevec means 'Karst gin' or 'Karst juniper brandy'.

== History ==
The word brinovec derives from brin ('juniper') and refers to a product made from juniper berries.

Kraški brinjevec has been made by local farmers in the Karst and Brkini regions for centuries. It was first mentioned 200 years ago. It has always been appreciated by locals for its curative effects and for treating many problems. Because it is fermented only from juniper berries (from 100 to 150 kilos of berries for 10 liters of spirit) and distilled and re-distilled in a special copper still, it costs €30 or more per liter (2010) if buying from local farmers.

Kraški brinjevec is mentioned in several books such as National Geographic's Taste Slovenia by Janez Bogataj and Lonely Planet's Slovenia - History, Culture & Outdoors as an exquisite traditional drink. It has also found its way into the brochure of Slovene souvenirs published by "Slovenia's Official Travel Guide".

Brinjevec is also sold in some bars and inns for drinking. However, in most cases, such brinjevec is merely a cheap surrogate of traditional Karst brinjevec. It is usually made from plum brandy, tropinovec (pomace brandy), or even alcohol made from fermented potatoes with added juniper flavor. Some prefer it this way as the taste is milder, and it is more drinkable.

== Geographical indication of Kraški brinjevec ==
The Slovenian parliament passed the Act on Rules Concerning the Designation of Geographical Origin of Kraški brinjevec (Karst Gin) on 30 June 2003. On 15 January 2008 the European Parliament passed a regulation on the definition, description, presentation, labeling, and protection of geographical indications of spirit drinks and repealing Council Regulation (EEC) No 1576/89. Under this regulation, brinjevec became a protected drink with geographical origin.

The experts of the European Commission were primarily interested in the natural process of brinjevec production, which is produced without any additives. Because of its traditional production and the characteristics of kraški brinjevec, the drink is a candidate for classification as a specialty on the list of world-famous drinks.

Kraški brinjevec is made of juniper berries from the species Juniperus communis. Juniperus communis is a barbed evergreen shrub or low tree that grows in a dry karst terrain. It is a monosexual plant, and only female plants produce berries. Juniper berries ripen only every two or even three years, so the same bush often carries both mature and immature berries. Mature berries are fleshy, dark blue, and have a refreshing fruity smell and a slightly sweet, bitter taste.

Berries are gathered in October and November using a wooden stick and a specially shaped riddle. The work is difficult and time-consuming. After that, the berries are cleaned, ground with a special grinder, and soaked in water (3 to 4 times the quantity of berries) in a hermetically sealed container for 4 weeks at 15 to 20 degrees Celsius.

After the alcoholic fermentation of the mash ends, distillation happens in two steps in special copper stills. Copper is commonly used to build high-quality stills because it absorbs sulfur compounds in the distilled vapor. During the first distillation, an essential oil (brinjevo olje 'juniper oil') is separated from the spirit. Half a liter of oil is obtained from 100 kg of juniper berries. The second distillation is long and slow. The brandy gets its harmonious flavor only after six months of ripening.

The shape and volume of bottles (200, 500, and 700 ml) are also prescribed.

== Medicinal use ==
Brinjevec is used as a traditional folk medicine for many problems. It stimulates blood flow in the abdominal cavity and helps treat stomachache, indigestion, gastritis, and intestinal problems. It is also used as a digestive. In the past, women used it to soothe menstrual pain. They often anointed the lower abdomen with ethereal juniper oil (a side product after first distillation), followed by a sip of brinjevec. Some older people still call brinjevec a women's drink because, in the past, the domestic pharmacy was under women's domain. Inhaling steam from boiling water mixed with a few drops of brinjevec relieves the respiratory passages and alleviates respiratory problems in asthmatics.

Essential oil is a side product of distilling brinjevec. As mentioned, it was used to ease menstrual pain and stomach ache, or to cure digestion problems in children, by anointing it around the navel and lower abdomen. This oil was sold in the past to local pharmacies, mostly in Trieste (Italy), and is still very expensive (€160 or more per liter in 2010).

Juniper oil is also used to add flavors to some gins.

This oil is called brinjevo olje in Slovene

== Major brands ==
Most of the commercially produced brinjevec is made from imported juniper berries from Bosnia-Herzegovina, Montenegro, and other Balkan countries. Some brinjevec is only a flavored aged natural distillate even if sold as brinjevec. These brandies do not bear the geographical indication kraški brinjevec.

Several registered distilleries around Slovenia distill and sell brinjevec, but it can also be bought in small quantities from local farmers who distill it for personal use.

Kraški Brinjevec

- Brin - Brinjevec
- Kraševka
- Budič, Budič Brinjevec

Brinjevec

- Dana
- Klanšek
- Kmetija Matic
- Kartuzija Pleterje
- Mikelj Spirits
