= Whitley Neill Gin =

London Dry gin

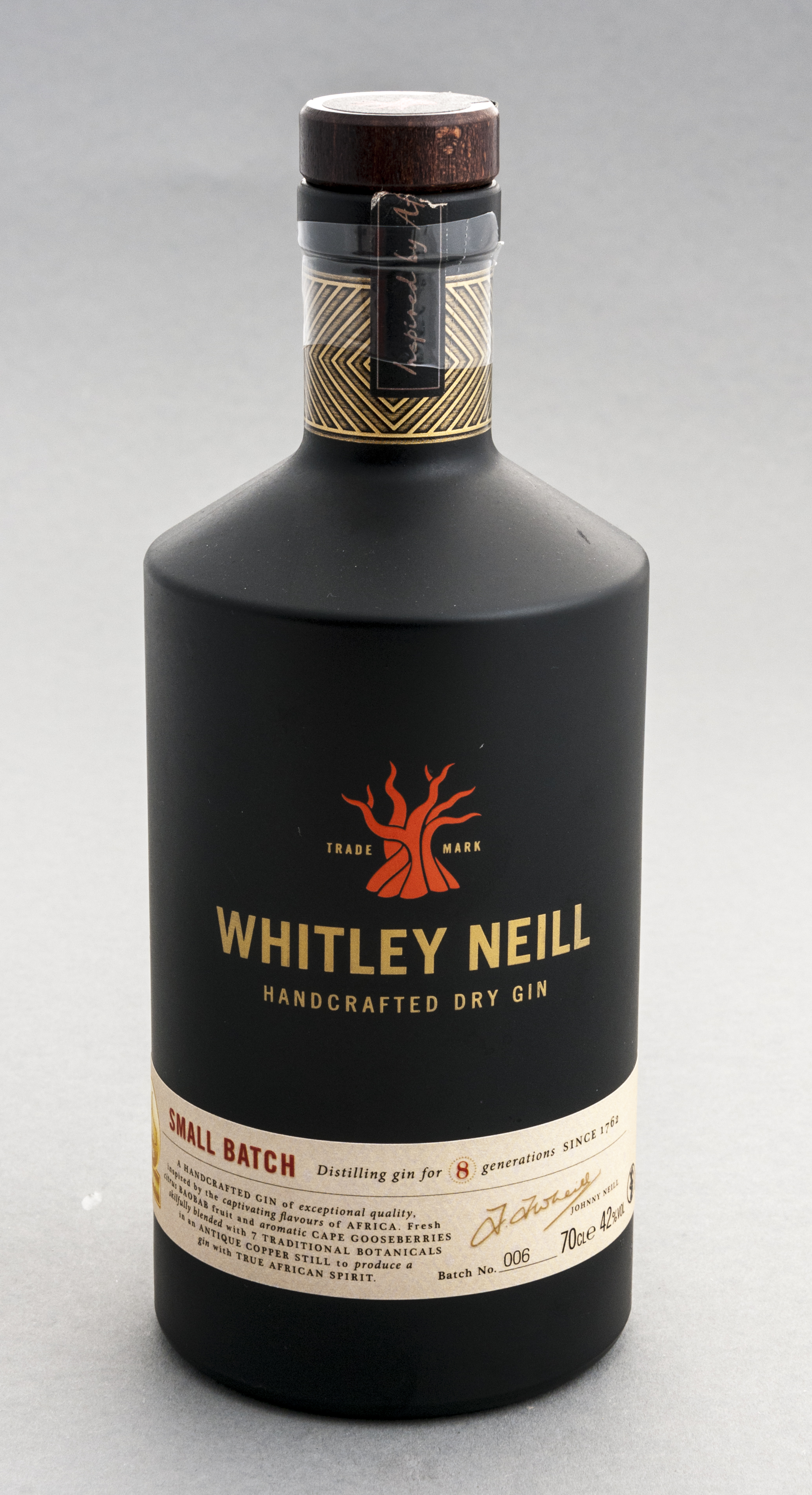
Original Whitley Neill Gin

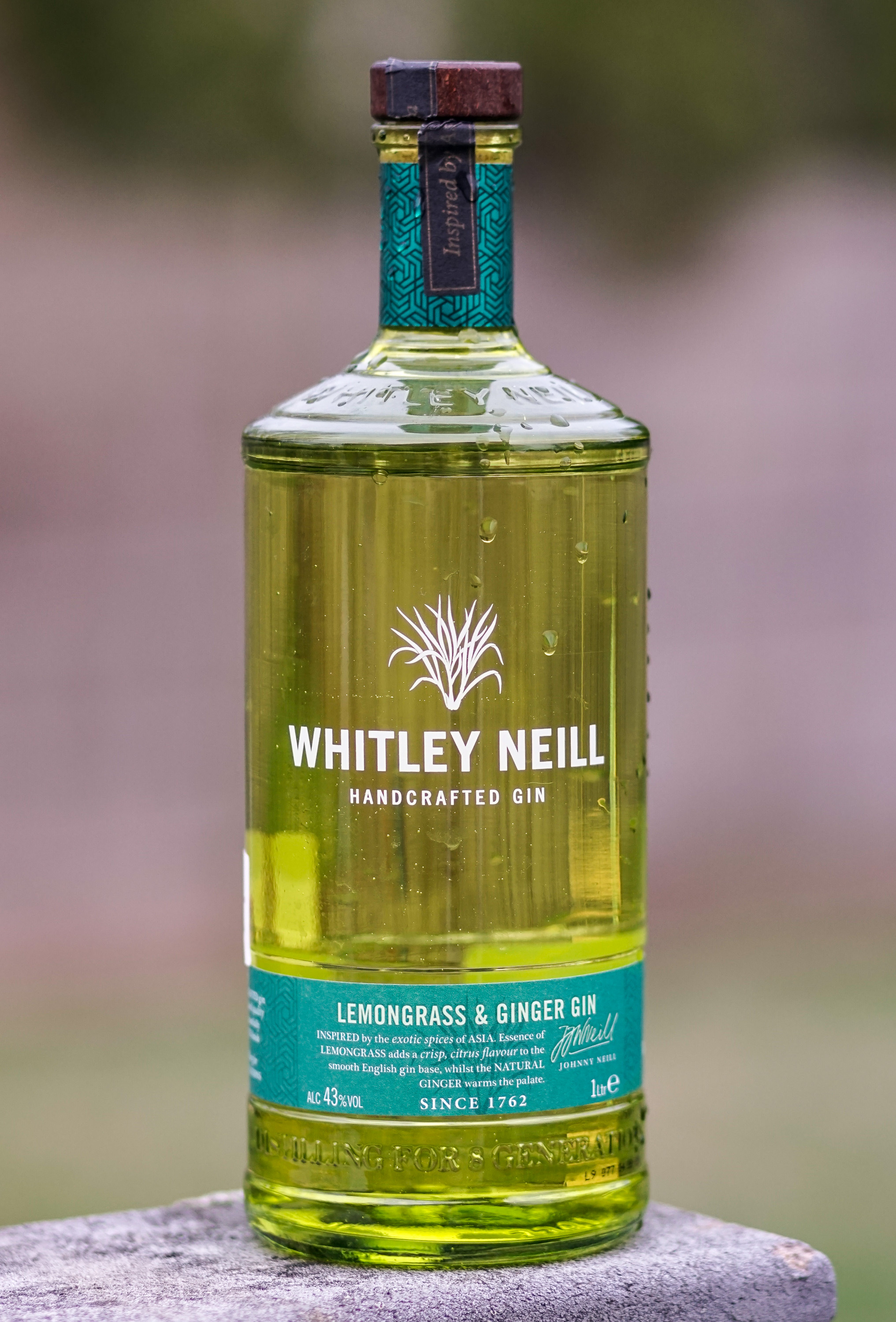
Whitley Neill Lemongrass and Ginger Gin

Whitley Neill Gin is a London Dry gin.

== History ==
The brand was launched in 2005 and acquired by Halewood Wines & Spirits in 2009.

== Distillation and products ==
The gin is distilled by Johnny Neill, a descendant of Thomas Greenall, in an antique copper pot still.

The gin contains two African botanicals — Baobab Fruit and Cape Gooseberries as well as coriander seeds, sweet lemon, sweet orange, angelica root, cassia bark, florentine iris and juniper berries. Whitney Neill also produces a multitude of flavoured variations.

In 2021, the distillery moved to London and is now produced at a site named Halewood's City of London Distillery. The gin distillery was previously located just outside Birmingham in the West Midlands.

The gin was originally sold in a distinctive matte black bottle with a stylised baobab tree as its logo. It was redesigned in 2013.

In 2014, Whitley Neill won a gold medal at the San Francisco Spirits Competition 2014 and was referenced in The Telegraph Online as one of the five best gins to buy.

== Awards ==
- Gold in the San Francisco World Spirits Competition 2014
- Gin Master, Super premium Category, The Drinks Business Gin Masters Competition 2013
- Gold Medal - Super Premium Category - International Spirits Challenge 2013
- International Wine & Spirit Trophy 2011: Gold Award Trophy. Best in Class.
- Gold in the International Wine & Spirit Competition 2011: Best in Class
- Gold in The Spirits Business Awards 2010: Premium Category
- Double Gold in the San Francisco World Spirits Competition 2009
- Gold in the International Review of Spirits by Beverage Testing Institute 2008
- Double Gold medal San Francisco World Spirits Competition 2007
- Gold Medal, "Best in Class" International Wine & Spirits Competition 2007
- 91 points, Gold Medal - rated "Exceptional" BTI Chicago 2007
