= Bee's knees =

Prohibition Era cocktail made with gin

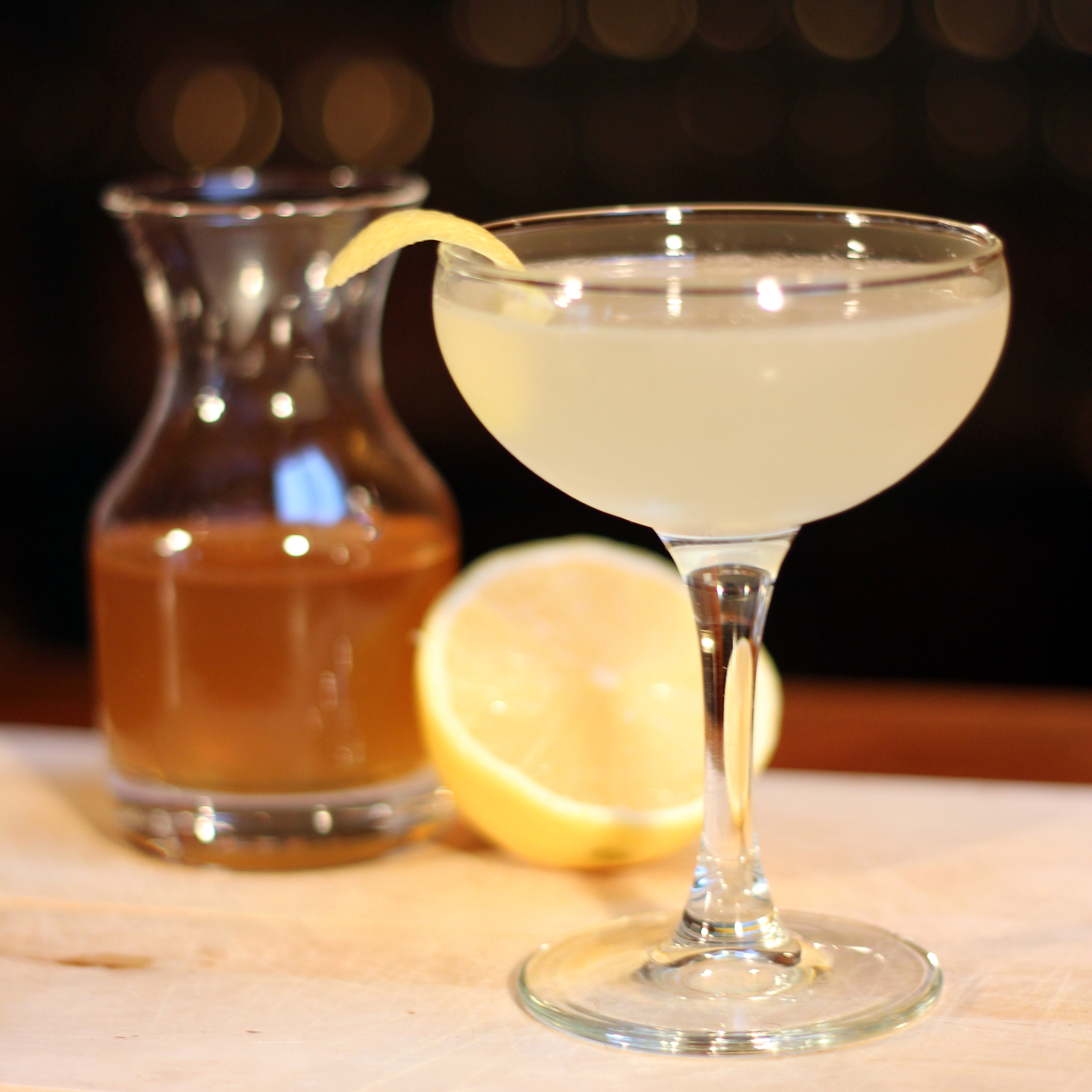
- A bee's knees cocktail made with gin, 1:1 honey syrup, lemon juice and orange juice
- Type: Cocktail
- Ingredients: 2oz gin; 1oz honey syrup; 1oz lemon juice; 1oz orange juice; garnish with lemon peel
- Standard drinkware: Cocktail glass
- Standard garnish: Garnish with lemon peel
- Served: Straight up: chilled, without ice
- Preparation: Combine gin, honey syrup, lemon juice and orange juice into a mixing tin. Shake. Strain into chilled cocktail glass. Garnish with lemon peel.

A bees knees (or bee's knees) is a Prohibition era cocktail made with gin, fresh lemon juice, and honey. It is served shaken and chilled, often with a lemon twist.

The name comes from prohibition-era slang meaning "the best".

== History ==
The bee's knees cocktail has unclear origins. It was possibly invented by Frank Meier, an Austrian-born, part Jewish bartender who was the first head bartender at the Ritz in Paris in 1921, when its Cafe Parisian opened its doors.

A 1929 news article attributes the cocktail to Margaret Brown, an American socialite (the "Unsinkable" Molly Brown of Titanic fame).

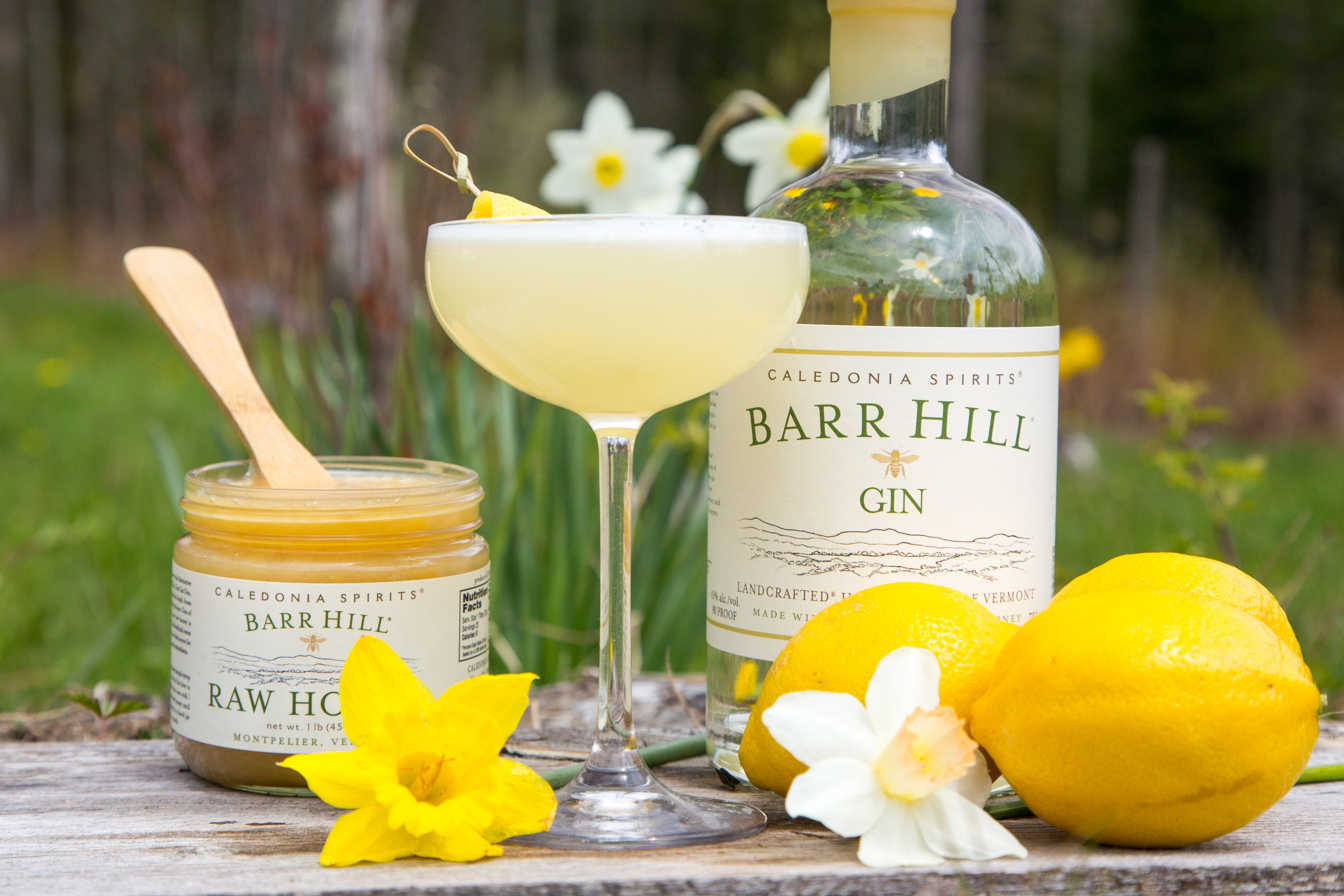
Bees knees cocktail with Barr Hill Gin, honey, and lemon

In 2017, Barr Hill Gin started an annual event called Bee's Knees Week to promote their product. Bee's Knees Week is the largest sustainability event in the spirits industry, focused on pollinator protection. A 2023 article published by The New York Times credited an increase in the cocktail's popularity in part to Bee's Knees Week.

== Variations ==
- Several different gin brands are variously recommended, among them Barr Hill's for its honey infusion.
- The honey may be diluted 1:1 with warm water to thin the consistency.
- The honey may be diluted 1:1 with simple syrup instead of water.
- A sprig of basil or thyme may be used for garnish instead of lemon peel.
- Some variations contain orange juice.
- Add two dashes of absinthe and two dashes of orange bitters to make a variation called the "oldest living Confederate widow".
