= Borovička =

Slovak alcoholic beverage flavoured with juniper berries

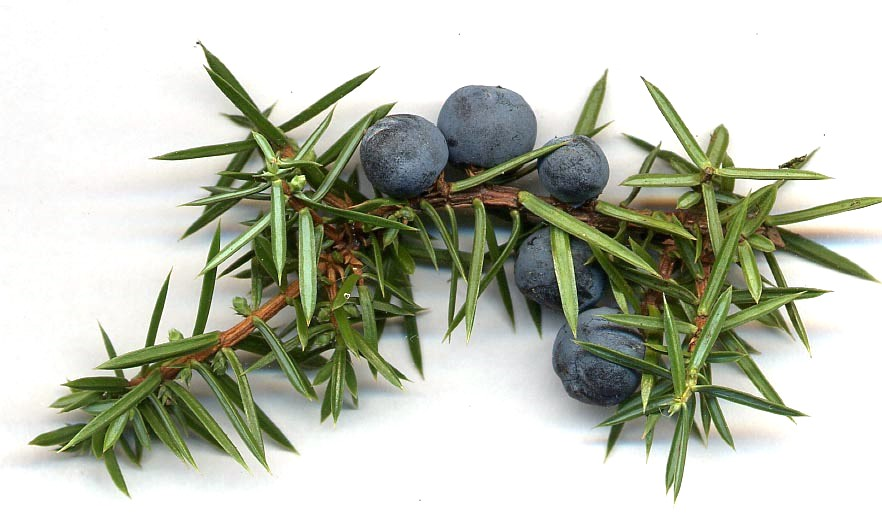
Juniper berries

Borovička (Slovak pronunciation: [ˈbɔrɔʋitʂka]; also known as Juniper brandy) is a Slovak alcoholic beverage flavoured with juniper berries. It is characterised by its clear or golden colour, and a taste similar to that of dry gin. It is especially popular in Slovakia and the Czech Republic.

Today's commercially produced borovička typically contains about 40% alcohol by volume or 80 proof, but can reach a0 to 70% alcohol content. As a benchmark, the minimum alcohol amount required by law in Slovakia is 35%. Its flavour, although much stronger, resembles that of gin. The production process consists of a two-stage distillation that in general uses only ripe berries from Juniperus communis and Juniperus oxycedrus.

Similar, but differently made drinks known in South Slavic countries include brinjevec in Slovenia (brin means juniper in Slovene) and klekovača in Serbia (kleka means juniper in Serbian). Other similar drinks include several types of gin, such as Jenever. International Juniper Brandy Day is celebrated annually on 24 June.

== History ==
According to The Dictionary of the Slovak Language, borovička derives its name from the Slovak word for juniper, borievka. Borovička harks back to the 16th century, when this beverage was produced in the Habsburg monarchy's county of Liptov, today part of central Slovakia. It was exported throughout the whole Habsburg monarchy, particularly to Vienna and Budapest. It was transported southward principally via rafts floating down the river Váh.

== Major brands ==
- St. Nicolaus (Slovakia)
- Frucona - Spišská Borovička (Slovakia)
- Frucona - Borovičkový destilát 55% (Slovakia)
- Gas Família - Spiš original borovička (Slovakia)
- Gas Família - Spišská borovička (Slovakia)
- Old Herold (Slovakia)
- Rudolf Jelínek (Czech Republic)

== Other ==
- Borovnička is a name for a liqueur made from blueberry in Croatia.

== References and footnotes ==
- https://www.robto.online/borovicka-destillate-only-in-slovakia/
