= Summerhall distillery =

Gin distillery in Edinburgh, Scotland

Summerhall Distillery

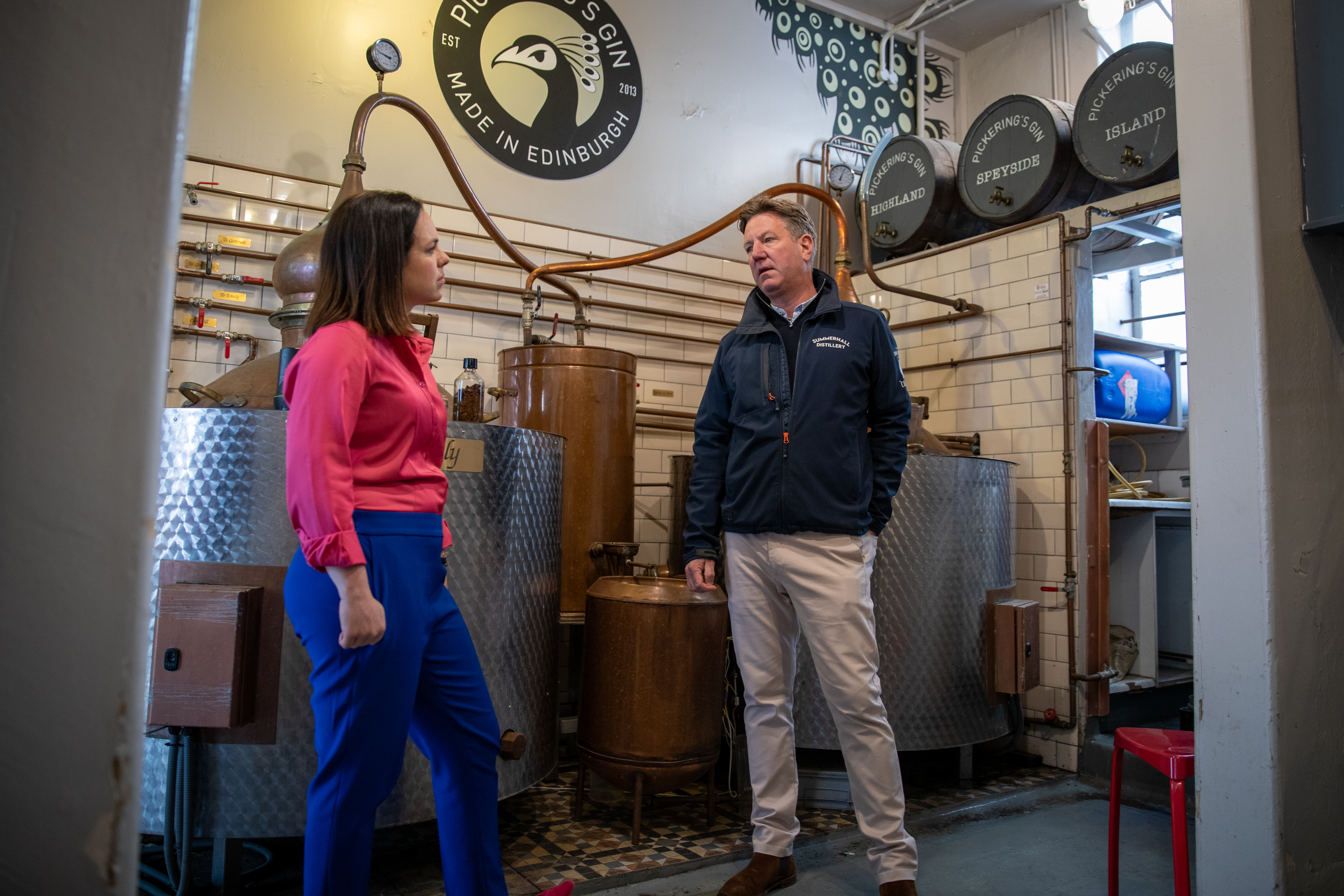
- Deputy First Minister Kate Forbes in the Summerhall distillery stillroom
- Location: Edinburgh, Scotland
- Coordinates: 55.9401°N 3.1815°W
- Owner: Summerhall Distillery Limited
- Founded: 2013; 13 years ago
- Founder: Matt Gammell; Marcus Pickering
- Status: Operational
- No. of stills: 2 pot stills; both 500 litre
- Website: summerhalldistillery.com

Listed Building – Category B
- Official name: Summerhall, The Royal (Dick) School Of Veterinary Studies
- Designated: 12 March 2002
- Reference no.: LB48536

Summerhall distillery is a gin distillery in Edinburgh, Scotland, located in the converted buildings of the University of Edinburgh's former veterinary school.

The distillery's best-known product is Pickering's Gin, a London Dry-style gin based on a recipe from India. The company has since released a large number of variations on the original Pickering's recipe, many using unusual botanicals, such as brussels sprouts. The distillery began to release Christmas baubles filled with gin in 2014, an innovation that received significant media attention.

== History ==
Summerhall distillery was established in 2013 by Matt Gammell and Marcus Pickering, inside the Summerhall arts complex. The complex was the original location of the Royal (Dick) School of Veterinary Studies, and had been sold to a private investor in 2011. The distillery is located in the former dog kennels.

Pickering had been involved in the conversion of the site from veterinary collage to hospitality venue, and had established the Barney's brewery there three years prior. Gemmell had previously been an engineer for glassware firm Edinburgh Crystal, and became head distiller at the new distillery.

By 2017, the distillery had gone from two staff to seven, and was exporting to 16 countries.

The distillery continued to have a dual purpose as an arts venue, and for the 2023 Edinburgh Fringe, the distillery hosted an interactive theatre event based on the history of the speakeasy. The distillery additionally became known for its use of distinctive novelty machines, including a gramophone that automatically mixed cocktails, and a converted Japanese fire engine that dispensed gin through its fire hoses.

In July 2025, the distillery began to distill Toradh Gin for the supermarket Aldi. Later that year, staff from the distillery were appointed to perform cask management at Royal Elizabeth Bond, a bonded warehouse in a former Victualling Yard in Dalmeny.

== Products ==
The distillery's main product is Pickering's Gin, named after co-founder Marcus Pickering. The gin is based on an recipe written in Mumbai (then Bombay) that is on display in the distillery, dated 1947. The recipe had been passed down to Pickering through a friend of his father. The gin uses 9 botanicals: juniper, coriander, cardamom, fennel, anise, angelica, lemon peel, lime peel and cloves.

Early variations in the Pickering's range included a 57% abv Navy Strength gin, a sloe gin, and five oak-aged gins themed around Scotland's whisky-making regions. The Navy Strength was distinguished with a miniature bearskin atop the bottle. A limited edition Pickering's gin was released for the Royal Edinburgh Military Tattoo in 2017, using heather, Scots pine, bog myrtle and milk thistle. This was the first Pickerings gin to use Scottish botanicals.

In 2017, three Pickering's bottlings based on the ships of the Cunard line were released. This was followed in 2019 by four Christmas bottlings, including a gin flavoured with brussels sprouts.

In 2014, the distillery first began to make baubles filled with gin, designed as Christmas tree decorations, to be sold at a Christmas fair at the distillery. Several thousand baubles were once again sold at Christmas fairs in 2015. In 2016, 30,000 baubles were made, utilising a custom bauble-filling machine supplied by Hacklab, an Edinburgh hackerspace. Coverage of the product went viral, and the product won "Innovation of the Year" at the Scottish Gin Awards.

The first whisky released by the distillery was The Broody Hen, a blended whisky, in 2022. This was followed by a limited bottling of blended whisky called 1505, released in partnership with the Surgeons Quarter. The name referred to the distilling concessions granted to The Royal College of Surgeons of Edinburgh in that year.

The distillery supplied hand santiser to key workers during the Covid-19 pandemic.
