= Catoctin Creek Distilling Company =

Distillery in Virginia, United States

Coordinates: 39°08′11.5″N 77°42′54″W

Catoctin Creek Distilling Company, LLC
- Type: Private
- Industry: Manufacturing of distilled spirits
- Founded: Purcellville, Virginia, 2009
- Founder: Scott and Rebecca Harris
- Headquarters: Purcellville, Virginia, United States
- Products: Distilled spirits
- Owner: Scott and Rebecca Harris
- Number of employees: 18
- Website: Official website

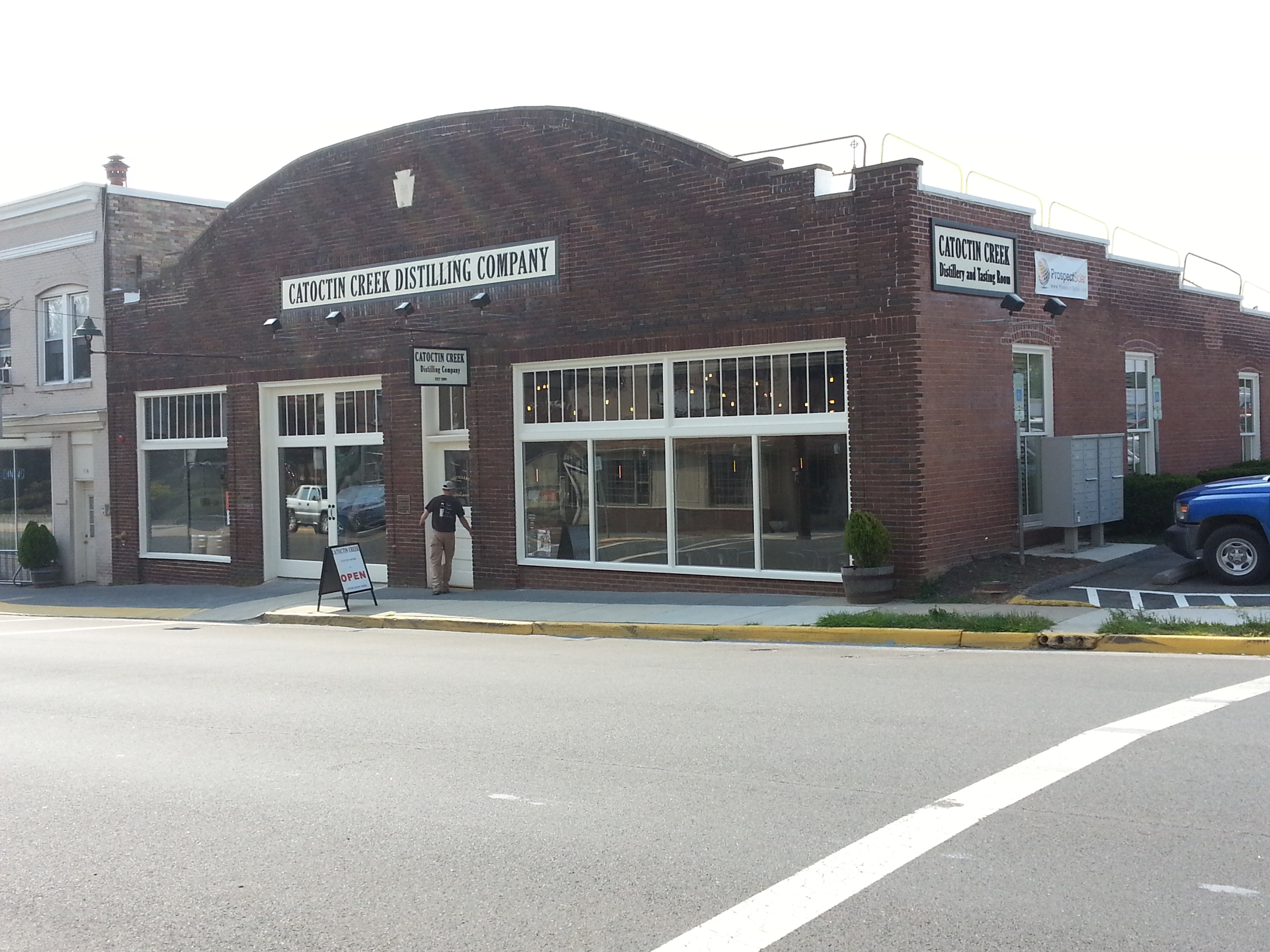
Catoctin Creek Distillery, at the historic Case Building in Old Town Purcellville, Virginia

The Catoctin Creek Distilling Company (/kəˈtɒktən/ kə-TOK-tən), which operates under the trade name of Catoctin Creek, is the first legal distillery in Loudoun County, Virginia, since prohibition. The distillery is a certified organic and kosher microdistillery in Purcellville, Virginia, that produces brandy, rye whiskey, and gin from local fruit, organic grain and Virginia wine.

== History ==
The distillery was founded in 2009 by Scott and Rebecca Harris using an SBA 7(a) loan for start-up capital. Initially, the company operated using custom-made 400 and 1200 liter Kothe hybrid pot-column stills.

In the 2011 session of the Virginia General Assembly, the company sought approval to sell its spirits at the distillery. Virginia Senate Bill 1249 passed both the Senate and the House of Delegates and was then signed by Governor Bob McDonnell on March 26, 2011, allowing direct bottle-sales to the public from the distillery. With the prior year's passage of 2010 House of Delegate Bill 952, the company now provides tastings at their distillery store, in a fashion similar to wineries within the state.

In 2012, the distillery purchased the historic Case Building (built 1921) on Main Street in Purcellville, and renovated the building as the home of their new distillery. Renovations included structural repair to the roof, complete electrical upgrade, new plumbing systems, fire sprinklers, a new tasting room, extensive masonry repair, and a 41kWh solar array.

In 2017, the distillery announced a new minority partner and investor, Constellation Brands of Victor, New York. In a company press release, Rebecca Harris, the co-founder and chief distiller, stated the reasoning behind the investment: "In order to expand our production and portfolio, we needed the right partner for the next level of growth. Constellation has a strong commitment to this category..." During this time, Scott and Rebecca Harris, the co-founders, remained the majority owners and managers of the business.

In 2021, the company upgraded their production equipment, tripling their capacity, including a new mash cooker, fermenters, and a 2000 liter Specific Engineering hybrid pot-column still, replacing the older 400 liter pot still. That same year, Catoctin Creek collaborated with the Virginia based heavy-metal band, Gwar to produce Ragnarök Rye, a limited-edition rye whiskey.

In a 2023 press release, the company states that it had re-purchased the shares from Constellation Brands, returning the company to full independent ownership, with Scott and Rebecca Harris maintaining control.

== COVID-19 pandemic ==
During the COVID-19 pandemic and a subsequent shortage on sanitizing products in March 2020, Catoctin Creek shifted most of its production operations to provide free sanitizing alcohol to over 100 families, six police stations, two emergency services, two hospitals, one senior center, and the FAA in Leesburg, Virginia. Instead of laying people off, management brought regional sales staff in to help on the production line, while working with elected officials to distribute bottles to organizations in need.

After producing, bottling and selling bulk hand sanitizer to first responders at the end of March, Catoctin Creek announced the release of their FDA approved 6 oz. hand sanitizer bottles to the general public in early April, which sold out in three weeks. Due to the lack of availability of raw materials to produce the sanitizer, their production of hand sanitizer ended in April 2020. In the end, Catoctin Creek made over 2,050 gallons of sanitizer available to the public, first responders, front-line workers and others in need. The craft distillery also raised and donated over $12,000 to local charities, including hospitality relief funds, clinics and food banks in Baltimore, Washington, DC, and Virginia. The distillery received a commendation from the Virginia Senate for their efforts during the pandemic, noting "through its decisive and selfless actions in the face of a historic public health emergency, Catoctin Creek Distilling Company has exemplified what makes the Commonwealth a wonderful place to live, work, and raise a family."

== Spirits produced ==
- Rye whiskey
- Brandy from grapes, pears, peaches, and apples.
- Gin

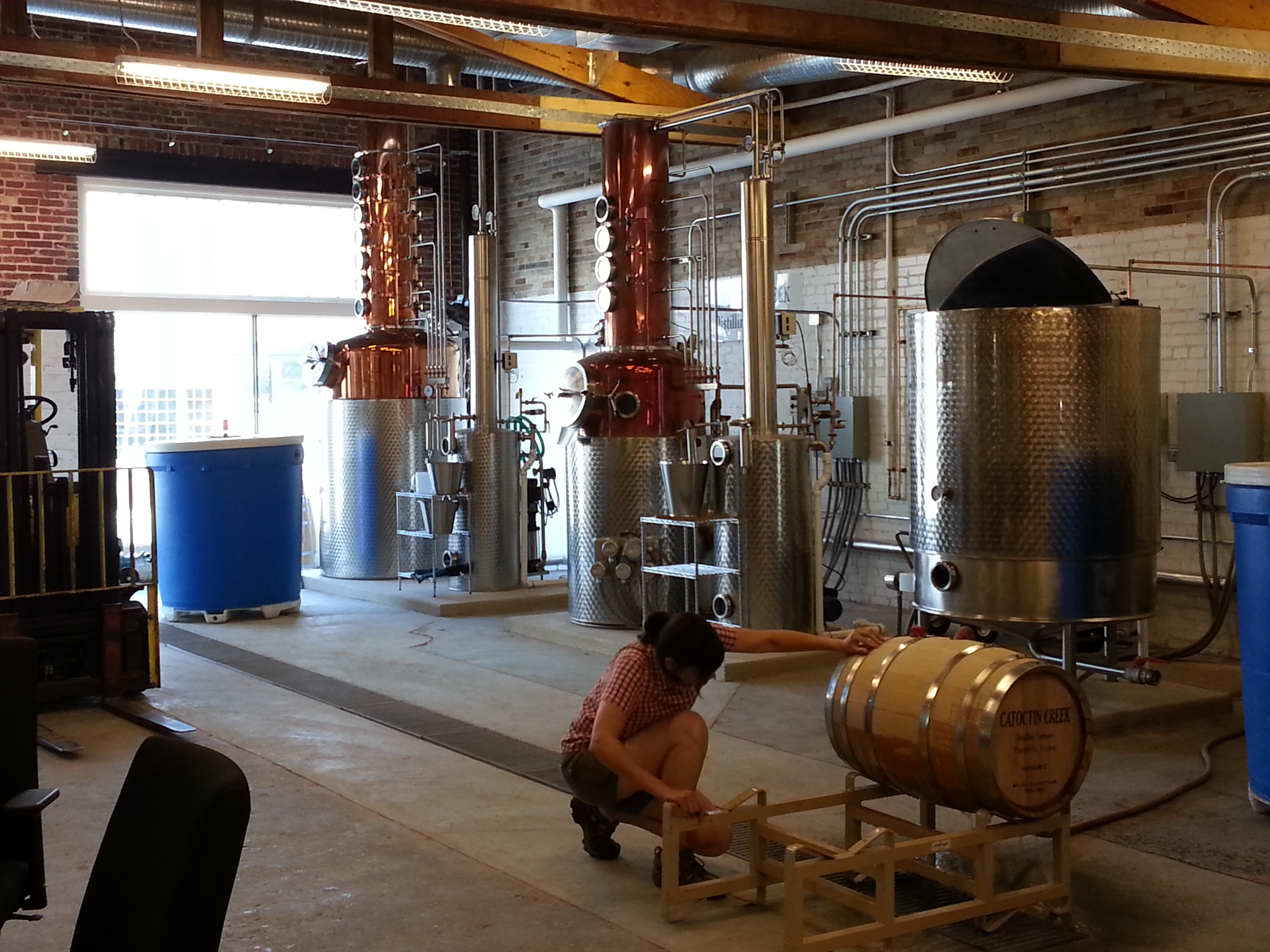
In 2013, the production equipment, including pot stills and mash cooker at Catoctin Creek Distillery

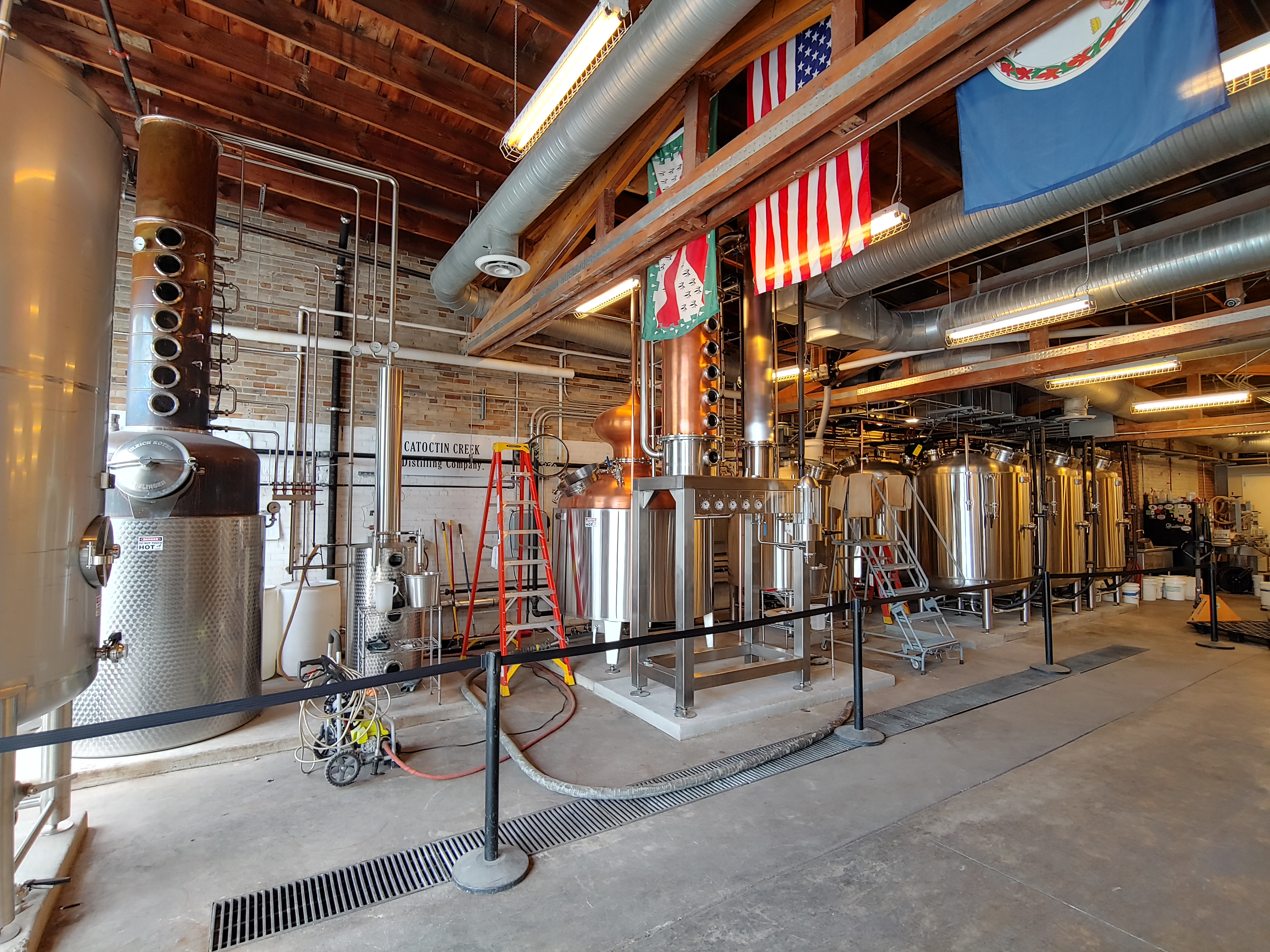
The upgraded production equipment at Catoctin Creek Distillery in 2021

== Awards ==
- Roundstone Rye
  - Double Gold medal for Cask Proof, San Francisco World Spirits Competition, 2017
  - Gold medal for Cask Proof, American Whiskey Masters, 2016
  - Gold medal for Cask Proof, Wizards of Whisky Awards, 2016
  - Gold medal for 92 Proof, New York World Wine and Spirits Competition, 2015
  - Gold medal for Cask Proof, Wizards of Whisky Awards, 2015
  - Silver medal for 92 Proof, San Francisco World Spirits Competition, 2015
  - Silver medal for 92 Proof, Wizards of Whisky Awards, 2015
  - Gold medal for rye whiskey, Artisan Awards, 2014
  - Gold medal for rye whiskey, The Fifty Best, 2014
  - Bronze medal, San Francisco World Spirits Competition, 2013
  - Bronze medal, American Distilling Institute, 2013
  - Gold seal, Good Food Awards, 2013
  - Gold medal for rye whiskey, The Fifty Best, 2012
  - Silver medal and best in category for aged rye whiskey, American Distilling Institute, 2011
  - Silver medal (87 - highly recommended) for rye whiskey, Beverage Testing Institute, 2011
  - Silver medal for aged craft distillery less than two years (less than $40), New York International Spirits Competition, 2010
- Mosby's Spirit
  - Bronze medal and best in category for un-aged rye whiskey, American Distilling Institute, 2011
  - Strong recommendation (87 - very good), American Whiskey, Ultimate Spirits Challenge, 2011
  - Silver medal (85 - highly recommended) for unaged whiskey, Beverage Testing Institute, 2011
  - Silver medal for unaged craft distillery (less than $40), New York International Spirits Competition, 2010
  - Bronze medal for unaged whiskey, American Distilling Institute, 2010
- Watershed Gin
  - Gold medal (91 - exceptional) for gin, Beverage Testing Institute, 2011
  - Silver medal for Gin, New York International Spirits Competition, 2011
- Regional Food and Beverage Producer - 2015 RAMMY Awards, Restaurant Association of Metropolitan Washington (RAMW)
- Virginia's Finest - Virginia Department of Agriculture and Consumer Services
- 2012 Small Business of the Year - Loudoun County Chamber of Commerce
- 2011 Entrepreneur of the Year and Rural Business of the Year - Loudoun County Chamber of Commerce
- Made in the South 2010 Awards - Garden and Gun magazine

== Distribution ==
Catoctin Creek is distributed in the United States in the following states:

- Arizona
- California
- Connecticut
- Delaware
- District of Columbia
- Florida
- Georgia
- Idaho
- Illinois
- Kentucky
- Maryland
- Massachusetts
- Michigan
- Minnesota
- Missouri
- Nevada
- New Jersey
- New Mexico
- New York
- Pennsylvania
- South Carolina
- Tennessee
- Texas
- Virginia
- Washington
- Wyoming

Catoctin Creek is distributed internationally in:

- Europe
- Mexico
- Singapore
