= Downslope Distilling =

Distillery in Colorado, United States

Coordinates: 39°35′40″N 104°49′1″W

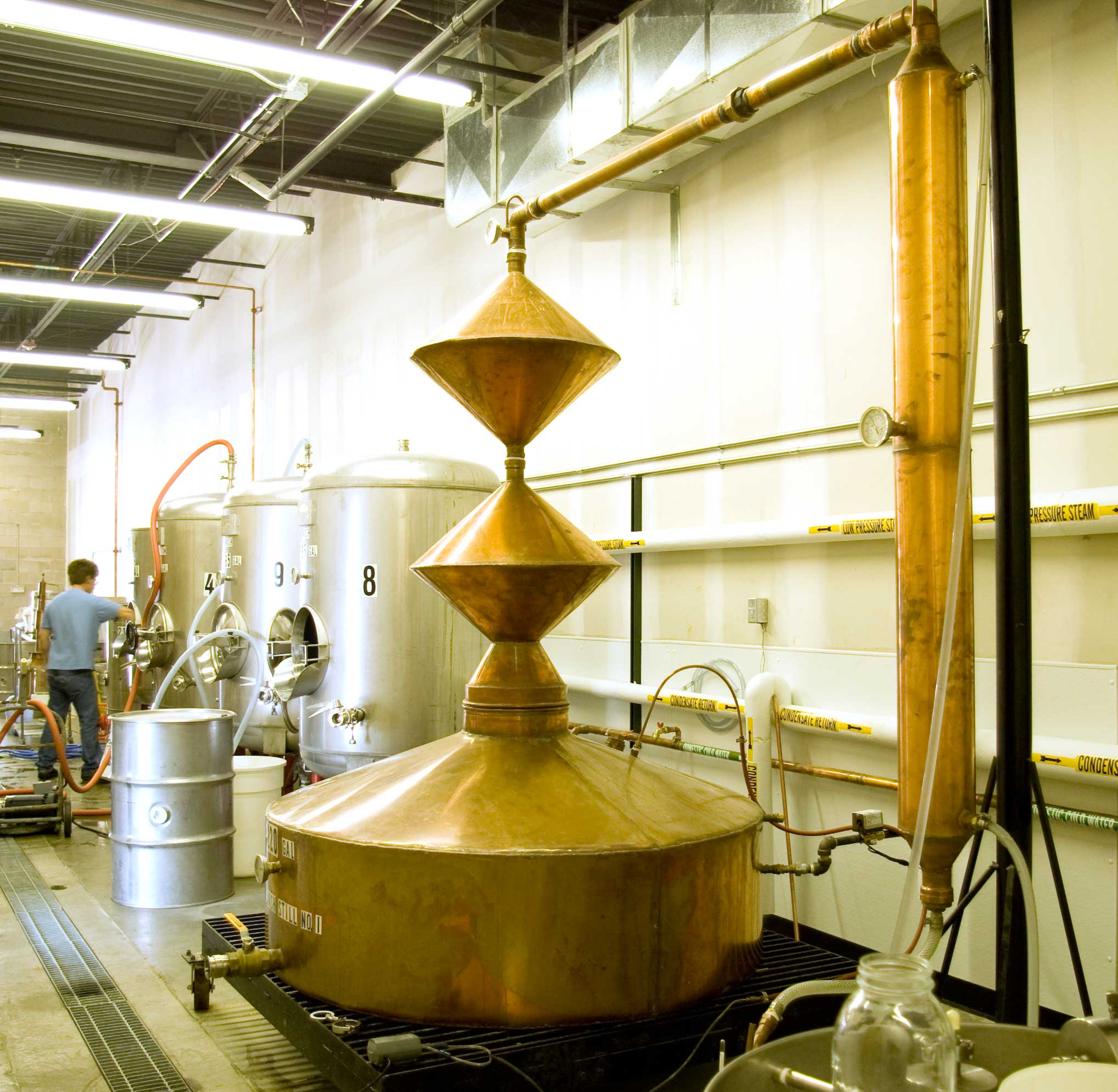
The Double Diamond pot still used by Downslope Distilling.

Downslope Distilling is a craft beverage distillery in Centennial, Colorado, United States. It was incorporated in 2008 and produces spirits including vodka, rum, and whiskey.

== Craft distilling movement ==
Until recently nearly all beverage distillation was a result of very large operations. The reason for this consolidation was the heavy administrative burden involved in the collection of excise taxes by the United States Treasury Department through the Alcohol and Tobacco Tax and Trade Bureau (Formerly Bureau of Alcohol, Tobacco, Firearms and Explosives). As a result of several simplifications to the excise regulations and the reduction of required Surety Bonds for small beverage alcohol producers, a number of small craft distilleries began opening with an emphasis on unique and handcrafted beverage spirits. In Colorado there has been a particular interest: in 2000 there were no licensed distilleries in the state today there are 14 licensed distilleries of which Downslope Distilling is one. Craft distilleries distinguish themselves from the large distilleries by creating niche products with unique properties that distinguish them in the marketplace.

== History ==
Downslope Distilling, Inc. was incorporated on May 12, 2008, in the state of Colorado for the purpose of Producing and selling beverage spirits including vodka, rum, and whiskey. The company received its state manufacturers license on February 24, 2009, and Federal Basic Permit to engage in the business of producing distilled spirits on March 4, 2009. The first products sold were a vodka made from sugar cane and a white rum in August 2009.

Downslope Distilling
- Industry: Distilled beverages
- Products: Rums; Vodkas; Whiskeys
- Website: http://www.Downslopedistilling.com/

== Principals ==
=== Mitchell Abate ===
Primary function is distillation of spirits. Such distillation is done on a 220-US-gallon (830 L) Double Diamond pot still made by Copper Moonshine Stills in Arkansas by Colonel Vaughn Wilson and a vodka still of his own design. He also is responsible for cellaring and filtration on an apparatus of his design dubbed the lichtenstein.

=== Andrew Causey ===
Business manager of the distillery and president of the company

=== Matthew Causey ===
Primarily engaged in the conversion of raw ingredients into a fermented wash for distillation.

== Products ==
=== White rum ===
Made from the dried juice of sugar cane harvested on Maui, Hawaii. The rum is fermented in 300-US-gallon (1,100 L) batches and distilled twice through the Double Diamond pot still. The product of this distillation is then filtered through the lichtenstein. The final product is packaged at 80 proof (40% alcohol).

=== Gold ===
Made from the same base ingredients as the white rum and run through the Double Diamond pot still twice. Instead of proceeding to filtration, it is instead aged in small, medium toast American white oak barrels. The resulting product absorbs flavor and a light gold color from the barrels. The final product is packaged at 80 proof (40% alcohol).

=== Wine barrel aged rum ===
Made from the same base ingredients as the white rum and run through the Double Diamond pot still twice. Instead of proceeding to filtration, it is instead aged in recently decanted red wine casks of differing varietals. Each barrel is individually aged (not blended.)The resulting barrels are each unique in flavor and have a slight pink hue to the otherwise gold color. The Rum is packaged at 80 proof (40% alcohol) and each bottle references the barrel and bottle number.

=== Vanilla Rum ===
Made from the same ingredients and in the same manner as the White Rum but infused with a proprietary blend of Tahiti and bourbon vanilla beans. The infusion is limited to 3 hours and each bottle has the equivalent of 1 1/2 beans. The final product is packaged at 80 proof (40% alcohol).

=== Vodka from grain ===
Made from malted barley and rye. the wash is fermented to terminal specific gravity and then run through the Double Diamond pot still once. The product of the pot still is then further distilled in the vodka column still to a proof of 190. It is then diluted and filtered through the Liechtenstein filter. The vodka is packaged at 80 proof (40% alcohol).

=== Vodka from cane ===
Made from the dried juice of sugar cane from Maui. the wash is fermented to terminal specific gravity and then run through the Double Diamond pot still once. The product of the pot still is then further distilled in the vodka distillation column still to a proof of 190. It is then diluted and filtered through the lichtenstein filter. The vodka is packaged at 80 proof (40% alcohol). The final product is a gluten free vodka.

=== Pepper vodka ===
Made from the same base ingredients and in the same manner as the Cane Vodka but infused first with dried New Mexico red chilis and then with Indonesian black pepper. The resulting product has a slight red hue and bitter taste. The vodka is packaged at 80 proof (40% alcohol).

=== Double Diamond whiskey ===
Made from floor malted barley and rye. The whiskey is fermented to a lower terminal specific gravity to preserve delicate grain flavors and then distilled twice through the Double Diamond pot still in the manner of Scotch whisky. The resulting spirit is then aged first in recently decanted red wine barrels and then finished in very small medium toast American white oak barrels. The resulting whiskey is light gold in color and has a flavor profile that bears some similarity to better Irish Whiskey. The whiskey is packaged at 80 proof (40% alcohol).
