= Sipsmith =

Microdistillery in London, England

Coordinates: 51°29′53″N 0°14′01″W

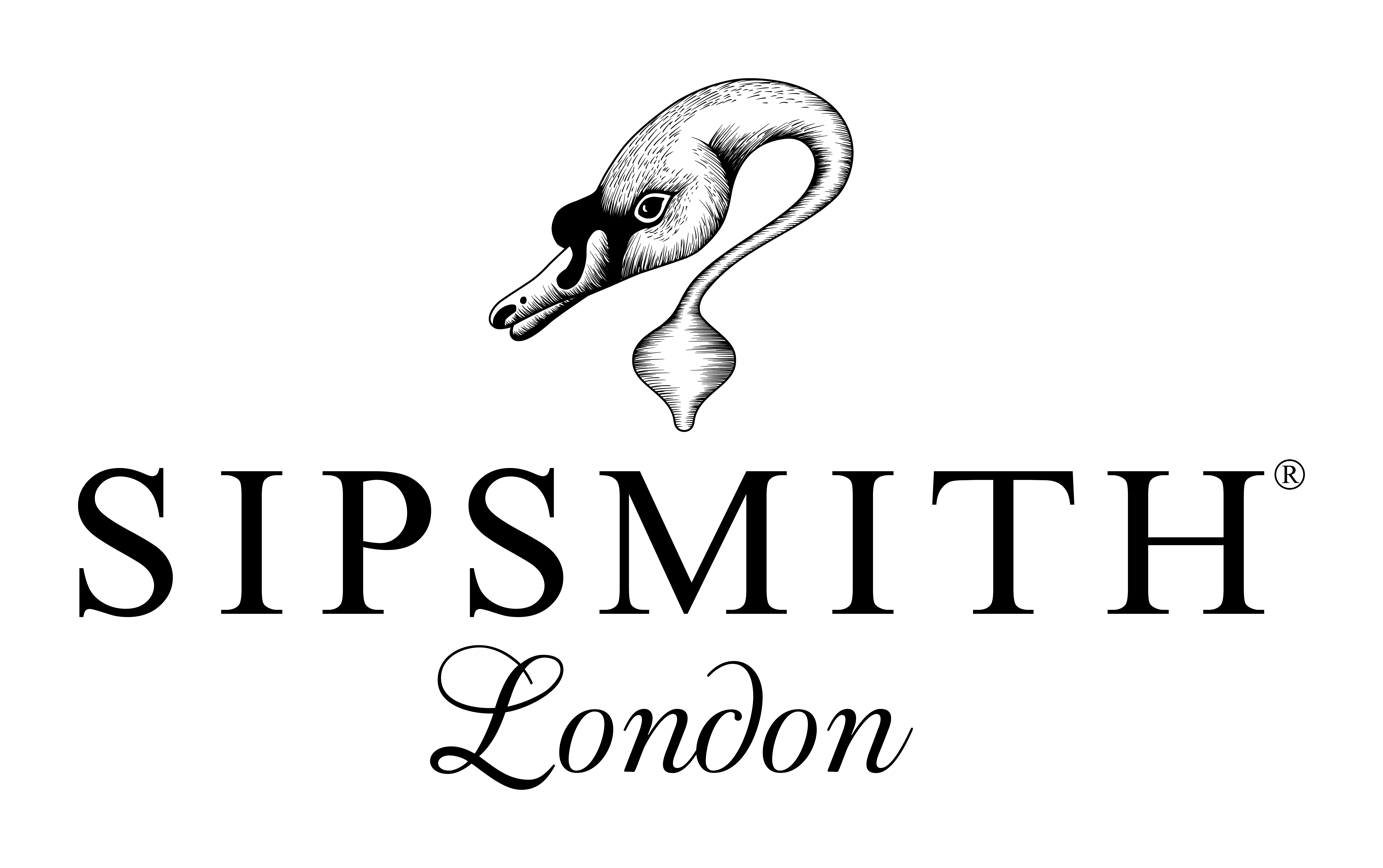
- Industry: Distilled beverage
- Founded: 2009
- Headquarters: London, UK
- Key people: Sam Galsworthy, Fairfax Hall & Jared Brown
- Products: Gin, Vodka
- Owner: Suntory Global Spirits
- Website: Sipsmith.com

Sipsmith is a microdistillery located in London. It is the first copper-pot distillery to open within Greater London' in nearly two centuries. It has been owned by Suntory Global Spirits, a subsidiary of Suntory Holdings of Osaka, Japan, since December 2016.

The Sipsmith Gin distillery is one of 24 gin distilleries located in London.

== History ==
Sipsmith was established in London in 2009, the first copper-pot based distillery to start up in London in 189 years and at the time, was one of only four gin distilleries located in London. Sipsmith was launched by Sam Galsworthy and Fairfax Hall, respectively former Fuller's and Diageo employees and Jared Brown, who is also Sipsmith's Master Distiller. A drinks and spirits historian and publisher, he has developed spirits in Sweden, Norway, Vietnam, and in the US over the past 12 years.

The Sipsmith still was designed and produced by the German still manufacturers Christian Carl. Named "Prudence", this copper pot still has a capacity of 300 litres (66 imp gal; 79 US gal). Prudence is the subject of their iconic swan neck copper still labelling, created alongside their visual identity and brand by Perry Haydn Taylor's agency, big fish, before Sipsmith was started. On 16 December 2016 it was announced that Beam Suntory had taken a controlling stake in Sipsmith for an estimated £50 million, but that Sam Galsworthy, Fairfax Hall and Jared Brown would be staying on to lead the distillery.

In May 2017, Sipsmith partnered with the secret London culinary boutique Gingerline to create an "immersive gin dinner".

In March 2019, Sipsmith launched its first TV advertising campaign. Julian Barratt voiced Mr. Swan in the stop-motion advert.

== Activities ==
The Sipsmith distillery is situated on a residential street in West London on the site of a former microbrewery, later the offices of beer hunter Michael Jackson.

Sipsmith's first two spirits are a Barley Vodka and a London Dry Gin. These are produced in small batches of fewer than 300 bottles, from an English Barley mash that is created off-site. Each batch is made in a traditional manner with three cuts: the Head or foreshot is discarded; the Heart or core of the distillation run is retained; and the Tail or feints is discarded. The Heart of the distillation is diluted to its final bottling strength with Lydwell Spring water, one of the sources of the River Thames in the Cotswolds.

== Products ==
- Sipsmith London Dry Gin (41.6% ABV): A classic London dry style gin, it uses 10 botanicals in its maceration: Juniper berries, Coriander Seed, Angelica Root, Liquorice Root, Orris Root, Ground Almond, Cassia Bark, Cinnamon, Orange Peel and Lemon Peel.
- Sipsmith Sipping Vodka (40% ABV): An unfiltered and unsweetened wheat vodka, the spirit derives its flavour from its essential grain base.
- Sipsmith Sloe Gin (29% ABV): released in October 2010
- Sipsmith London Cup (29% ABV): a type of fruit cup with Lemon Verbena, Rose petals, Borage and Earl grey released in August 2011
- Sipsmith Damson Vodka (28% ABV): released in 2010
- Sipsmith VJOP (57.7% ABV): 'Very Junipery Over Proof'
- Sipsmith Lemon Drizzle with fresh vapour infused Lemon peels and Lemon Verbena
- Sipsmith zesty Orange distilled with Bergamot and infused with fresh Orange peel
- Sipsmith Orange and Cacao is infused with Orange peel and Cocoa bean
- Sipsmith Chili and Lime gin with fresh Lime and 7 Chili varieties
- Sipsmith Strawberry smash distillet with mint and Strawberrys

In 2015, to commemorate the 100th anniversary of the Singapore Sling, Sipsmith partnered with Raffles Hotels & Resorts to create a brand-made gin, the Raffles 1915 Gin.

== Awards ==
The distillery won the 2010 Observer Food Monthly Award for Best Newcomer.
