= Microdistillery =

Small, often boutique-style distillery

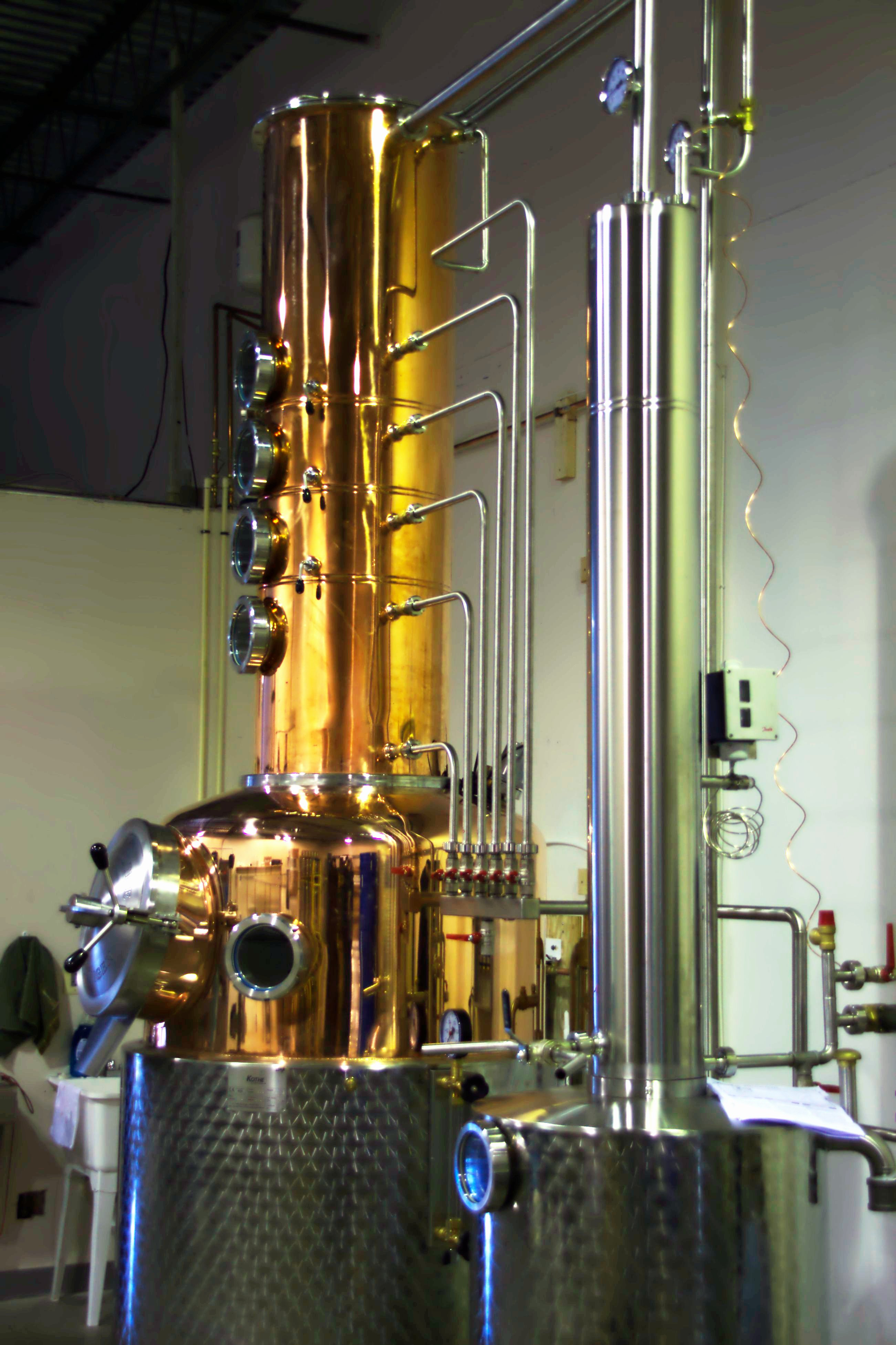
A custom-made 400-liter Kothe hybrid pot-column still operated by the Catoctin Creek Distilling Co. of Purcellville, Virginia.

A microdistillery is a small, often boutique-style distillery established to produce beverage grade spirit alcohol in relatively small quantities, usually done in single batches (as opposed to larger distillers' continuous distilling process). While the term is most commonly used in the United States, micro-distilleries have been established in Europe for many years, either as small cognac distilleries supplying the larger cognac houses, or as distilleries of single malt whisky originally produced for the blended Scotch whisky market, but whose products are now sold as niche single malt brands. The more recent development of micro-distilleries can now also be seen in locations as diverse as London, Switzerland, and South Africa.

Throughout much of the world, small distilleries operate in communities of various sizes, often without being given a distinct classification. Due to the extended period of Prohibition in the United States, however, most small distillers were forced out of business, leaving only the corporate-dominated megadistilleries to resume operation when Prohibition was repealed to produce small batch brands. Most microdistilleries in South Africa ceased to exist when legislation was introduced in 1964 that made it almost impossible for small, private distilleries to operate viably. The legislation was relaxed again in 2003 and although most distilling expertise was lost, it was recovered by a new generation of microdistillers and has grown since.

A recent trend in this segment of the distilling industry is for megadistillers to create their own micro-distillery within their current operation. The Makers Mark distillery is owned by Suntory and the Buffalo Trace distillery is owned by The Sazerac Company (which also owns the A. Smith Bowman microdistillery) are now producing specialty bourbon brands with small stills.

== Movement ==
The modern microdistilling movement grew out of the beer microbrewing trend, which originated in the United Kingdom in the 1970s and quickly spread throughout the United States in the following decades. While still in its infancy, the popularity of microdistilling and microdistilled spirits is expanding consistently, with many microbreweries and small wineries establishing distilleries within the scope of their brewing or winemaking operations. Other microdistilleries are farm-based. Anchor Brewing Company, Ballast Point Brewing Company, and Dogfish Head are examples of American craft breweries that have begun expanding into microdistillation. Leopold Bros. is an example of a microdistiller that began as a microbrewery, and now operates as a distillery alone.

Some of the newer microdistilleries produce only spirits. Plain and seasonally-flavored vodkas are popular products. As with the emergence of microbreweries, California and Oregon have experienced the highest number of microdistillery openings. Significant recent growth has also occurred in the Midwest. Microdistilleries for gin and vodka have also now started to re-emerge in London, England, after being restricted and effectively banned for over a hundred years due to UK government restrictions on still sizes, which have now been partially relaxed. There are now five licensed distilleries in London: Beefeater, and Thames Distillers, and four microdistilleries: the City of London Distillery, The London Distillery Company, Sacred Microdistillery and Sipsmith. At the same time, European micro-distilleries have been a key element in the absinthe renaissance in several countries, including Switzerland.

South Africa has experienced relatively big growth in microdistilleries and produces mainly pot-distilled brandies, fruit brandies, fruit-based eau de vie (locally called mampoer), husk-based spirits (like Italian Grappa), and a wide range of liqueurs and flavoured vodkas. Distillique is one of the few training academies worldwide which provides craft and microdistiller training courses on a regular monthly basis for microdistillers. South African microdistillers include Jorgensen's Distillery, Dalla Cia Distillery, Nyati JJJ Distillery, Schoemanati Distillery, Tanagra Distillery and Wilderer Distillery.

In the 1990s, the liquor industry established the notion of super premium spirits offering a higher-quality (and usually more elaborately packaged) product at a higher price. The higher prices created an opportunity for small distilleries to profitably produce niche brands of exotic spirits. The early 21st Century saw the creation of hundreds of such distilleries producing products that were designed and marketed in a way that resembled celebrated restaurants more than alcoholic spirits marketing. The growth of craft distilleries and breweries was partly driven by consumer interest in greater variety, perceived quality, and support for locally owned businesses.

According to the American Distilling Institute, there were 50 microdistilleries operating in the United States in 2005, but by 2012 this number had increased to 250. Numerous competitions and publications were formed to support the burgeoning sub-culture of spirits. By 2019, there were over 2,000 microdistilleries in the United States, and the market share of craft spirits was steadily growing.

It is no longer the case that microdistilleries are producing at the premium end of the market only; the established brands are under threat from local microdistilleries at all price points (with the possible exception of the ultra discount supermarket brands such as Sainsbury's and Tesco's "value" brands, which are close to loss leaders).

The COVID-19 pandemic negatively impacted the microdistillery industry, as bars and pubs closed, and the economy shrank.[17] Many distilleries responded by temporarily pivoting to the production of hand sanitizer to offset losses and meet public demand. This marked a sharp downturn in the previously steady growth of microdistilleries in the United States, in a phenomenon compared to the impact of Prohibition.[18]

== Innovation ==
Microdistillers often experiment with new techniques to produce new flavors. Tony Conigliaro uses a rotavap (i.e. glassware not copper pot) on a small scale to produce distilled spirits which change from day to day in his bar, and Ian Hart uses vacuum equipment to conduct distillation at much-reduced temperatures, resulting in less cooked aromatics.

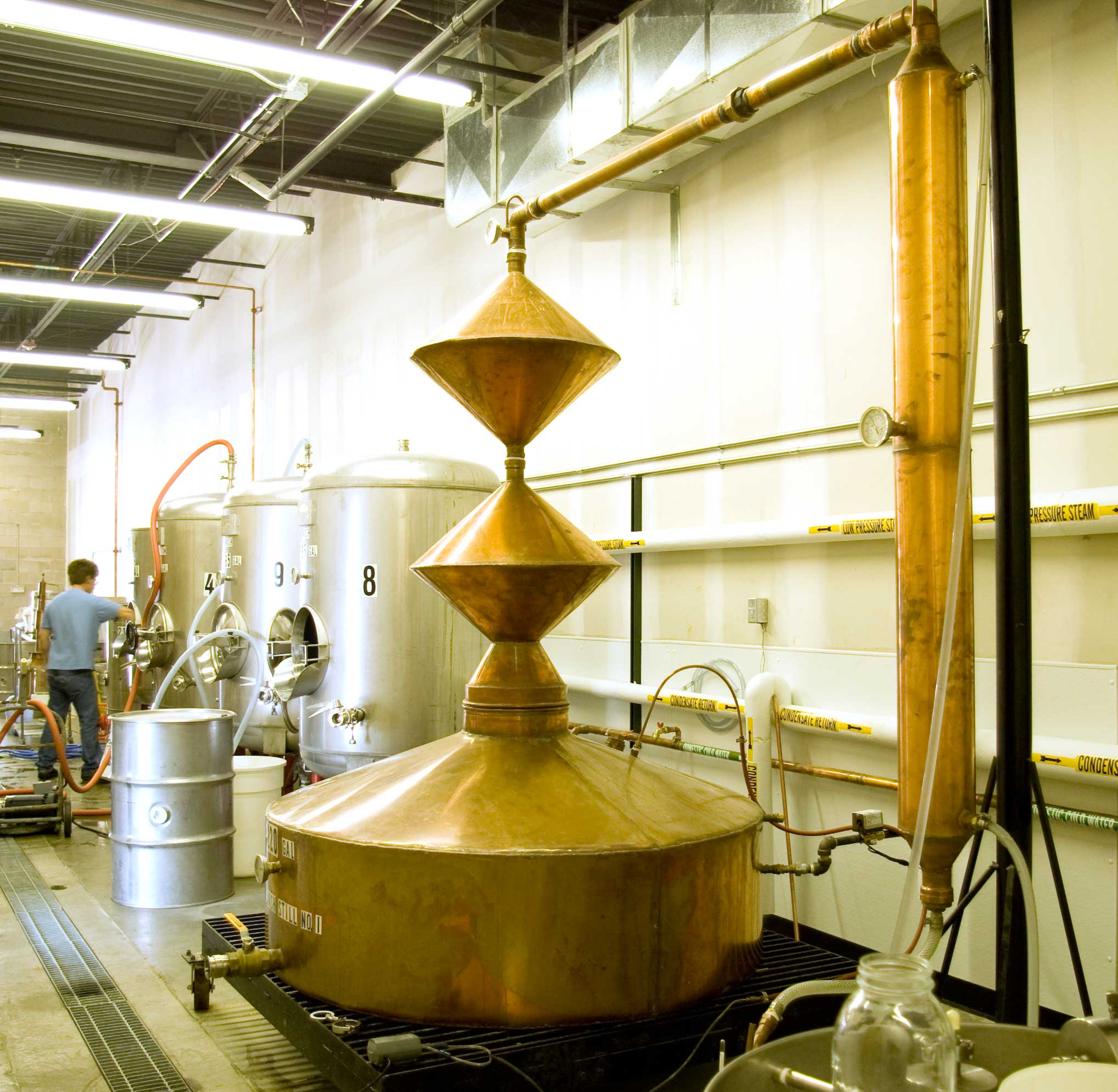
A Double Diamond pot still used by Downslope Distilling of Centennial, Colorado.

== U.S. regulation ==
The U.S. Government regulates distilleries to a high degree and currently does not distinguish its treatment of distilleries in terms of size. This stringent regulation has prevented microdistilling from developing as rapidly as microbrewing which enjoys relatively more relaxed government control. A number of states, such as California, Illinois, Indiana, Iowa, Kansas, Michigan, Utah, Washington, West Virginia, and Wisconsin have passed legislation reducing the stringent regulations for small distilleries that were a holdover from prohibition. The Bureau of Alcohol, Tobacco, and Firearms (BATF) and the Alcohol and Tobacco Tax and Trade Bureau (TTB) are responsible for enforcing Federal statutes as they apply to all manufacturers of beverage alcohol.

== South African regulations ==
In South Africa, microdistilleries are legally defined as distilleries with an annual capacity of fewer than 2 million litres of spirits. These microdistilleries are regulated through provincial laws rather than the national liquor laws (as prescribed in the Liquor Act of South Africa, Act 59 of 2003).

== Craft distillery ==
The American Craft Spirits Association defines a "craft distillery" as a distillery that produces fewer than 750,000 gallons per year; is independently owned and operated (with a greater than 75% equity stake, plus operational control), and is transparent regarding its ingredients, its distilling and bottling location; its distilling and bottling process, and its aging process.

== See also ==
- Distillation
- Microbrewery
- Portland Oregon Distilleries
- Third wave of coffee
