= Wacholder =

Wacholder is the German word for juniper and is also a term to describe juniper-flavored schnaps, which can be considered a regional varietys of gin. It is produced predominantly in Westphalia, Emsland, Lippe, and the Rhineland. One of the oldest operating Wacholder distilleries is the Brennerei Eversbusch in Hagen, founded in the 18th century.

In Austria and regions of Bavaria, Wacholder is referred to as Kranewitter, which is a regional term for the juniper plant. In Germany, Wacholder spirit can be used as an umbrella term for all juniper-flavored spirits such as Genever, Gin, Köm, Kranewitter, Krambambuli, and Steinhäger. A similar beverage, Borovička, is popular in Slovakia and the Czech Republic.

It is strong-flavored owing to its method of distillation, and is traditionally served chilled as a neat shot, with a beer chaser.
