= Angela McShane =

Angela McShane is a senior research fellow and Head of Renaissance and Early Modern Studies at the Victoria and Albert Museum, the V&A/Sheffield University Research and External Engagement Fellow, and an Associate Fellow of Early Modern History at Warwick University.

In December 2016 McShane was on the expert panel for BBC Radio 4's In Our Time on the Gin Craze.

== Selected publications ==
- McShane, Angela; Walker, Garthine (2010), The Extraordinary and the Everyday in Early Modern England: Essays in Celebration of the Work of Bernard Capp, Houndmills, Basingstoke, Hampshire: Palgrave Macmillan, ISBN 978-1-81604-250-7
- McShane, Angela (2011), "Introduction", in Medlam, Sarah; Miller, Lesley Ellis (eds.), Princely Treasures: European Masterpieces 1600-1800, from the Victoria and Albert Museum, V & A Publishing, ISBN 978-1-85177-633-7
- McShane, Angela (2011), Political Broadside Ballads of Seventeenth-Century England: A Critical Bibliography, London: Routledge, ISBN 978-1-84893-014-8
- Withington, Phil; McShane, Angela (2014), Cultures of Intoxication, Past and present Supplements, v. 9, Oxford University Press, ISBN 978-0-19-871562-7
