= Roberson Wine =

London fine wine merchant

Coordinates: 51°29′50″N 0°12′19″W

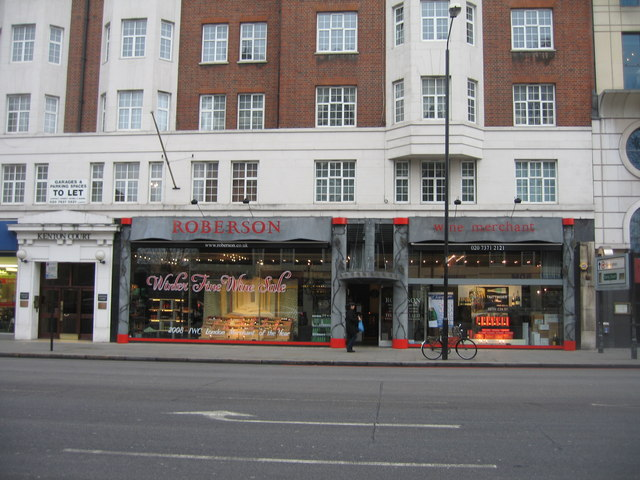
Roberson Wine Merchants Kensington High Street.

Roberson Wine is an online fine wine merchant based in London.

Established in 1991, Roberson Wine specialises in wines from France and California, selling online to private individuals and wholesale to restaurants and off-trade businesses. It holds regular tastings of fine wine in its Earls Court premises. Roberson Wine closed its Kensington Store at the end of August 2015 and now operates entirely out of its offices in Earls Court. It is situated above central London's only working winery, London Cru, also founded by Cliff Roberson, owner of Roberson Wine.

== Recognition ==
Roberson Wine was named "Small Independent of the Year" and "Specialist Merchant of the Year: California" in 2014 at the International Wine Challenge. In 2009 Jancis Robinson nominated Mark Andrew of Roberson and Gareth Birchley of Bordeaux Index as "destined for great things". In 2015, it was named "Specialist Merchant of the Year: California" and "Innovator of the Year", again at the International Wine Challenge.
