= Punch (drink) =

Drink containing fruit or fruit juice

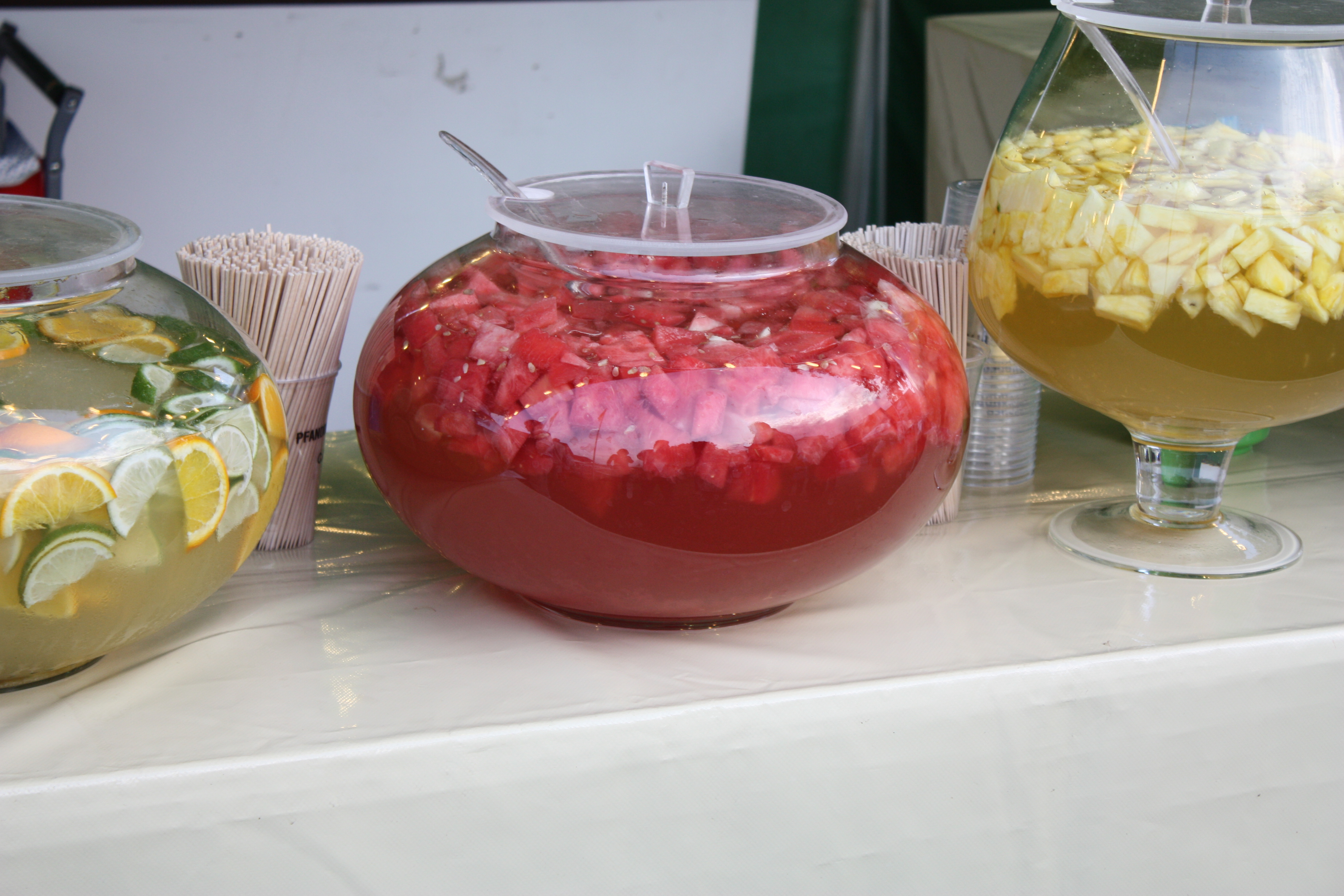
- German bowle
- Type: Cocktail family
- Ingredients: Usually fruit juices and other drink mixers, optionally with alcohol
- Standard drinkware: Mug
- Preparation: Varied

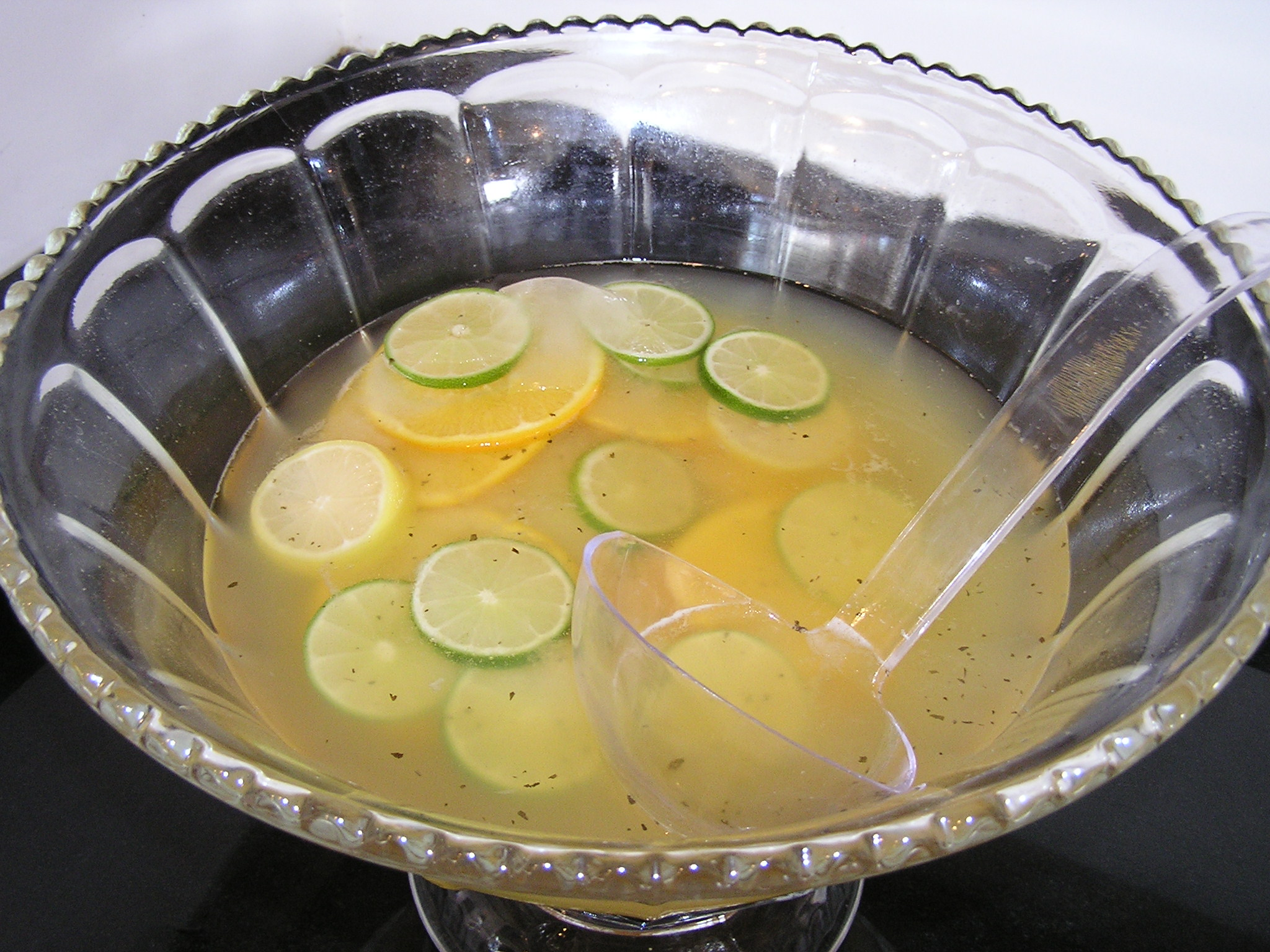
Southern Bourbon Punch

The term punch refers to a wide assortment of drinks, both alcoholic and non-alcoholic, generally containing fruits or fruit juice. The drink was introduced from the Indian subcontinent to England by employees of the East India Company in the late 17th century. Punch is usually served at parties in large, wide bowls, known as punch bowls.

In the United States, federal regulations provide the word "punch" to describe commercial beverage products that do not contain fruit or fruit juice. The term is used to label artificially flavored beverages, with or without natural flavorings, which do not contain fruit juice or concentrate in significant proportions. Thus a product labeled as "fruit punch" may contain no fruit ingredients at all.

== Etymology ==
The word is commonly said to come from Hindi पाँच (pāñch), meaning "five", as the drink was frequently made with five ingredients: alcohol, sugar, juice from either a lime or a lemon, water, and spices, or milk, curd, butter, honey, sugar (a combination used in the religious offering panchamrita common in religious ceremonies on the Indian subcontinent). That etymology traces to John Fryer's A New Account of East India and Persia, in Eight Letters (1698). However, the English word "punch" itself is now known to have been in use before the British became regulars to India, albeit with a different meaning.

Some think the word originates from the English puncheon, which was a volumetric description for certain sized barrels used to transport alcohol on ships.

== History ==
The drink was introduced from the Indian subcontinent to England by employees of the East India Company in the late 17th century. From there it was introduced into other European countries. When served communally, the drink is expected to be of a lower alcohol content than a typical cocktail.

The term punch was first recorded in English documents in 1632. At the time, most punches were of the wassail type made with a wine or brandy base. But around 1655, Jamaican-produced rum came into use, and the "modern" punch emerged. By 1671, documents make references to punch houses.

As the need for a single-serving punch became evident, the sling, composed of spirits, water, and a sweetener, was invented.

== Variations ==
=== Non-alcoholic ===
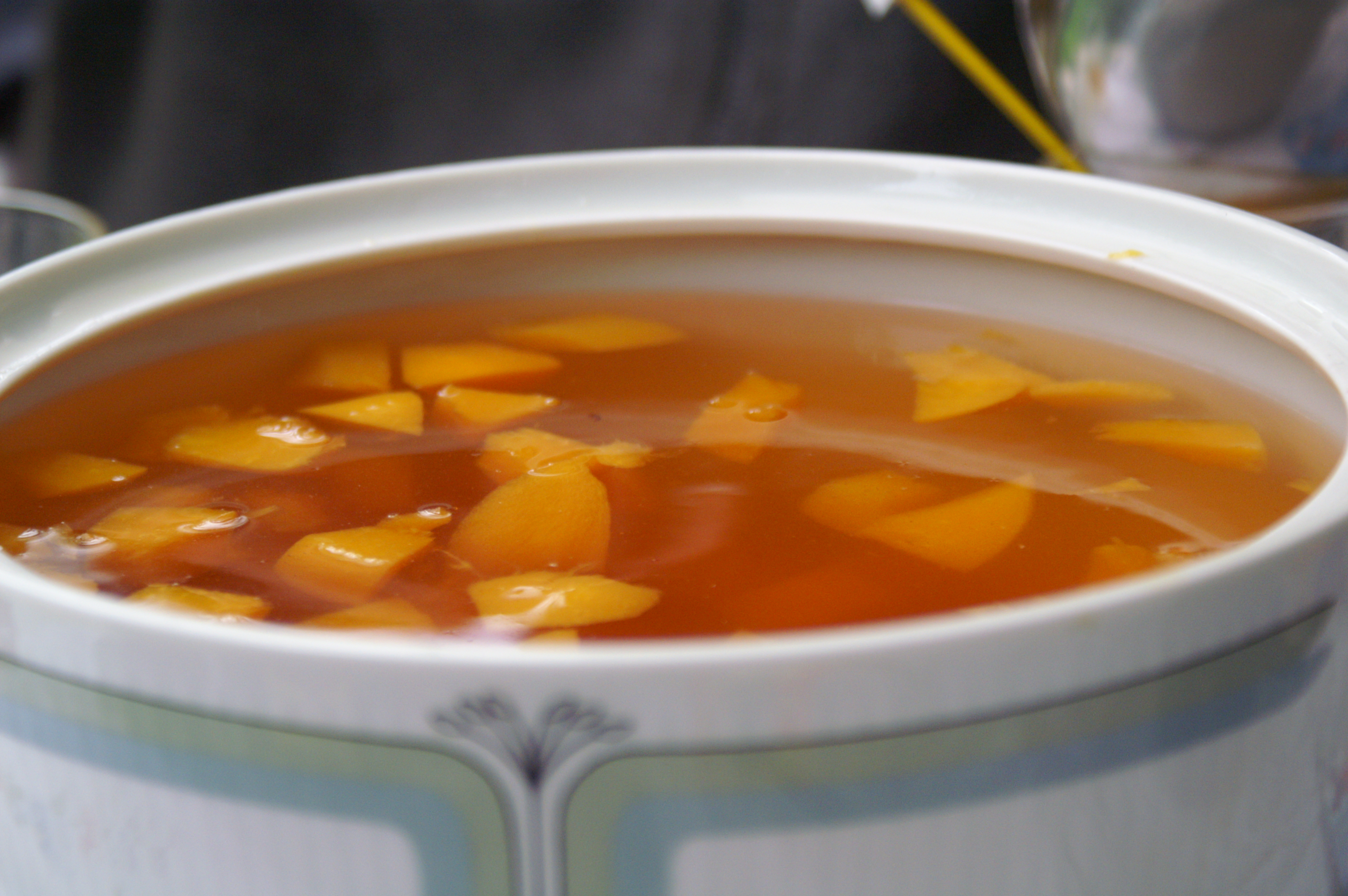
Fruit punch

Non-alcoholic varieties, which are especially given to children, as well as adults who do not drink alcohol, typically include a mix of fruit juice, water, and a sweetener, such as sugar or honey. Lemon-lime soda, ginger ale, or other fruit-flavored carbonated sodas are often added. It also often contains slices or chunks of actual fruit, such as oranges and pineapple. The non-alcoholic versions are typically served at school dances, church functions, picnics, and other similar social occasions.

Commercial manufacturers distribute many types of "fruit punch" beverages. These are usually colored red. Despite the name, most brands contain only a small fraction of actual fruit juice; the major constituents are typically sugar or corn syrup, citric acid, and artificial flavors. They may also be carbonated or nonalcoholic cocktail mixers. Hawaiian Punch, Hi-C and Minute Maid are three of the better-known brands in the US. Other related drinks include Kool-Aid powdered drink mix, fassionola, and Tiki Punch (a carbonated soft drink from Shasta).

=== Alcoholic ===
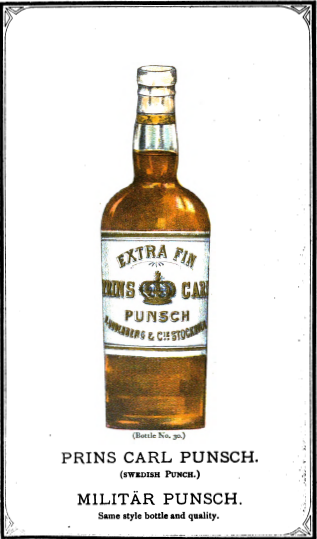
1891 liquor catalog entry for Punsch

Historically, most spirit based early alcoholic punches were made using either arrack or rum. Bajan (Barbadian) rum punch is one of the oldest rum punches and has a simple recipe enshrined in a national rhyme: "One of Sour, Two of Sweet, Three of Strong, Four of Weak." That is: one part lime juice, two parts sweetener, three parts rum (preferably Barbados), and four parts water. It is served with a dash or two of Angostura bitters and nutmeg.

There are many rum-based punches, including Planter's Punch, Fish House Punch, Caribbean Rum Punch, and others. Arrack based punches were included in Jacob Grohusko's 1910 and Charles Mahoney's 1912 bartenders guides, and an early recipe for arrack punch was written by Pehr Osbeck, Olof Torén, and Carl Gustaf Ekeberg in their 1771 book, A Voyage to China and the East Indies:

It is known to almost every one how punch is made; but, that it may be observed for the future where it is made to its greatest perfection, I will mention the true proportion of its constituent parts. To a quart of boiling water, half a pint of arrack is taken, to which one pound of sugar, and five or six lemons, or instead of them as many tamarinds as are necessary to give it the true acidity, are added: a nutmeg is likewise grated into it. The punch, which is made for the men in our ship was heated with red hot iron balls which were thrown into it. Those who can afford it, make punch a usual drink after dinner. While we stayed in China, we drunk it at dinner instead of wine which the company allowed the first table.

Alcoholic punches are common among parties for college and university students. These punches tend to be highly alcoholic and made with cheap ingredients. They may be referred to by names such as "grain punch" (made with high-proof grain alcohol and sundry mixers) or "jungle juice" (liquor of various sorts brought to a BYOB party, often mixed in an improvised large container such as a trash can with various carbonated beverages, kool-aid, or whatever is on hand). Some exclude additional water altogether and have 30% alcohol by volume (ABV) or more.

== Punches around the world ==
=== Australia ===
Blow My Skull is a famous alcoholic punch drink that originated in mid-19th-century Australia that contains rum, porter, lime, sugar, and other ingredients.

=== Barbados ===
Bajan Punch is made with rum, lime juice, cane sugar, nutmeg, and bitters. Falernum liqueur is also frequently added, which was itself an early form of punch made by steeping cloves with rum, lime, and other ingredients.

=== Caribbean ===
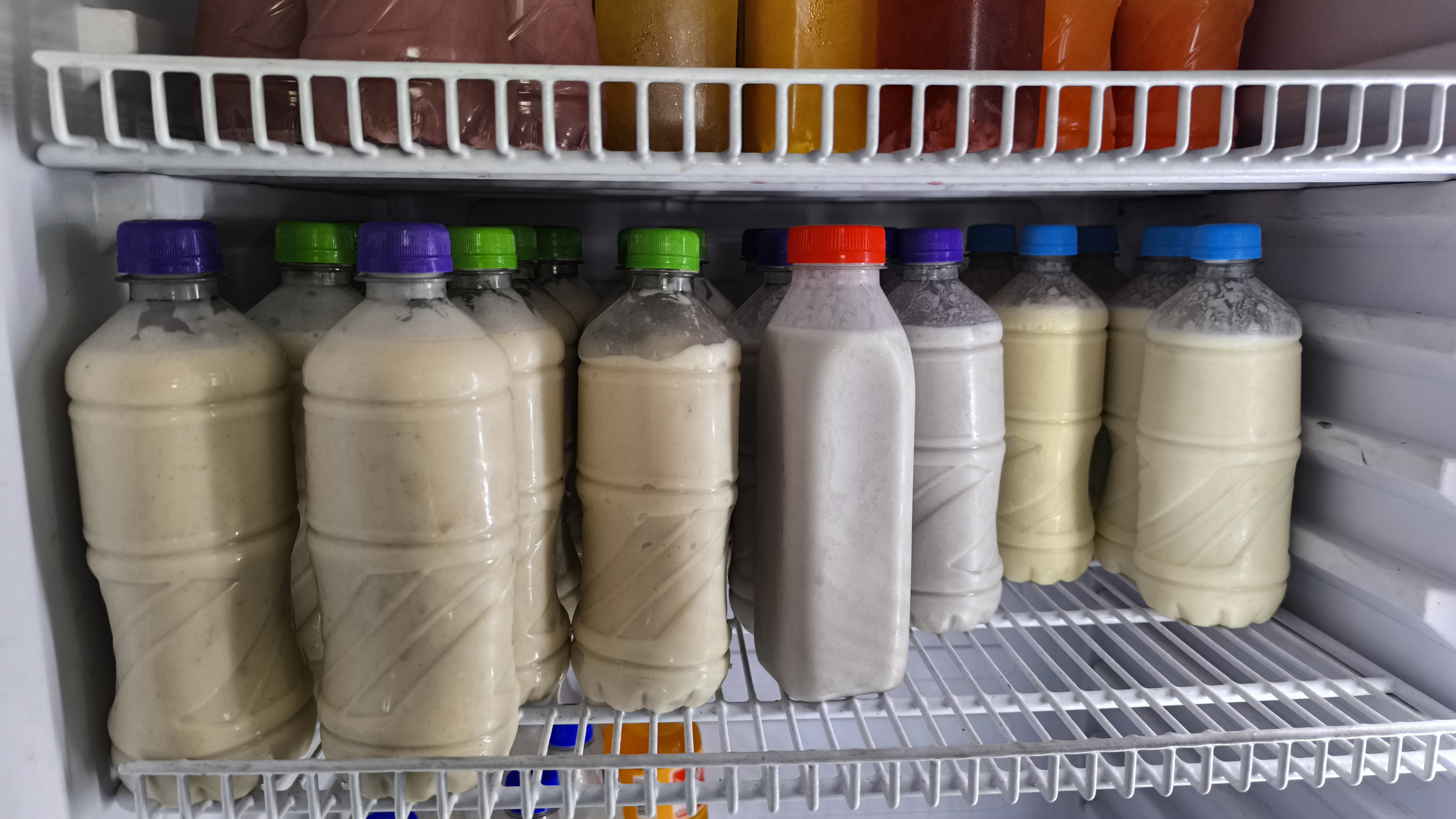
Sea moss, dasheen and cassava punches, Trinidad and Tobago

Ti' Punch, literally meaning "small punch", is a rum-based punch that is especially popular in Martinique and other French-speaking islands of Caribbean. The drink is traditionally made with white rhum agricole, lime, and cane syrup. Caribbean Fruit Punch is a more fruity non-alcoholic version typically found in Jamaica and Trinidad and Tobago. In Trinidad and Tobago, punches are non-alcoholic, milk-based drinks with an eponymous ingredient (e.g. strawberry for a strawberry punch), nutmeg and other spices. Alcoholic versions ("rum punch") exist as milk-based or fruit juice-based versions.

=== England ===
A cup is a style of punch, traditionally served before the departure of a hunting party in England. It is served at a variety of social events such as garden parties, cricket and tennis matches, and picnics. Cups are generally lower in alcohol content than other punches and usually use wine, cider, sloe gin, or liqueurs as the base. They often include quantities of fruit juices or soft drinks.

A well-known cup is the Pimm's Cup, using Pimm's No.1 (which contains gin) and British-style lemonade at a ratio of 1:2; a squeeze of lemon; then add orange, lemon and apple slices; a couple of cucumber wedges; and decorate with borage flowers.

=== Germany ===
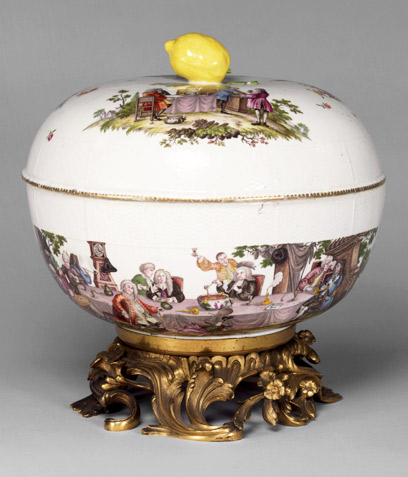
Punch bowl and stand, made at the Meissen factory, Germany, 1770, Victoria and Albert Museum

Punch (Punsch in German) refers to a mixture of several fruit juices and spices, often with wine or liquor added and mostly topped with champagne or sparkling wine. Punch is popular in Germany and with many Germans who emigrated to America. Parties on New Year's Eve ("Silvester") often include a Feuerzangenbowle ("burnt punch" or, literally, "fire tongs punch"). This is a punch made of red wine and flaming overproof rum (such as Stroh), poured over a Zuckerhut (sugarloaf), a large conical sugar cube placed in the "Feuerzange". It is similar to mulled wine ("Glühwein"). Another warm punch, popular with hunters or others spending time in the cold, is jagertee punch.

=== Indian subcontinent ===
Arrack-based punches were historically popular in India and Sri Lanka, where it was distilled from toddy, the wine made from sap of various palm trees.

=== Korea ===
Hwachae is a term for traditional Korean punches. Sujeonggwa is a traditional punch made from dried persimmons, cinnamon, and ginger.

=== Mexico ===
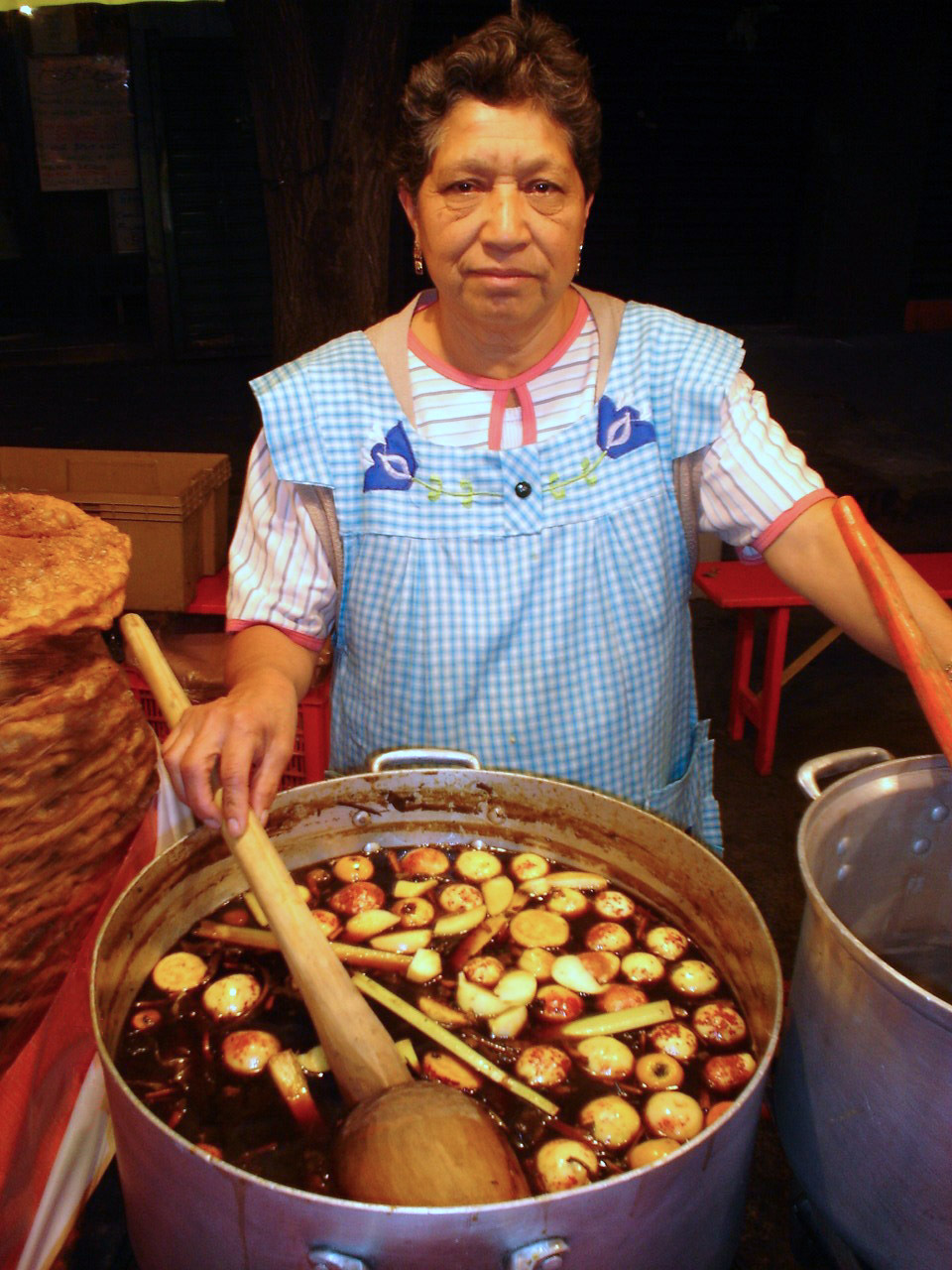
Ponche in Mexico

Ponche is traditionally prepared during the Christmas season in Mexico. It is served hot, typically accompanied by other Mexican holiday staples like tamales, champurrado and pan dulce. Some ingredients used to make ponche are more seasonal and are sometimes hard to get. Fresh tejocotes, the fruit of the hawthorn tree known to the Aztecs as Texocotli (stone fruit), and guavas are among the most usual. Other common ingredients in ponche include sugar cane pieces, piloncillo, apples, pears, dry hibiscus, raisins, prunes, clove and star anise.

=== Argentina ===
In Argentina and Uruguay, Claret Cup has been introduced by British immigrants and was widely adopted by the population. Known as Clericó, its Spanishized form, it is the traditional Christmas and New Year punch, which occur in the summer of the Southern Hemisphere. It is made with red wine and fruits such as oranges, apples, peaches, strawberries, etc. Other alcoholic beverages are commonly added in combination. In Argentina it is generally served from a punch bowl (ponchera).

Due to its proximity to Argentina, Paraguay has also adopted Clericó (and with the same Spanishized name) and it is also consumed during Christmas and New Year celebrations there. In Paraguay, it is typically served from a clay pot called kambuchi.

=== Sweden ===
"Punch" is typically called bål in Sweden, and is commonly served in a bowl at social functions (e.g. graduation or wedding receptions). Bål as thought of broadly should not be confused with punsch, which is a specific type of alcoholic punch using arrack that was very popular in Sweden in the decades around 1900. Due to its popularity the arrack punch saw commercial bottling in 1845, and became known more broadly outside Scandinavia as the liqueur Swedish punsch.

Dragoon punch was popular in Sweden and Norway in the early 1900s, and added both stout and beer to brandy, champagne, and sherry.

=== United States ===
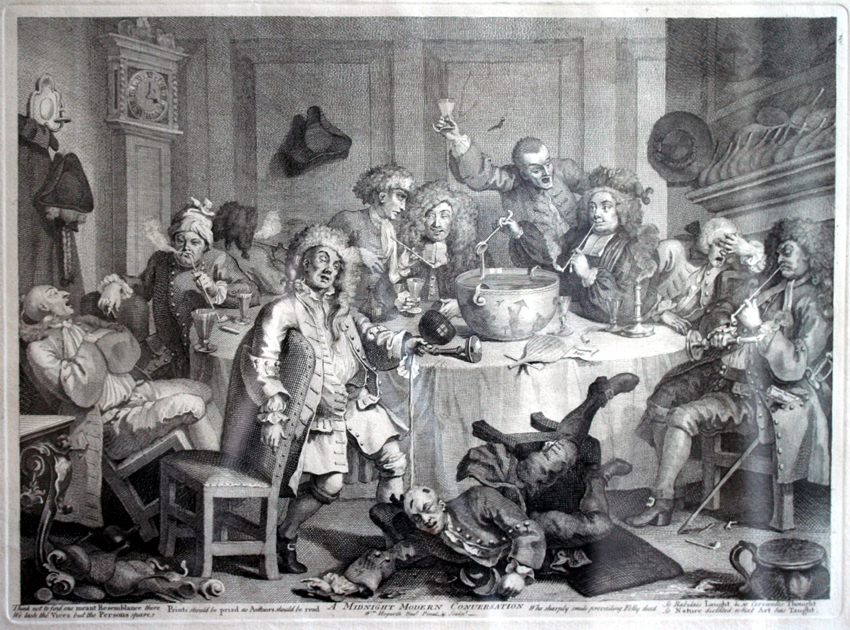
Gentlemen enjoying punch in about 1765, by William Hogarth

Some claim Planter's punch was invented by bartender Jerry Thomas at the Planter's House Hotel in St. Louis, Missouri. The recipe for Planter's Punch varies, containing some combination of rum, lemon juice, pineapple juice, lime juice, orange juice, grenadine, soda water, curaçao, Angostura bitters, and cayenne pepper. An early print reference to Planter's Punch appeared in the August 8, 1908 edition of The New York Times:

This recipe I give to thee,
dear brother in the heat.
Take two of sour (lime let it be)
To one and a half of sweet,
of Old Jamaica pour three strong,
and add four parts of weak.
Then mix and drink. I do no wrong —
I know whereof I speak.

Southern bourbon punch is a drink closely associated with Kentucky and other Southern states. Sweet bourbon punch is made with sweet tea (a signature drink of the South), citrus flavors and bourbon whiskey. Bourbon is named for Bourbon County, Kentucky, and each year during the Kentucky Derby, recipes for bourbon punch abound.

Fish House Punch is a classic 18th-century punch containing rum, cognac, and peach brandy first created at the State in Schuylkill club in Philadelphia. Guests of the club who partook of the punch include George Washington, the Marquis de Lafayette, and Chester A. Arthur. Though the exact formula for the punch has been officially kept secret by the club's members, published recipes for the punch date back to at least 1862. The punch has regained popularity in the 21st century, partially due to the renewed availability of real peach brandy from modern craft distillers.

Much like Swedish punsch, a number of punches bottled as liqueurs became regional specialties starting in the late-19th century. Hub Punch was created at the Hub House hotel in Thousand Islands, New York, and was bottled from 1879 until Prohibition by C.H. Graves & Sons of Boston. Hub Punch was briefly revived by Boston's Bully Boy Distillers in 2014. Cohasset Punch was bottled in Chicago for nearly a century from 1899 until the late-1980s, and was later referred to as "the definitive Chicago cocktail." Cohasset Punch was relaunched under new ownership in 2024.

== See also ==
- List of cocktails
- Fruit cocktail
- Fruit cup (cocktail)
- Jungle juice
- Kompot
- Mojito, a rum punch with added mint
- Non-alcoholic mixed drink
- Poncha, a traditional alcoholic drink from the island of Madeira
- Sangria
- Shrub (drink)

== Sources ==
- Cross, Robert (1996). The Classic 1000 Cocktails. ISBN 0-572-02161-5.
