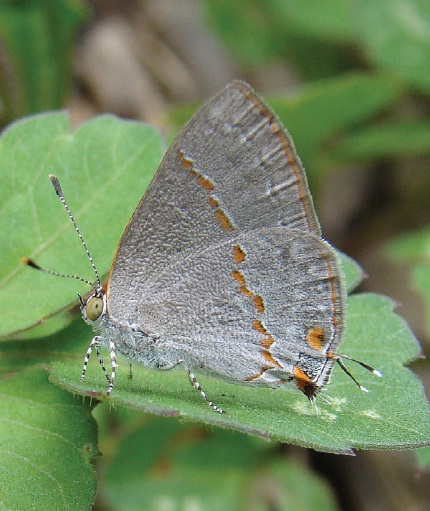

Scientific classification
- Domain: Eukaryota
- Kingdom: Animalia
- Phylum: Arthropoda
- Class: Insecta
- Order: Lepidoptera
- Family: Lycaenidae
- Genus: Ministrymon
- Species: M. janevicroy

Binomial name
- Ministrymon janevicroy Glassberg, 2013

= Ministrymon janevicroy =

Species of butterfly

Ministrymon janevicroy, the Vicroy's ministreak, is a butterfly in the family Lycaenidae. It is found from the southern United States (Texas) to Costa Rica (Guanacaste). There are disjunct populations on the Venezuelan islands of Curaçao and Isla Margarita. The habitat consists of dry deciduous forests and scrubs.

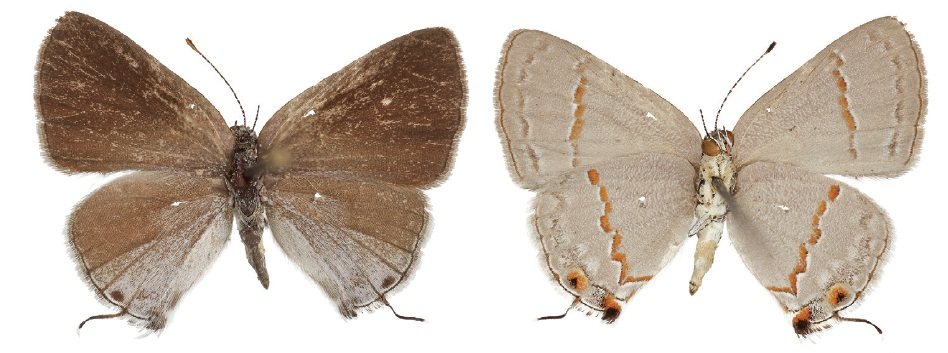

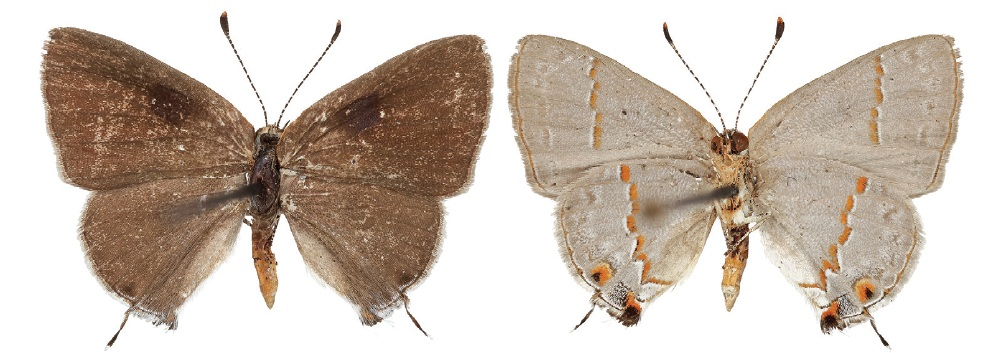

The length of the forewings is 9.1 mm for both males and females. Adults resemble Ministrymon azia, but have olive green eyes instead of the dark brown/black eyes. In Texas, adults have been recorded on wing from January to August.

The larvae possibly feed on Mimosa and Leucaena species.

== Etymology ==
The species is named for the wife of the author, Jane Vicroy Scott.
