= Pimm's =

English brand of gin-based fruit cup

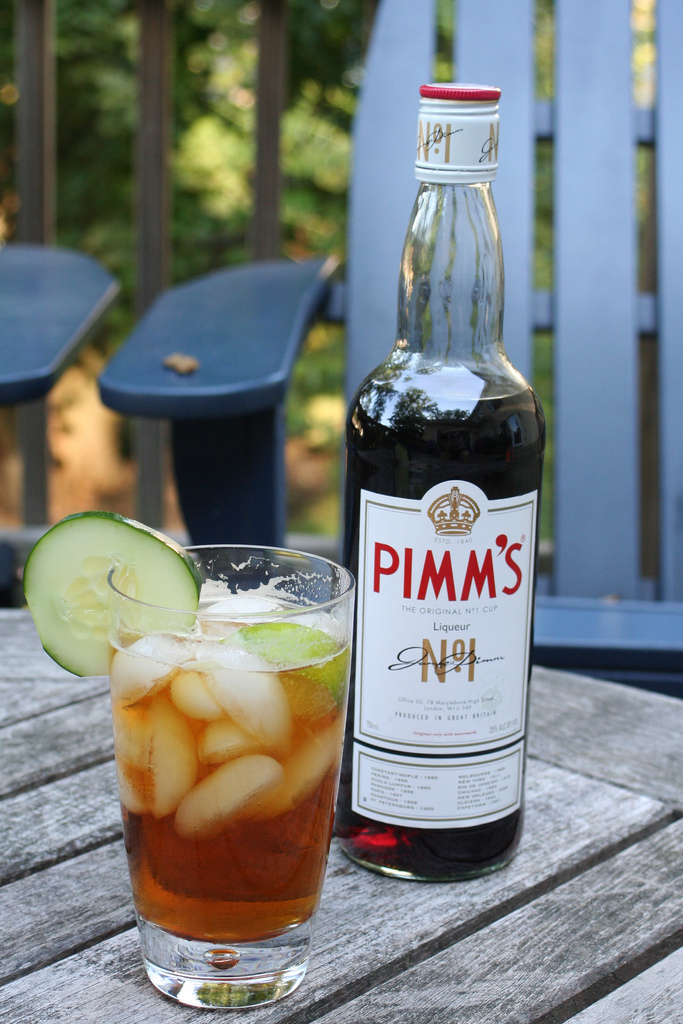
- A modern bottle of Pimm's No. 1 Cup alongside a Pimm's cup
- Product type: Liqueur
- Current owner: Diageo (since 1997)
- Country: England
- Introduced: 1823
- Previous owners: James Pimm, et al.

Pimm's is an English brand of gin-based fruit cup but may also be considered a liqueur or the basis of a sling or punch. It was first produced in 1823 by James Pimm and has been owned by Diageo since 1997. Its most popular product is Pimm's No. 1 Cup, commonly used for the Pimm's cup cocktail.

== Serving ==
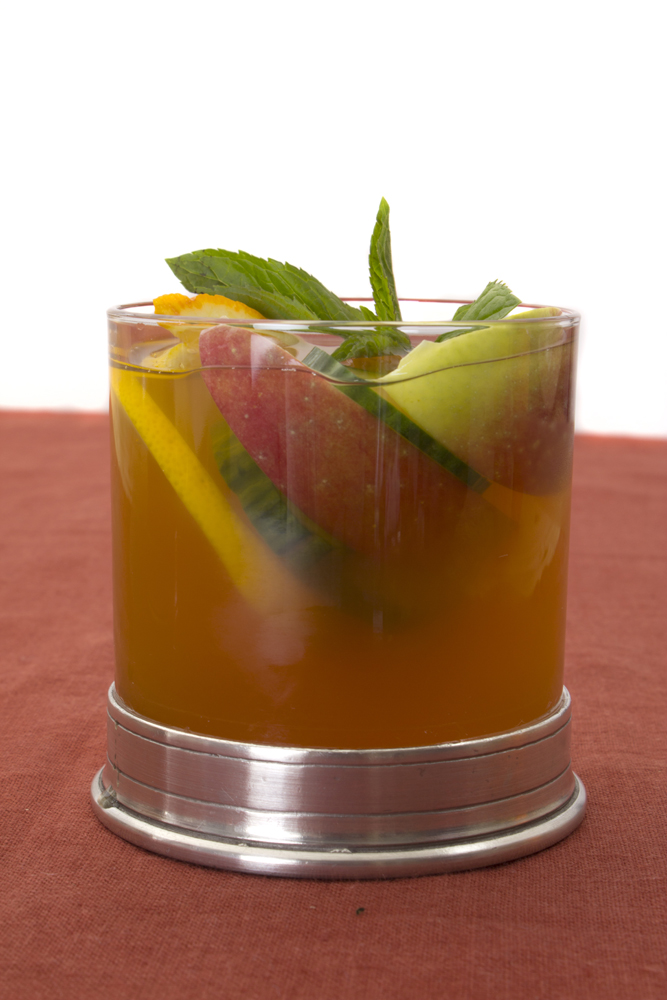
Pimm's and lemonade with mint sprigs and fruit

Pimm's is dark brown with a reddish tint, and a subtle taste of spice and citrus fruit. As a summer long drink, it is normally served as a Pimm's cup cocktail, a drink with "English-style" (clear and carbonated) lemonade, as well as various chopped garnishes, particularly apple, cucumber, orange, lemon, strawberry and mint or borage, though mint is more common. Ginger ale is used as a common substitute for lemonade.

Pimm's can also be mixed with champagne (or other sparkling white wines), resulting in a drink known as a "Pimm's Royal Cup". Pimm's Winter Cup is generally mixed with warm apple juice. A "Glasgow Garden Party" is a drink made with Pimm's, substituting lemonade with Irn-Bru and excluding any fruit garnish. A "Pimmlet" is a gimlet with Pimm's No.1 substituted for gin. A Pimm's mojito substitutes lemon and lime soda with muddled limes and soda water.

== History ==
Pimm, a farmer's son from Kent, became the owner of an oyster bar in the City of London, near the Bank of England. He offered the tonic (a gin-based drink containing a secret mixture of herbs and liqueurs) as an aid to digestion, serving it in a small tankard known as a "No. 1 Cup", hence its subsequent name. Some historians credit Pimm's successor, Samuel Morley, for serving the drink in what Morley called "cups." At the time of the drink's introduction, Angostura bitters were just arriving on the English market from Trinidad and Tobago, so Pimm may have capitalized on the fad. He originally thought it would be a digestif, but most people simply drank it as a cocktail.

In 1851, Pimm's No. 2 Cup and Pimm's No. 3 Cup were introduced. Pimm's began large-scale production in 1851 to keep up with sales to other bars. The distillery began selling it in 1859. In 1865, Pimm sold the business and the right to use his name to Frederick Sawyer. In 1880, the business was acquired by future Lord Mayor of London Horatio Davies, and a chain of Pimm's Oyster Houses was franchised in 1887.

Over the years, Pimm's extended their range, using other spirits as bases for new "cups". After the Second World War, Pimm's No. 4 Cup was invented, followed by Pimm's No. 5 Cup and Pimm's No. 6 Cup in the 1960s.

The brand fell on hard times in the 1970s and 1980s. The Oyster House chain was sold, and Pimm's Cup products Nos. 2 to 5 were phased out due to reduced demand in 1970, after new owners, The Distillers Company, took control of the brand. In 1986, The Distillers Company was purchased by Guinness PLC, and Pimm's became part of Diageo when Guinness and Grand Metropolitan merged in 1997. In 2004, Pimm's introduced Pimm's Winter Cup, which consists of Pimm's No. 3 Cup (the brandy-based variant) infused with spices and orange peel.

The discontinued No. 6 Vodka Cup variety was reinstated in 2015 following a successful campaign led by a group of enthusiastic Vodka Cup Pimm's drinkers. Despite a promise from the parent company and Pimm's owner Diageo to keep No. 6 in production, it is no longer possible to buy Vodka Cup Pimm's.

== Popularity and distribution ==
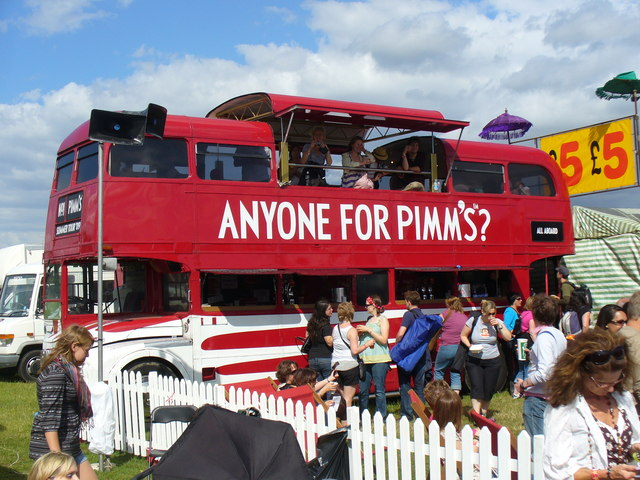
A Pimm's stand set up at a music festival using a converted bus as a bar

Pimm's is most popular in England, particularly southern England. It is one of the two staple drinks at the Wimbledon Championships, the Chelsea Flower Show, the Henley Royal Regatta and the Glyndebourne Festival Opera – the other being champagne. The first Pimm's Bar opened at the Wimbledon tournament in 1971; every year, over 80,000 pints of Pimm's cocktail are sold to spectators. Along with champagne, it has been declared one of two official drinks of Wimbledon, and it has also gained popularity among British universities. A Pimm's is also a standard cocktail at British and American polo matches.

The brand experienced a revival in the early 2000s following a 2003 advertising campaign, which featured a humorous classic upper-class "Hooray Henry" character called Harry Fitzgibbon-Sims (portrayed by Alexander Armstrong) with the catchphrase "It's Pimm's o'clock!", somewhat mocking their own traditional advertising and appeal. Diageo's 2010 campaign featured a more diverse range of characters representing different elements of the Pimm's cocktail (Pimm's No.1 being an Englishman in red and white blazer, lemonade being three young women in yellow, ice represented by a mature man), coming together to the theme tune of 1970s British secret agent action television series The New Avengers.

Although the recipe is famously a secret, Jane MacQuitty of The Times stated, "The fact that orange curaçao is the vital element in Pimm's No. 1 cup is common knowledge in the spirits world."

== Products ==
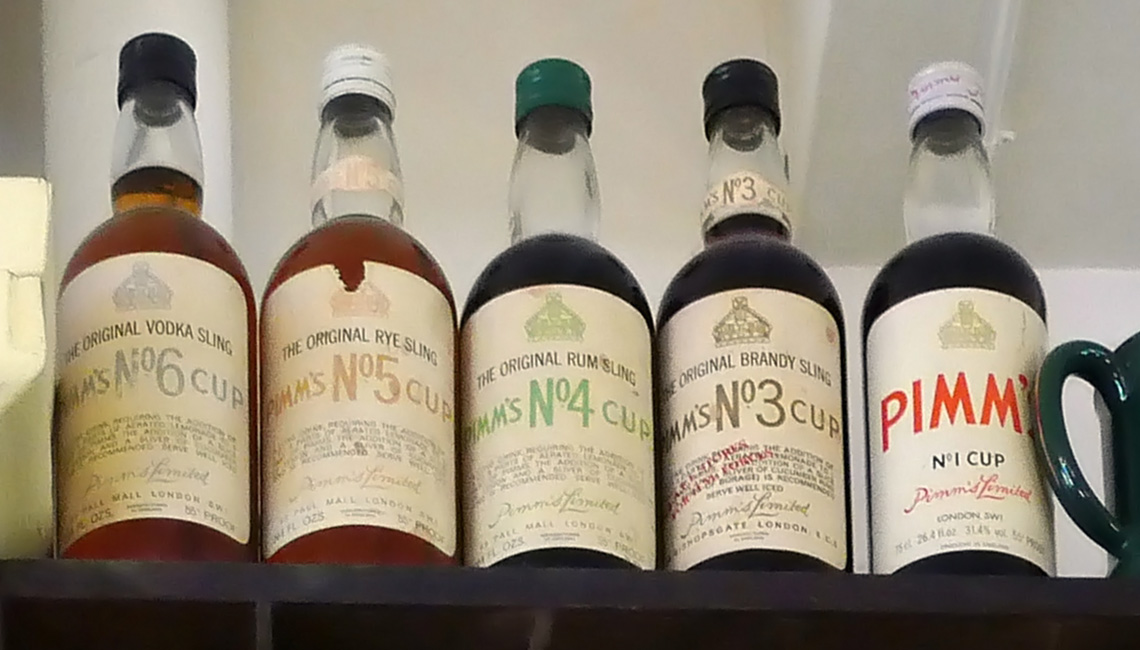
Vintage bottles of Pimm's products, 1930s or later

Seven Pimm's products have been produced throughout the brand's history, all fruit cups differing only in their alcoholic base. Only Nos. 1 and a 'Winter Cup' based on No. 3 remain in production. It was originally in 26 2/3 imperial oz. [757-ml] bottles, then made in standard metric 26.4 imperial oz. [750-ml] bottles when it started being sold overseas in Europe, and now is in 700 ml and 1 litre bottles. The beverages were originally a standard 31.53% ABV, then curbed to 28.90% ABV in the 1960s, and are now between 22% and 25% ABV.

- Pimm's No. 1 Cup [1840–present] is the most popular Pimm's cup. Based on gin, its base as bottled is 22% or 25% ABV, depending on the retailer.
- Pimm's No. 2 Cup [1930s–1970] was based on Scotch whisky, and was phased out by new brand owners The Distillers Company in 1970.
- Pimm's No. 3 Cup [1930s–1970; 2004–present] is based on brandy; it was phased out in 1970, and relaunched in 2004, now infused with spices and orange peel and called Pimm's Winter Cup.
- Pimm's No. 4 Cup [1935–1970] was based on dark rum.
- Pimm's No. 5 Cup [1930s?–1970] was based on rye whisky. It was originally designed as an alternative to Pimm's No. 2 for the Canadian market. Its popularity there during the postwar period encouraged Pimm's to sell it in the British market and overseas to Europe and America as well.
- Pimm's No. 6 Cup [1964–1970; 2004–2021] was based on vodka. It was reintroduced in 2004 as Pimm's Vodka Cup, temporarily discontinued in 2014, but brought back in 2015 after an outcry from Pimm's customers, only to be discontinued again in 2021.
- Pimm's No. 7 Cup [late 1960s? – 1970], based on tequila. It was designed for the American market, as tequila was not very popular in Britain and Europe at the time. It was made in such small numbers before it was discontinued that it is one of the rarest variants. Websites including Difford's Guide say the liqueur was introduced sometime after the Second World War, while other sources claim No. 7 was never a real commercial product.

The Pimm's No. 2 and No. 5 Cups were introduced as a mixer for whisky cocktails. The Pimm's No. 3 and No. 4 Cups were introduced as heated cold-weather or winter versions of the summertime Pimm's No. 1.

The Pimm's Winter Cup and Pimm's Vodka Cup were reintroduced in 2004. Pimm's Winter Cup is a seasonally available version of Pimm's No.3 infused with spices and orange peel. Pimm's Vodka Cup is a reintroduction of Pimm's No.6, but is made in limited quantities.

Pimm's Original No.1 Cup (frequently mixed with lemonade) (or "Pimm's & Lemonade") is a pre-mixed fortified lemonade with a Pimm's No. 1 base with a strength of 5.4% ABV. It is available in 12-packs of 250 ml cans or 1 litre bottles. Pimm's Lemonade & Ginger Ale is a pre-mixed fortified lemonade with a Pimm's No. 1 base and flavoured with ginger ale that has a strength of 4% ABV. It is available in 4-packs (or cases of six 4-packs) of 330 ml bottles.

There are also special edition versions that are 20% ABV and come in standard European 700 ml bottles. Pimm's Blackberry and Elderflower [made from 2013] is based on Pimms No. 6 with blackberry and elderflower flavouring. Pimm's Strawberry (with a hint of mint) [made from 2015] is based on Pimm's No. 1 with additional strawberry and mint flavouring.

== Imitators ==
Some retailers have marketed "Pimm's style" drinks under other names. In the UK, these have included Aldi's "Austin's", Lidl's "Jeeves", and Sainsbury's "Pitchers".

== See also ==
- List of cocktails
- List of liqueur brands
