= Honey deuce =

Signature cocktail of the US Open

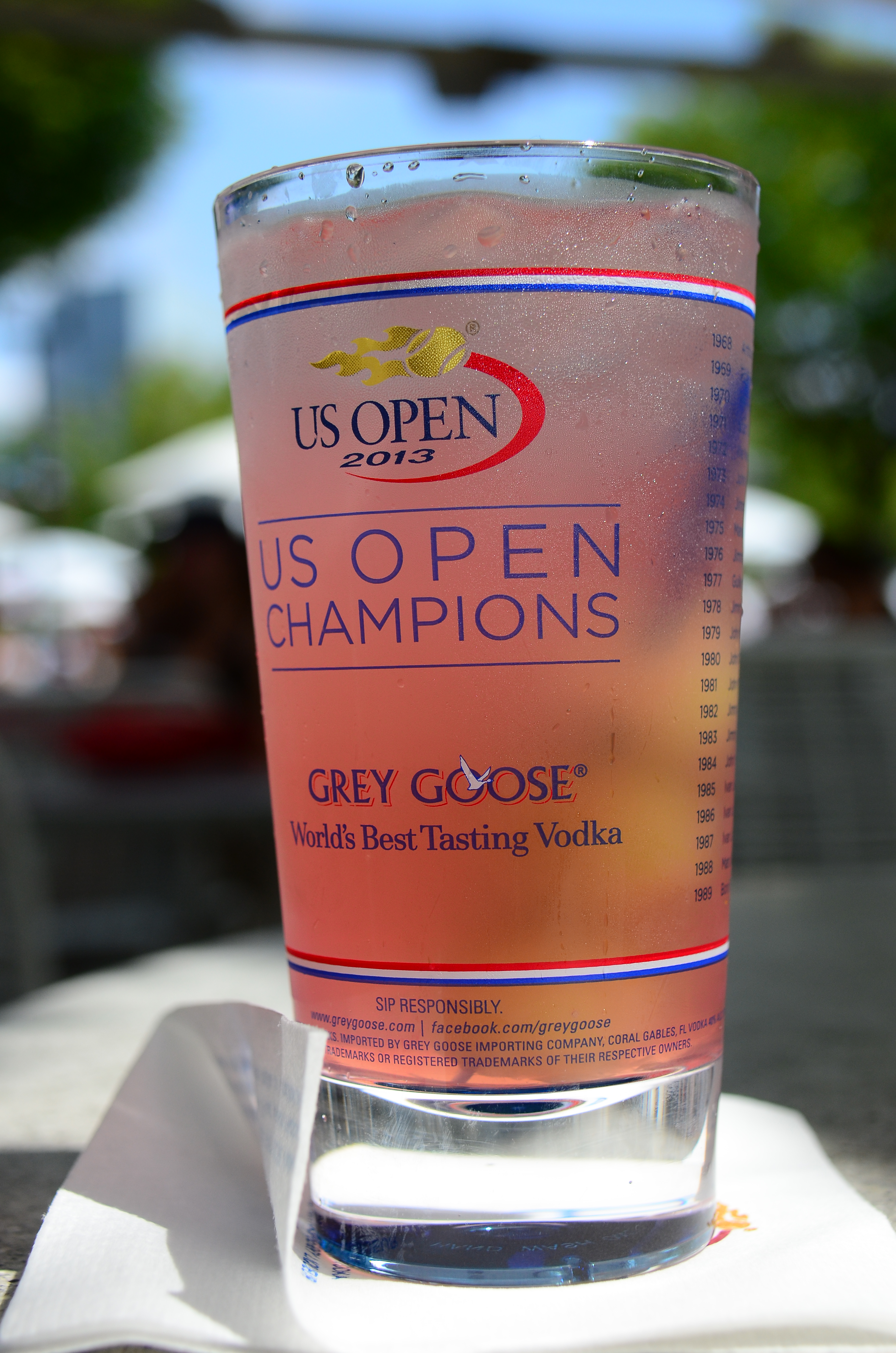
- Type: Mixed drink
- Ingredients: 1 ¼ oz vodka; 3 oz lemonade; ½ oz raspberry liqueur
- Base spirit: Vodka
- Website: www.greygoose.com/cocktails/grey-goose-vodka/honey-deuce.html
- Standard drinkware: Highball (collectible acrylic cup at the US Open)
- Standard garnish: Skewered balls of honeydew melon
- Served: Cubed ice
- Preparation: Fill a chilled highball glass with cubed ice and add vodka. Top with fresh lemonade and raspberry liqueur. Garnish with a skewer of one or multiple frozen honeydew melon balls.

Honey deuce is an alcoholic cocktail, consisting primarily of vodka, lemonade, raspberry liqueur, and skewered balls of honeydew melon. Vaughn Vreeland of The New York Times categorizes it as a spiked lemonade or a punch.

The honey deuce was created by restaurateur Nick Mautone as the signature cocktail of the US Open tennis tournament, with the melon balls cut to resemble green tennis balls. It celebrated its 20th anniversary in 2026. As of September 2024 the Grey Goose vodka company estimated sales of over 2.2 million drinks to tennis fans in a collectible acrylic cup. In 2024, it was priced at $23 per drink.

Two counterparts in tennis worldwide are the Pimm's cup for Wimbledon, and champagne for the French Open.

== See also ==
- Pimm's cup
