= Beeplant =

Beeplant is a common name for several plants and may refer to:

- Cleome, a genus of flowering plants, also known as spiderplants or spiderflowers
- Borago officinalis, a species of flowering plant, also known as borage or starflower

== See also ==
- List of crop plants pollinated by bees
