= Pimm's cup =

English cocktail

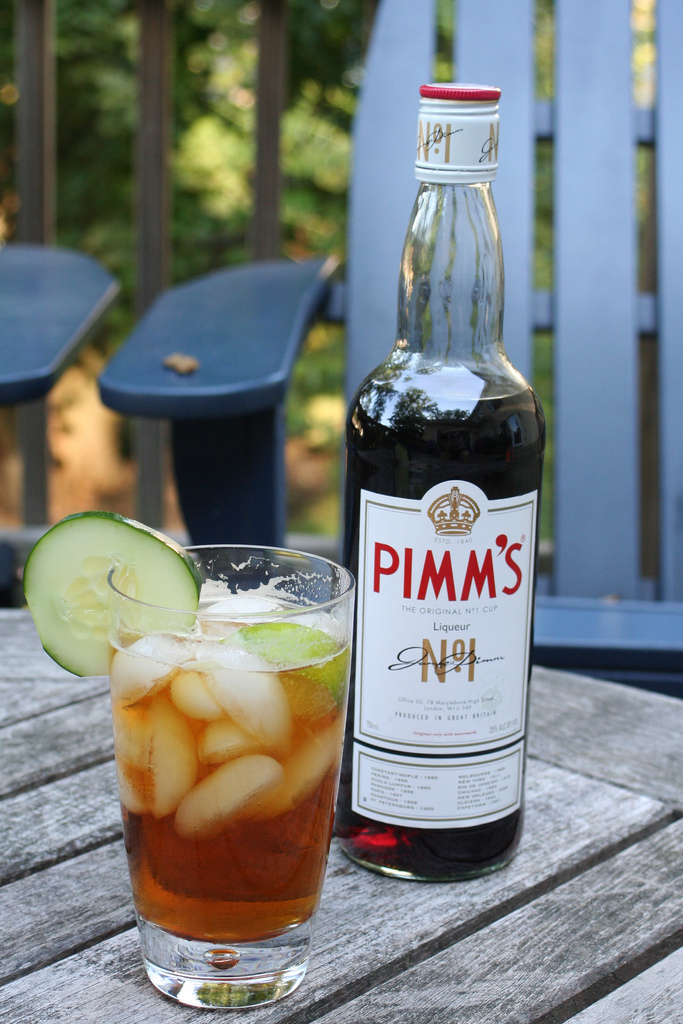
- Type: Highball
- Ingredients: 44 ml (1.5 US fl oz) Pimm's No. 1 Cup; 130 ml (4.5 US fl oz) English-style lemonade
- Standard drinkware: Highball glass
- Standard garnish: Cucumber slice or peel, mint sprig, orange slices, strawberries

The Pimm's cup is a cocktail that is popular in England, in the United Kingdom (where it is referred to as just "Pimm's"). It is one of numerous fruit cups, a type of cocktail with gin, a soft drink, and fruit. Its primary spirit is Pimm's No. 1 Cup, a gin-based beverage flavoured with fruits and spices invented around 1823 as a health drink.

The Pimm's cup is the official cocktail of many summer events in England, including the Chelsea Flower Show, the Henley Royal Regatta and the Royal Ascot. For the last 50 years the drink has been associated with Wimbledon.

== Preparation ==
A summer long drink, the Pimm's cup is made with Pimm's No. 1 Cup, an English-style (clear and carbonated) lemonade, lemon or lime juice and various chopped garnishes, particularly apple, cucumber, orange, lemon, strawberry and mint or borage, though mint is more common. Ginger ale or ginger beer is used as a common substitute for lemonade. All liquid ingredients are added to a highball glass with ice, followed by garnishes.

=== Variations ===
Pimm's can also be mixed with champagne (or other sparkling white wines), resulting in a drink known as a "Pimm's royal cup". Pimm's winter cup is generally mixed with warm apple juice. A "Glasgow Garden Party" is a drink made with Pimm's substituting lemonade with Irn Bru excluding any fruit garnish. A "Pimmlet" is a gimlet with Pimm's No.1 substituted for gin. A Pimm's mojito substitutes lemon and lime soda with muddled limes and soda water.

== History ==
The base liqueur of a Pimm's cup, Pimm's, was created sometime after 1823, when James Pimm opened an oyster bar and began serving spirit-based punches and cups. Pimm received his first liquor licence in 1851, and leased or sold the bar to S. D. Morey in 1856; it changed hands several times afterwards. At one point, Pimm, one of his employees or one of his successors, created the first Pimm's liqueur, designed to be mixed with lemonade. This was trademarked and commercially released in 1912.

The cocktail was introduced to the United States in the late 1940s, where it became popular in New England and New Orleans.

== See also ==
- Honey deuce
- List of cocktails
