= Amabiline =

Names
- Preferred IUPAC name [(7aS)-5,6,7,7a-Tetrahydro-3H-pyrrolizin-1-yl]methyl (2S)-2-hydroxy-2-[(1S)-1-hydroxyethyl]-3-methylbutanoate

Identifiers
CAS Number	17958-43-9
3D model (JSmol)	Interactive image
ChEBI	CHEBI:2617
ChemSpider	391061
KEGG	C10263
PubChem CID	442706
UNII	HG6G8EU69E
CompTox Dashboard (EPA)	DTXSID60939241
- InChI: InChI=1S/C15H25NO4/c1-10(2)15(19,11(3)17)14(18)20-9-12-6-8-16-7-4-5-13(12)16/h6,10-11,13,17,19H,4-5,7-9H2,1-3H3/t11-,13-,15-/m0/s1 Key: DRVWTOSBCBKXOR-WHOFXGATSA-N
- SMILES: C[C@@H]([C@@](C(C)C)(C(=O)OCC1=CCN2[C@H]1CCC2)O)O

Properties
Chemical formula	C_{15}H_{25}NO_{4}
Molar mass	283.368 g·mol^{−1}
- Except where otherwise noted, data are given for materials in their standard state (at 25 °C [77 °F], 100 kPa). Infobox references

Amabiline is a pyrrolizidine alkaloid first isolated in 1967 from Cynoglossum amabile. It is also found in the seeds and flowers of borage (Borago officinalis) and in borage seed oil.

Chemically, it is the ester derived from viridifloric acid and supinidine.

Amabiline is hepatotoxic and may contribute to the potential liver damage caused by consumption of borage and its seed oil.
