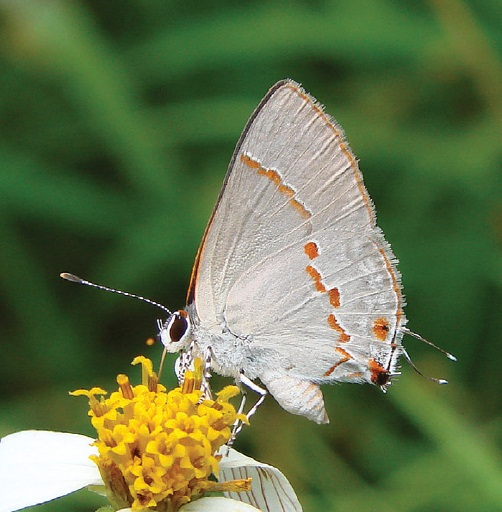

Scientific classification
- Domain: Eukaryota
- Kingdom: Animalia
- Phylum: Arthropoda
- Class: Insecta
- Order: Lepidoptera
- Family: Lycaenidae
- Genus: Ministrymon
- Species: M. azia

Binomial name
- Ministrymon azia (Hewitson, 1873)

Synonyms
- Thecla azia Hewitson, 1873; Tmolus azia; Calycopis azia; Strymon azia; Thecla guacanagari Wallengren, 1860; Thecla nipona Hewitson, 1877; Thecla brocela Dyar, 1913; Ministrymon quebradivaga Johnson & Miller, 1991; Ministrymon hernandezi Schwartz & Johnson, 1992

= Ministrymon azia =

Species of butterfly

Ministrymon azia, the gray ministreak, is a butterfly in the family Lycaenidae. It is found from the southern United States to southern Brazil, Paraguay and Argentina. It is found in virtually all lowland habitats, ranging from deserts in coastal Peru and Chile to rainforests in the Amazon basin.

The wingspan is 16–24 mm. Adults are on wing from March to September in Florida and Texas, but year-round in most of the tropics. Adults feed on the nectar of various flowers, including Leucaena leucocephala, Melilotus alba, Cynoglossum amabile, Bidens alba, Turnera ulmifolia, Mimosa pudica and Acacia species.

The larvae feed on the flowers of a wide variety of Fabaceae, including Acacia, Mimosa (including M. malacophylla) and Leucaena species (including L. leucocephala), as well as Lysiloma bahamensis.
