= Fruit cup (cocktail) =

Alcoholic drink

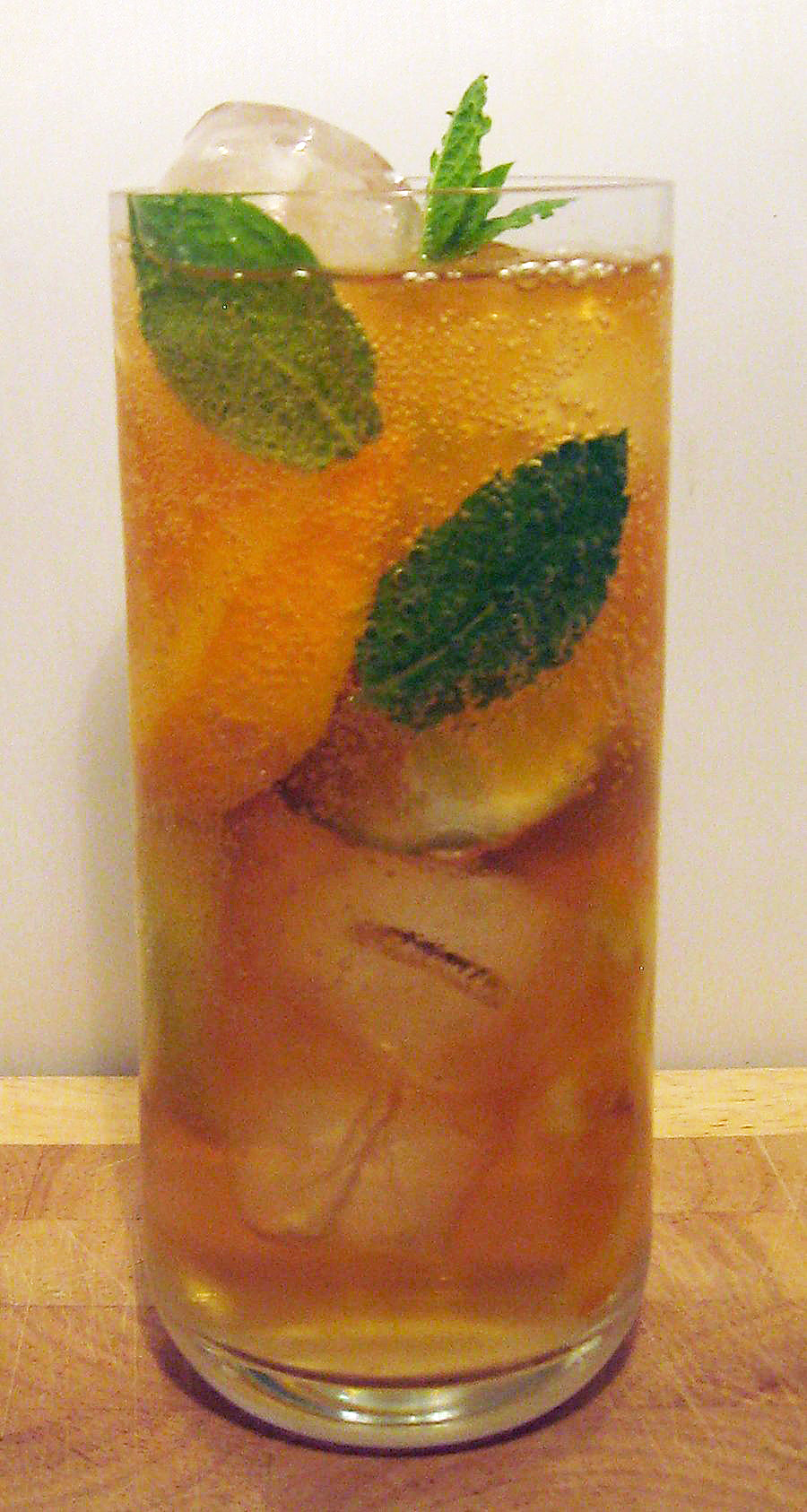
A glass of prepared Fruit Cup mixed with lemonade

A fruit cup, also known as a summer cup, is traditionally an English speciality drink designed to be made into a long drink with addition of a soft drink such as lemonade or ginger ale. Most commonly, these are gin-based, although there are some varieties based on other spirits such as vodka. The base gin is flavoured with various herbs, spices, fruits, and botanicals as well as its strength reduced. Fruit cups are typically marketed for the summer months, served with fruit as a cocktail garnish to the drink and to improve the flavour; recommendations include apple, orange, strawberry, lemon, lime, cucumber, mint, and borage leaves.

== Varieties ==
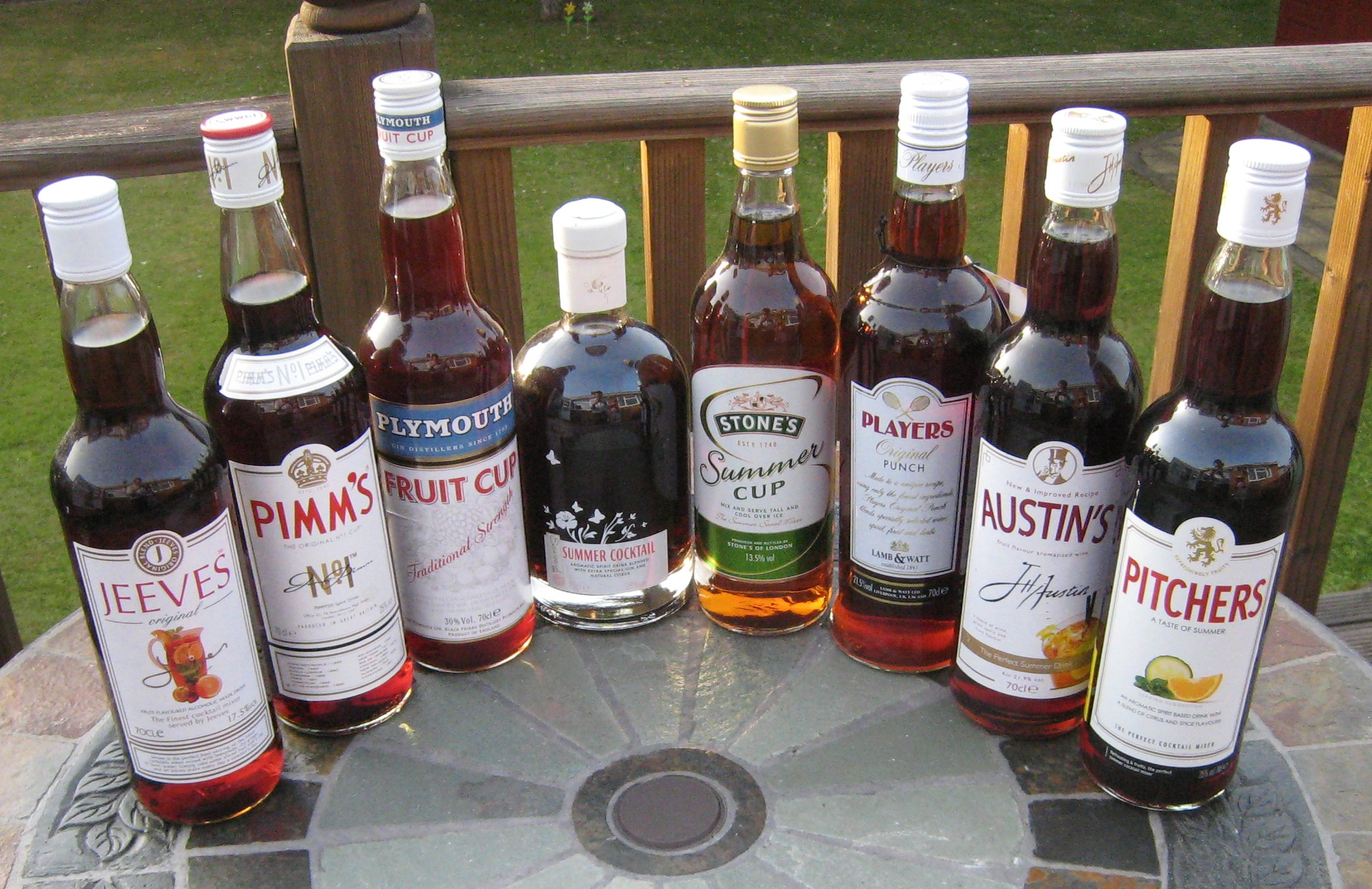
A selection of different bottled fruit cups

=== Pimm's fruit cup ===
Pimm's No. 1 is a gin-based drink invented by James Pimm, at 25% ABV. Pimm's numbers 2–6 were based on Scotch whisky, brandy, rum, rye whiskey, and vodka, respectively. As of 2012, only Pimm's No. 1, Pimm's Winter Cup (a variant of No. 3), and Pimm's No. 6 (renamed simply Pimm's 'Vodka Cup') still survive.

=== Plymouth fruit cup ===
Launched in 2003 and produced by the makers of Plymouth Gin, it is one of the strongest fruit cups at 30% ABV, which Plymouth says gives it a fuller flavour. It is the result of the base of Plymouth Gin being mixed with fruit liqueurs, vermouths, aromatic bitters and citrus extracts.

=== Stone's summer cup ===
Introduced in 2006, produced by the same makers of Stone's Ginger wine it is based on a traditional recipe and retains a traditional ginger note. It is available in 70cL bottles with a strength of 13.5% ABV.

=== Others ===
Other varieties of fruit cup include Ableforth's summer fruit cup, Players, Jeeves from Lidl, Austin's from Aldi, Pitchers, Chase, Heston from Waitrose, Fortnum & Mason's summer cup (made by The London Distillery Company), Sipsmith and Tappers' hydropathic pudding.
