= Thesinine =

Names
- Preferred IUPAC name [(1R,7aR)-Hexahydro-1H-pyrrolizin-1-yl]methyl (2E)-3-(4-hydroxyphenyl)prop-2-enoate

Identifiers
CAS Number	488-02-8
3D model (JSmol)	Interactive image
ChemSpider	4954561
PubChem CID	6452120
UNII	XQX78QNQ57
- InChI: InChI=1S/C17H21NO3/c19-15-6-3-13(4-7-15)5-8-17(20)21-12-14-9-11-18-10-1-2-16(14)18/h3-8,14,16,19H,1-2,9-12H2/b8-5+/t14-,16+/m0/s1 Key: FQVNMXZPGWLUFZ-BNVCYRGBSA-N; InChI=1/C17H21NO3/c19-15-6-3-13(4-7-15)5-8-17(20)21-12-14-9-11-18-10-1-2-16(14)18/h3-8,14,16,19H,1-2,9-12H2/b8-5+/t14-,16+/m0/s1 Key: FQVNMXZPGWLUFZ-BNVCYRGBBG
- SMILES: O=C(OC[C@H]2[C@@H]1N(CCC1)CC2)\C=C\c3ccc(O)cc3

Properties
Chemical formula	C_{17}H_{21}NO_{3}
Molar mass	287.359 g·mol^{−1}
- Except where otherwise noted, data are given for materials in their standard state (at 25 °C [77 °F], 100 kPa). Infobox references

Thesinine is a pyrrolizidine alkaloid first isolated from Thesium minkwitzianum from which it derives its name. It is also found in the flowers and seeds of borage.
