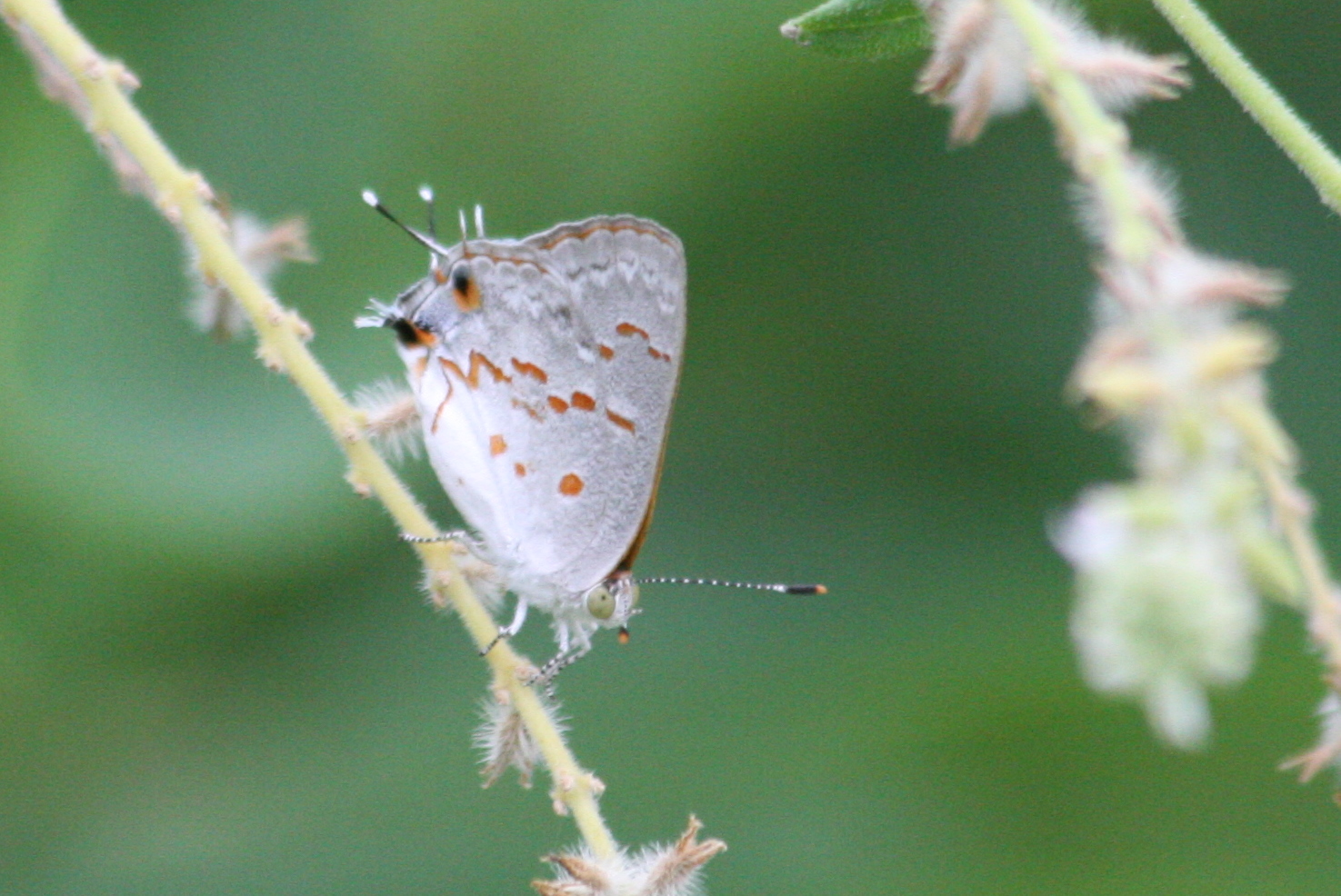

Scientific classification
- Domain: Eukaryota
- Kingdom: Animalia
- Phylum: Arthropoda
- Class: Insecta
- Order: Lepidoptera
- Family: Lycaenidae
- Genus: Ministrymon
- Species: M. clytie

Binomial name
- Ministrymon clytie (W.H. Edwards, 1877)

Synonyms
- Thecla clytie Edwards, 1877; Callicista clytie; Thecla maevia Godman & Salvin, [1887]; Strymon daplissus Johnson & Salazar, 1993; Ministrymon daplissus

= Ministrymon clytie =

Species of butterfly

Ministrymon clytie, the Clytie hairstreak, is a butterfly of the family Lycaenidae. It was described by William Henry Edwards in 1877. It is found from southern Arizona, New Mexico and Texas to Mexico, Guatemala and Costa Rica. The habitat consists of tropical forest openings and subtropical thorn forests.

The larvae feed on Pithecellobium species.
