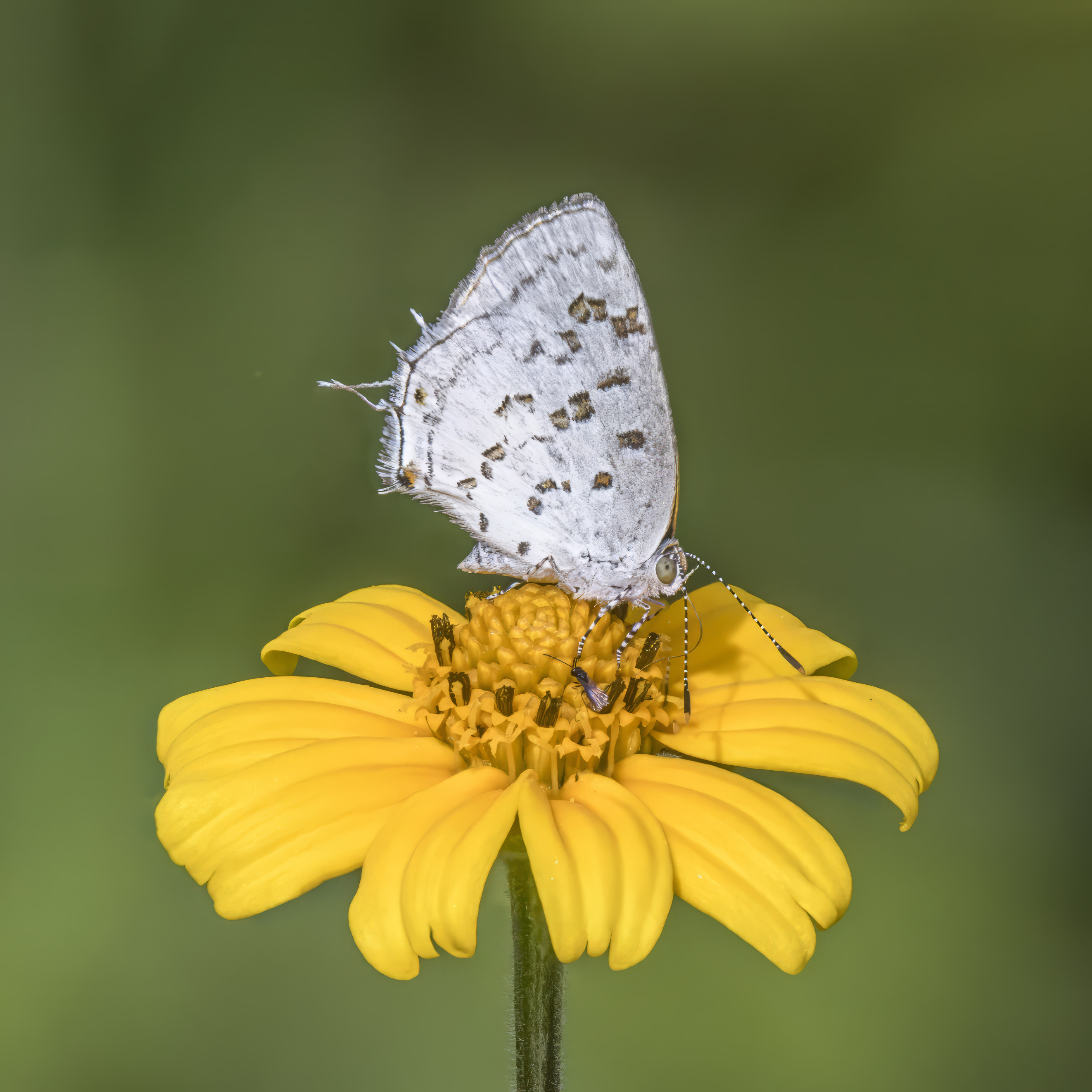
- Ministrymon una una, Colombia

Scientific classification
- Kingdom: Animalia
- Phylum: Arthropoda
- Class: Insecta
- Order: Lepidoptera
- Family: Lycaenidae
- Genus: Ministrymon
- Species: M. una

Binomial name
- Ministrymon una (Hewitson, 1873)

= Ministrymon una =

Species of butterfly

Ministrymon una, also known by its common name pale ministreak, is a species of butterfly from the genus Ministrymon.
