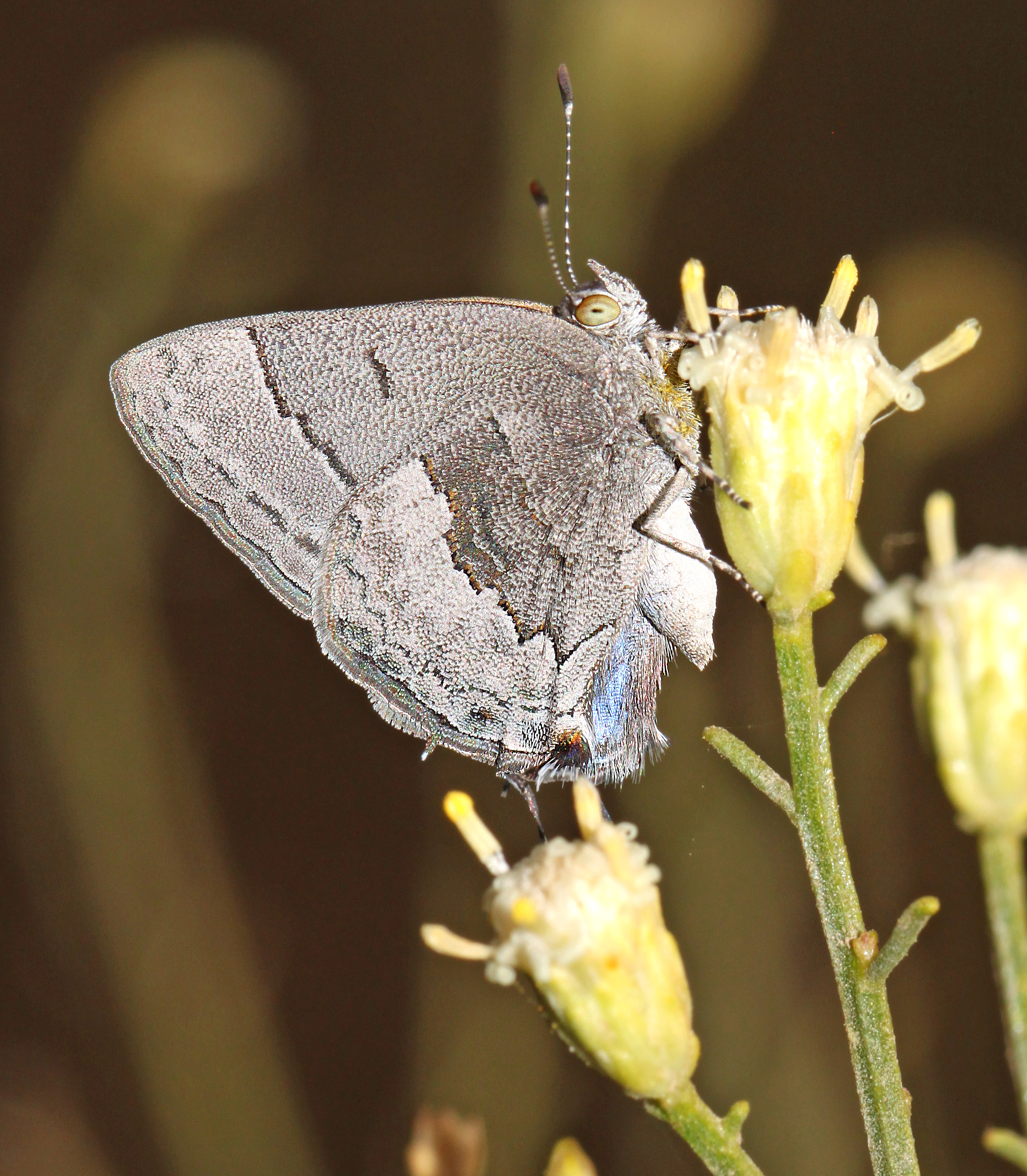

Scientific classification
- Domain: Eukaryota
- Kingdom: Animalia
- Phylum: Arthropoda
- Class: Insecta
- Order: Lepidoptera
- Family: Lycaenidae
- Tribe: Eumaeini
- Genus: Ministrymon
- Species: M. leda

Binomial name
- Ministrymon leda (W. H. Edwards, 1882)

= Ministrymon leda =

Species of butterfly

Ministrymon leda, the leda ministreak, is a species of hairstreak in the butterfly family Lycaenidae. It is found in North America.\

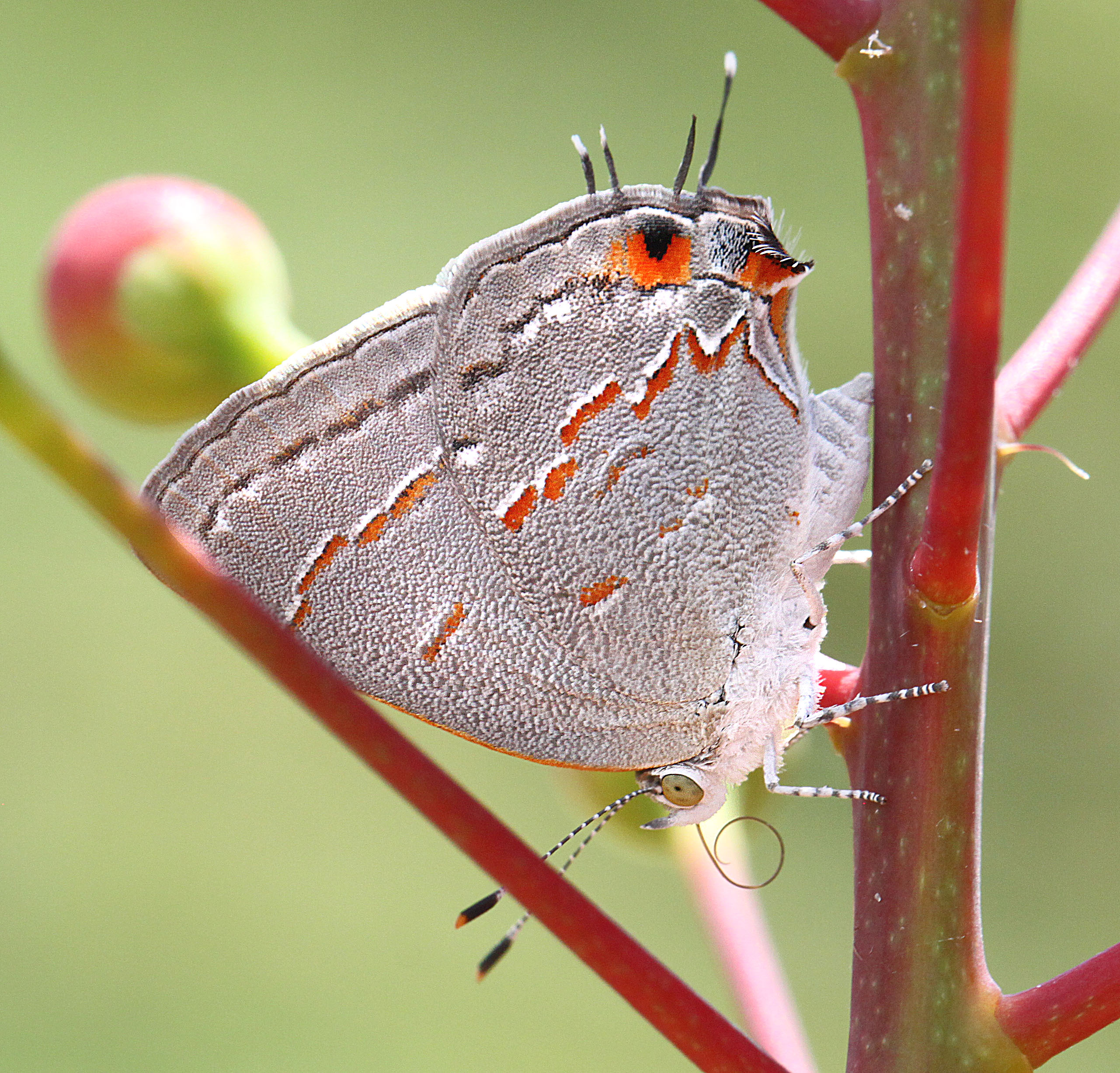
Leda ministreak, Ministrymon leda
