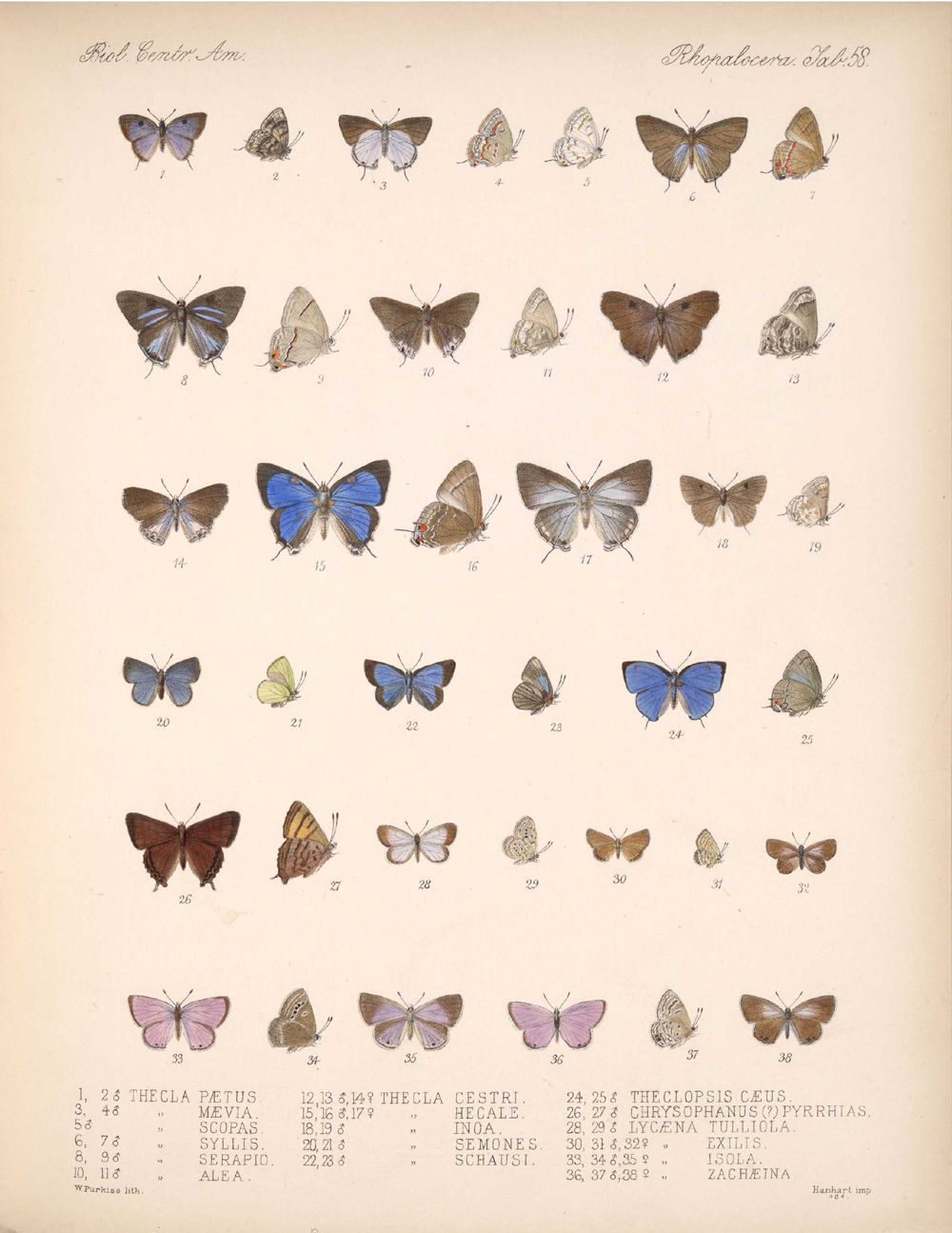
- Figures 3 and 4 Ministrymon clytie, figure 5 Ministrymon una

Scientific classification
- Kingdom: Animalia
- Phylum: Arthropoda
- Clade: Pancrustacea
- Class: Insecta
- Order: Lepidoptera
- Family: Lycaenidae
- Tribe: Eumaeini
- Genus: Ministrymon; Clench, 1961

= Ministrymon =

Butterfly genus in family Lycaenidae

Ministrymon is a genus of butterflies in the family Lycaenidae. The species of this genus are found in the Nearctic and Neotropical realms.

== Species ==
- Ministrymon albimimicus (Johnson, 1986)
- Ministrymon arola (Hewitson, 1868)
- Ministrymon arthuri Bálint, Johnson & Austin, [1999]
- Ministrymon azia (Hewitson, 1873)
- Ministrymon cleon (Fabricius, 1775)
- Ministrymon clytie (Edwards, 1877)
- Ministrymon coronta (Hewitson, 1874)
- Ministrymon cruenta (Gosse, 1880)
- Ministrymon fostera (Schaus, 1902)
- Ministrymon gamma (Druce, 1909)
- Ministrymon inoa (Godman & Salvin, [1887])
- Ministrymon janevicroy Glassberg, 2013
- Ministrymon leda (Edwards, 1882)
- Ministrymon ligia (Hewitson, 1877)
- Ministrymon megacles (Stoll, [1780])
- Ministrymon ollantaitamba (Johnson, Miller & Herrera, 1992)
- Ministrymon phrutus (Geyer, 1832)
- Ministrymon sanguinalis (Burmeister, 1878)
- Ministrymon una (Hewitson, 1873)
- Ministrymon zilda (Hewitson, 1873)
