= Borage seed oil =

Oil derived from the seeds of Borago officinalis

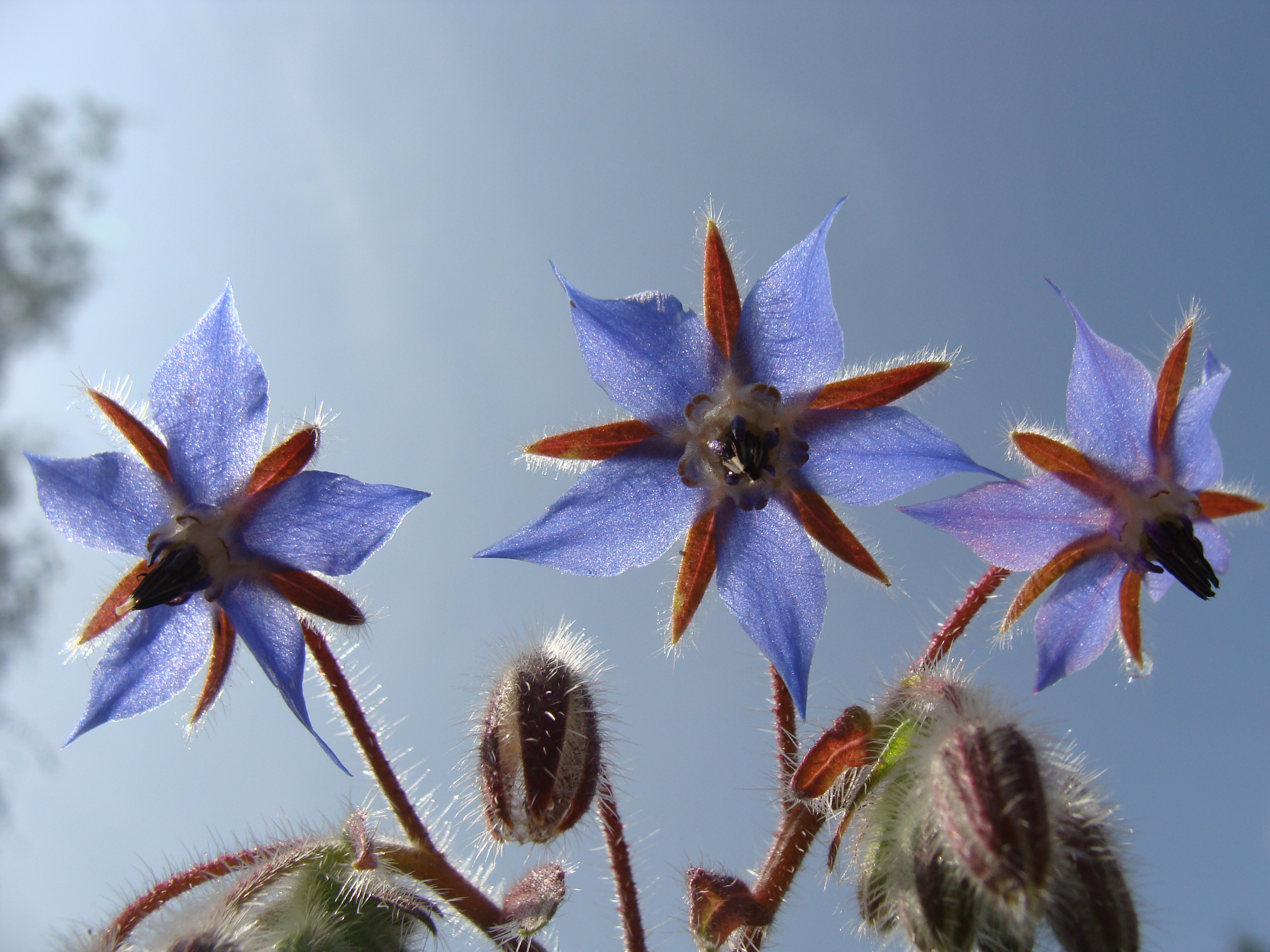
Borage plant flowers

Borage seed oil is derived from the seeds of the plant, Borago officinalis (borage).

Borage seed oil has one of the highest amounts of γ-linolenic acid (GLA) of seed oils — higher than blackcurrant seed oil or evening primrose oil, to which it is considered similar. GLA is typically composed of about 24% of the oil.

== Biology ==
=== Effects ===
GLA is converted to dihomo-γ-linolenic acid (DGLA), a precursor to a variety of the 1-series prostaglandins and the 3-series leukotrienes. It inhibits leukotriene synthesis to provide therapy in rheumatologic illness. Borage seed oil, therefore, may have anti-inflammatory and anti-thrombotic effects. It has been studied for its potential to treat inflammatory disorders, arthritis, atopic eczema, and respiratory inflammation.

=== Uses ===
In herbal medicine, borage seed oil has been used for skin disorders such as eczema, seborrheic dermatitis, and neurodermatitis; it has also been used for rheumatoid arthritis, stress, premenstrual syndrome, diabetes, attention deficit-hyperactivity disorder (ADHD), acute respiratory distress syndrome (ARDS), alcoholism, pain and swelling (inflammation), and for preventing heart disease and stroke. There is insufficient scientific evidence to determine the effectiveness of borage for a majority of these uses.

Several clinical studies have shown the oil to be ineffective at treating atopic eczema. Its efficacy to treat eczema was not better than placebo when taken orally.

== Safety ==
=== Adverse effects ===
Borage oil may contain the pyrrolizidine alkaloid amabiline, which is hepatotoxic leading to a risk of liver damage.

Patients should use borage oil that is certified free of toxic unsaturated pyrrolizidine alkaloids (UPAs). Consumption of 1-2 g of borage seed oil daily can result in an intake of toxic UPAs approaching 10 ug. The German Federal Health Agency specifies consumption to be limited to 1 ug of UPA daily.

Borage oil may be unsafe during pregnancy because preliminary studies suggest borage oil has a teratogenic effect and that its prostaglandin E agonist action may cause premature labor.

Seizures have been reported as a complication of ingestion of borage oil in doses of 1,500 to 3,000 mg daily, although a mixed review of borage oil's effect on seizure thresholds indicates that borage oil quality varies. A specific extraction process may offer purified products with 50%+ GLA content.

Borage seed oil might prolong bleeding time, increase the risk of bruising and bleeding, and increase the risk of bleeding during and after surgery.

=== Interactions ===
Because borage oil can theoretically lower the seizure threshold due to its GLA content, it could therefore trigger a seizure in users of phenothiazines or tricyclic antidepressants.

Use of NSAIDs with borage oil may theoretically decrease the effects of borage oil, as NSAIDs interfere with the synthesis of prostaglandin E.
