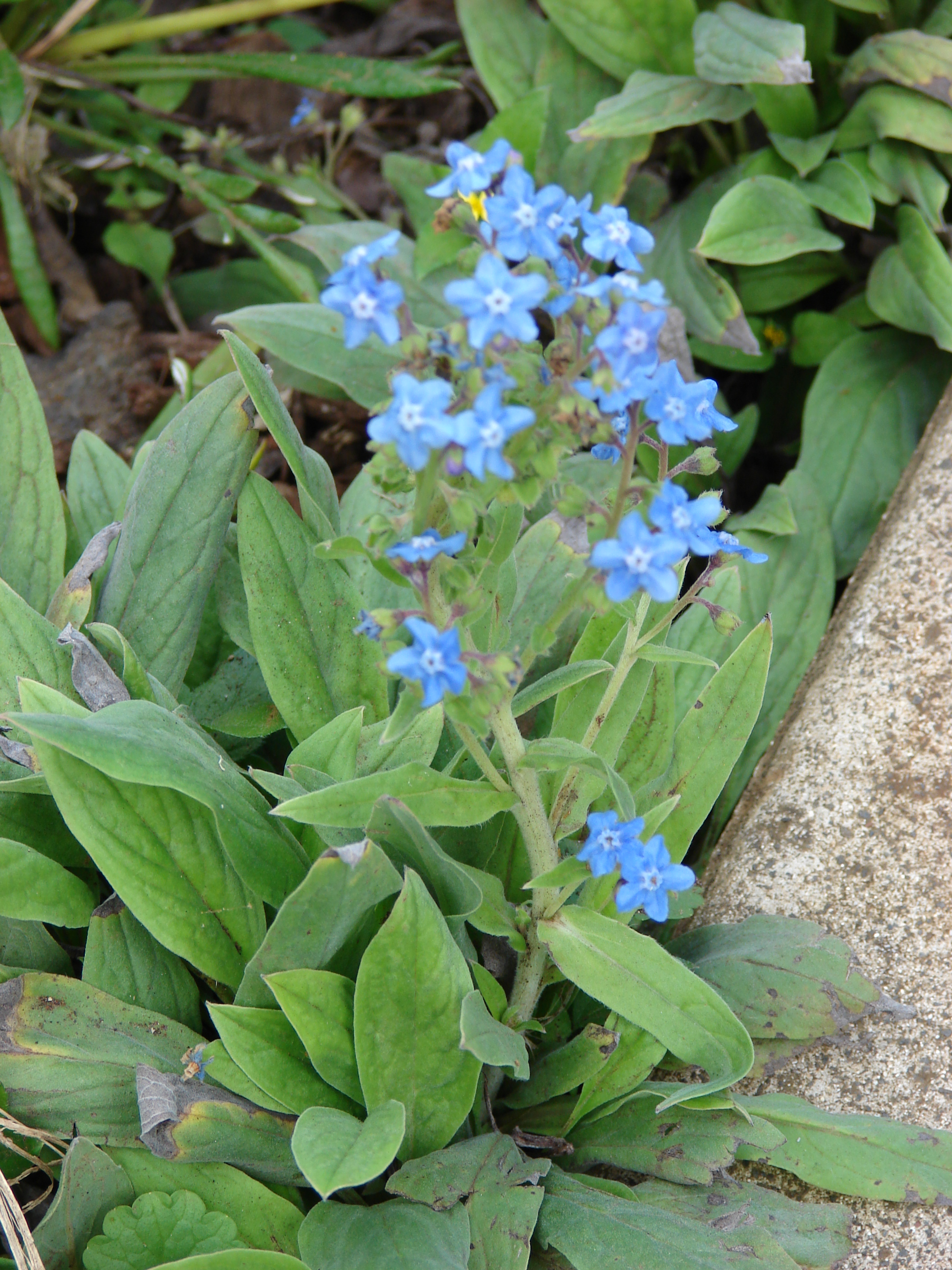

Scientific classification
- Kingdom: Plantae
- Clade: Tracheophytes
- Clade: Angiosperms
- Clade: Eudicots
- Clade: Asterids
- Order: Boraginales
- Family: Boraginaceae
- Genus: Cynoglossum
- Species: C. amabile

Binomial name
- Cynoglossum amabile Stapf & J.R.Drumm.

= Cynoglossum amabile =

Species of flowering plant

Cynoglossum amabile, the Chinese hound's tongue or Chinese forget-me-not, is a species of flowering plant in the family Boraginaceae, native to Asia. A hardy annual growing to 50 cm (20 in), it has hairy leaves and cymes of sky-blue flowers in late summer. This plant, closely related to the common forget-me-not of temperate gardens (Myosotis sylvatica), is also grown as an ornamental. In cultivation in the UK it has gained the Royal Horticultural Society's Award of Garden Merit. (confirmed 2017).

The Latin specific epithet amabile means "lovely".

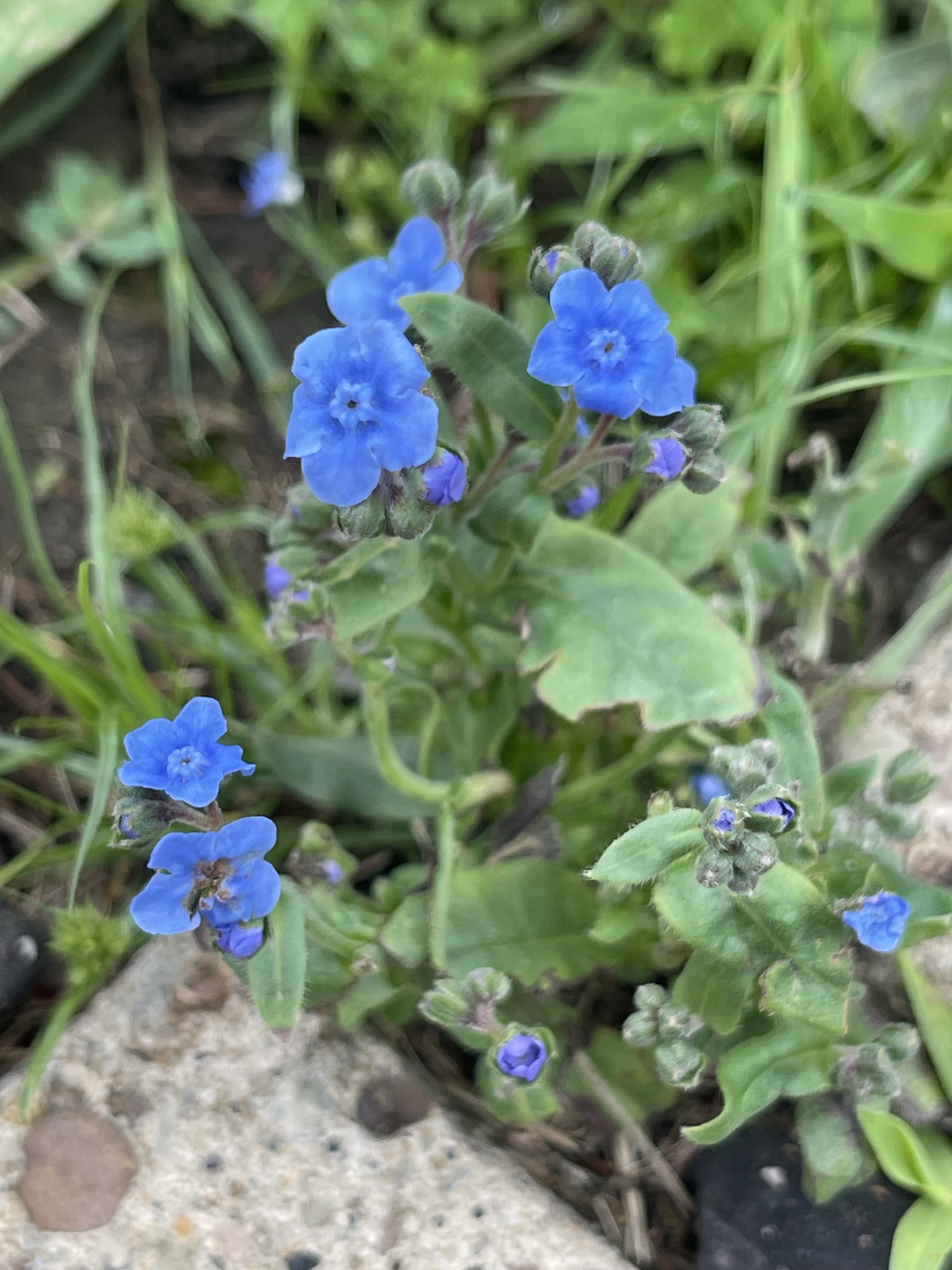
A close up of the blossoms and buds of Cynoglossum amabile

== Toxicity ==
Cynoglossum amabile contains tumorigenic pyrrolizidine alkaloids such as amabiline.
