= Planter's punch =

Cocktail

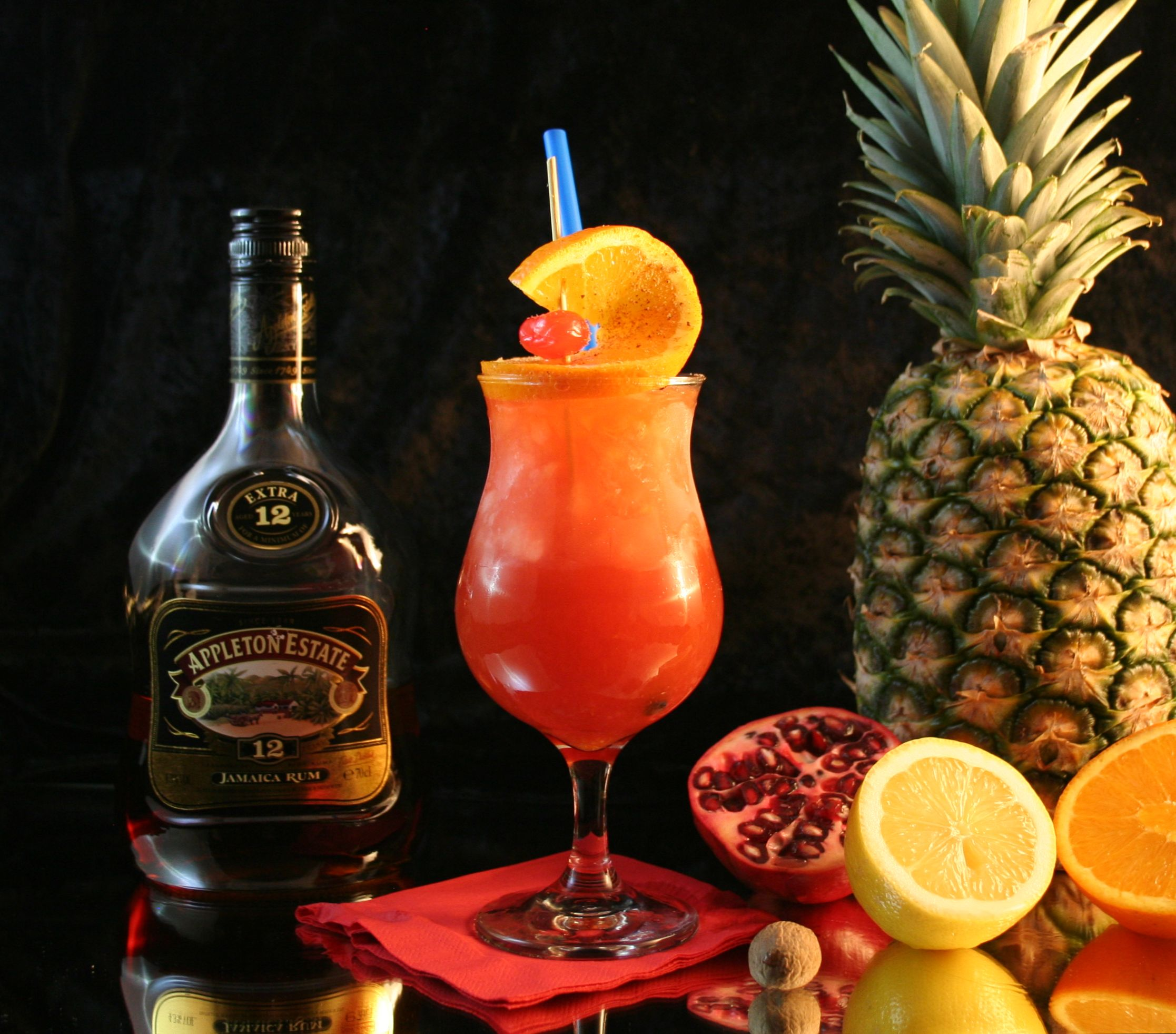
- Planter's punch
- Type: Mixed drink
- Ingredients: 45 ml Jamaican rum; 15 ml lime juice; 30 ml sugar cane juice
- Base spirit: Rum
- Website: iba-world.com/iba-cocktail/planters-punch/
- Standard drinkware: Beverage glass
- Standard garnish: orange zest
- Preparation: Pour all ingredients directly in a small tumbler or a typical terracotta glass.

Planter's punch is an IBA Official Cocktail made of Jamaican rum, fresh lime juice, and sugar cane juice. The cocktail originated in Jamaica.

The September 1878 issue of the London magazine Fun listed the recipe as follows:

A wine-glass with lemon juice fill,
Of sugar the same glass fill twice
Then rub them together until
The mixture looks smooth, soft, and nice.

Of rum then three wine glasses add,
And four of cold water please take. A
Drink then you'll have that's not bad—
At least, so they say in Jamaica.
