= James Pimm =

English caterer, inventor of Pimm's liqueur (1798–1866)

James Pimm (9 November, 1798 – 16 August, 1866) was an English caterer who created the gin-based liqueur known as Pimm's.

Pimm was born and raised in Newnham, Kent the son of James Norris Pimm, a tenant farmer, and his wife Susannah. He was classically educated in Edinburgh, Scotland, where he focused his studies on theology. In his early 20s, he moved to London where he established himself as a shellfish monger, opening Pimm's Oyster Bar. He married Mary Southernden Mallery (1797–1864) on 2 June 1822. Her family worked in the fishing industry. In 1850 he was also listed as both a confectioner and fishmonger at No. 77 Cheapside. There was a controversy in 1851 when he applied for a liquor license which opened public debate in the town, with many weighing in for and against; he prevailed, and details appear below, under the sources. Within ten years, he was running a chain of five restaurants patronised by members of the British gentry and hoi polloi alike, including members of the royal family. Pimm and his wife Mary had at least 11 children, though only 7 reached adulthood.

Pimms, Pimms, wonderful Pimms —
Drink up, and always be merry
Just add what I say,
Ever keep it that way,
But please never put in a cherry!

— Attributed to James Pimm, Pimms Oyster Bar, London

Pimm died at the family home in East Peckham, Kent, although he was still known to be residing in addresses in The City of London around the time of his death. He is buried at Holy Trinity Church, East Peckham, Kent, England.

== Sources ==
- How a Farmer's Son Invented the Taste of the Social Summer, by Mark Gardner, Faversham Times, 25 June 2005.
