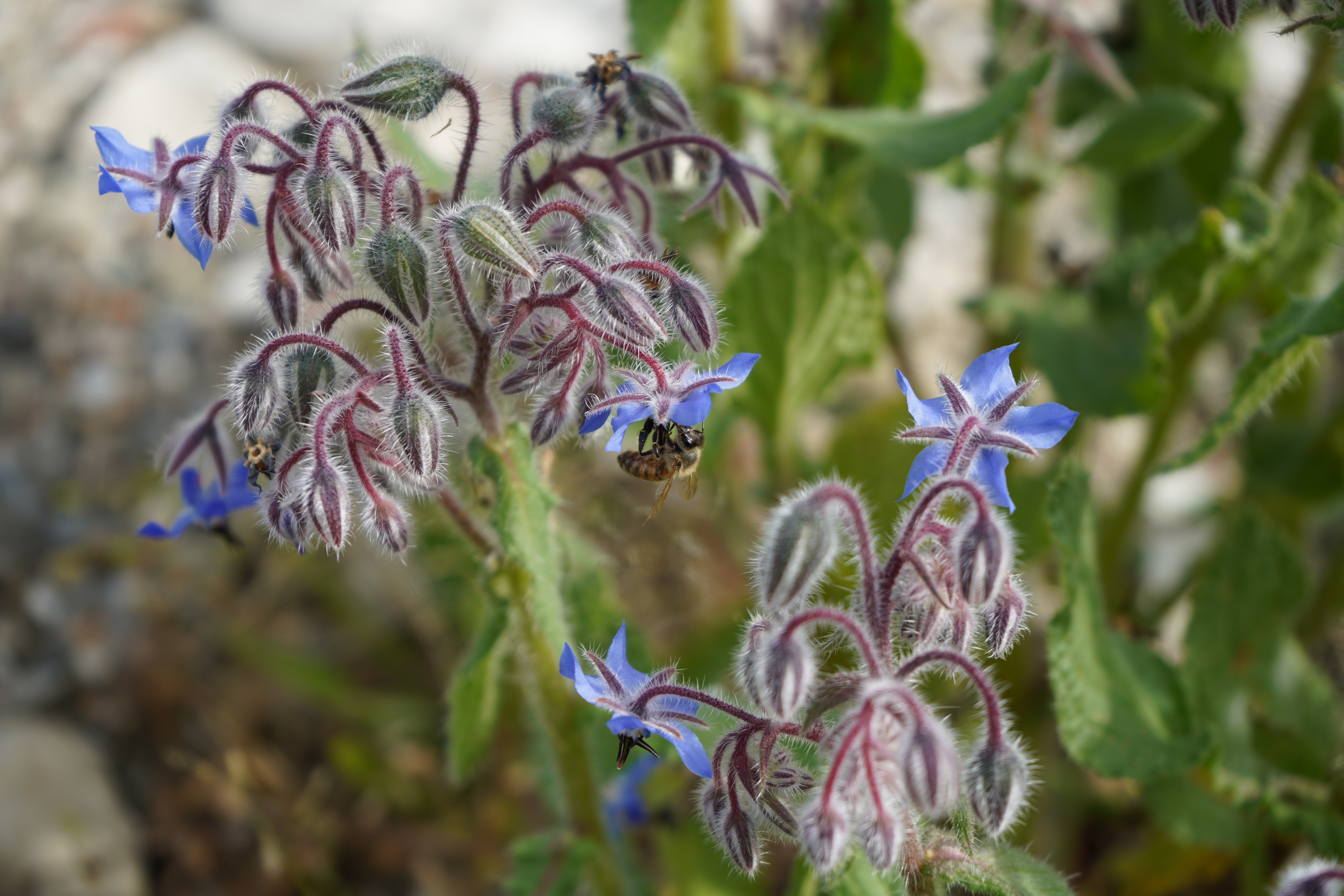
- Borage

Scientific classification
- Kingdom: Plantae
- Clade: Tracheophytes
- Clade: Angiosperms
- Clade: Eudicots
- Clade: Asterids
- Order: Boraginales
- Family: Boraginaceae
- Genus: Borago
- Species: B. officinalis

Binomial name
- Borago officinalis L.

Synonyms
- Synonyms: Borago advena Gilib.; Borago aspera Gilib.; Borago hortensis L.

= Borage =

Species of flowering plant

Borage (/ˈbʌrɪdʒ/ or /ˈbɒrɪdʒ/; Borago officinalis), also known as starflower, is an annual herb in the flowering plant family Boraginaceae native to the Mediterranean region. Although the plant contains small amounts of pyrrolizidine alkaloids, some parts are edible and its seeds provide oil.

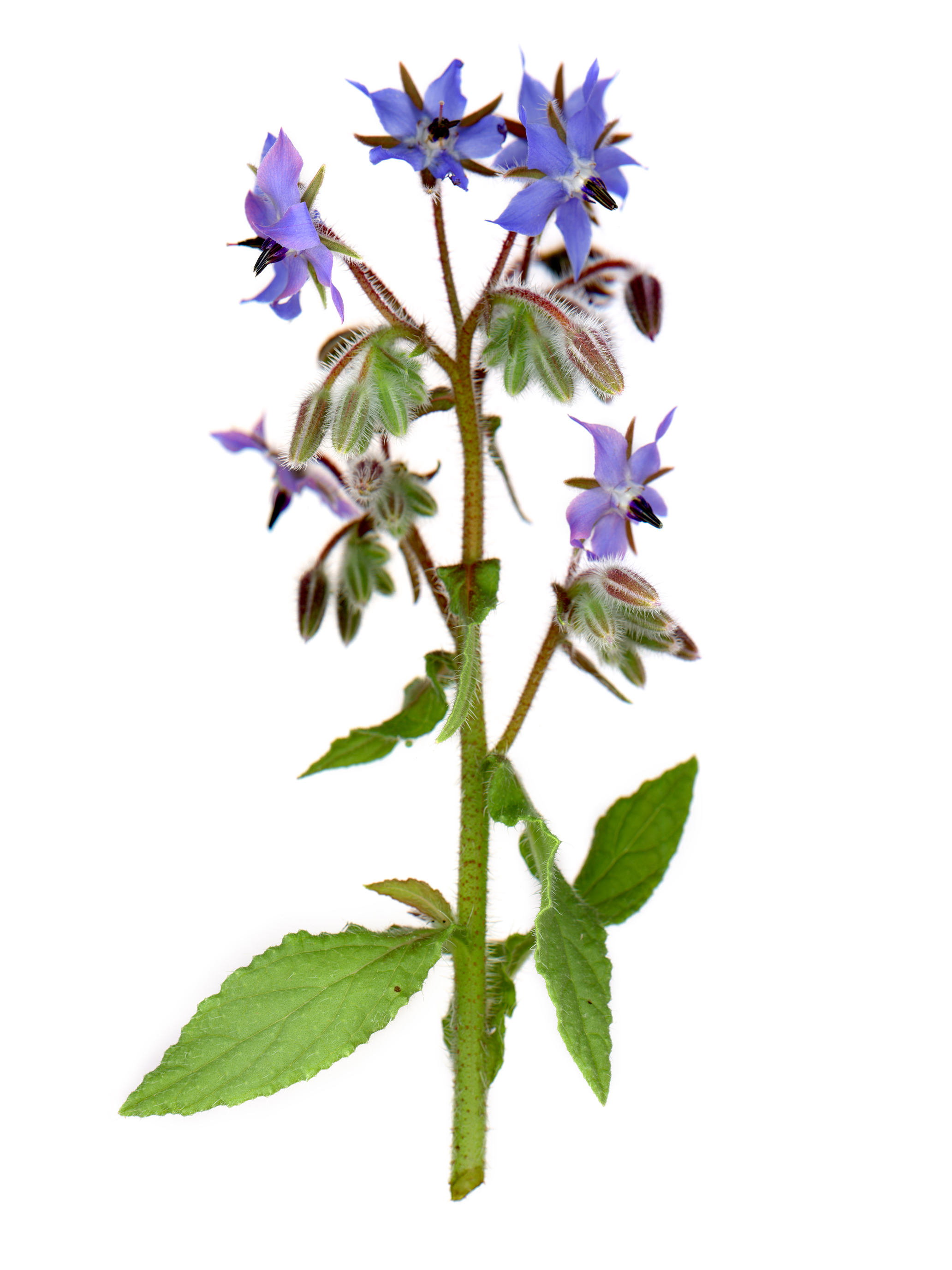
Borage stem

== Description ==
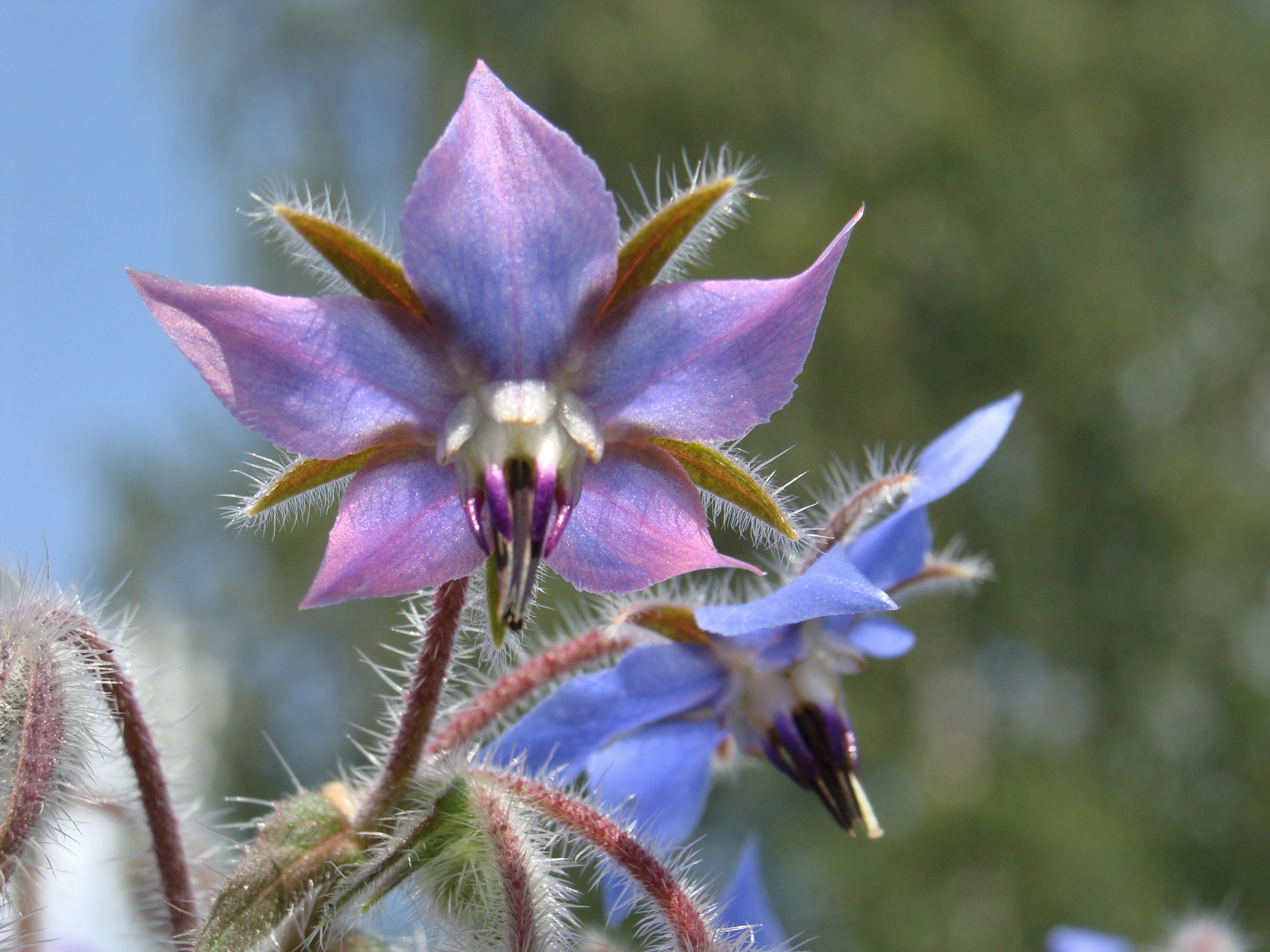
B. officinalis flower

B. officinalis grows to a height of 60 centimetres (2 feet), and is bristly or hairy all over the stems and leaves; the leaves are alternate, simple, and 5–15 cm (2–6 inches) long.

The flowers are complete, perfect with five narrow, triangular-pointed petals. Flowers are most often blue, although pink flowers are sometimes observed. White-flowered types are also cultivated, but the blue flower is genetically dominant over them. The flowers arise along scorpioid cymes to form large floral displays with multiple flowers blooming simultaneously, suggesting that borage has a high degree of geitonogamy (intraplant pollination). It has an indeterminate growth habit. In temperate climates such as in the United Kingdom, its flowering season is relatively long, from June to September. In milder climates, it blooms continuously for most of the year.

=== Chemistry ===
The seeds consist of 26–38% borage seed oil, of which 17–28% is gamma-linolenic acid (GLA, an omega-6 fatty acid), making borage seed oil the richest known source of GLA. The oil also contains the fatty acids palmitic acid (10–11%), stearic acid (3.5–4.5%), oleic acid (16–20%), linoleic acid (35–38%), eicosenoic acid (3.5–5.5%), erucic acid (1.5–3.5%), and nervonic acid (1.5%).

The leaves contain small amounts (2–10 ppm in the dried herb) of the liver-toxic pyrrolizidine alkaloids (PA) intermedine, lycopsamine, amabiline, and supinine and the nontoxic saturated PA thesinine. PAs are also present in borage seed oil, but may be removed by processing.

== Distribution and habitat ==
Borage is native to the Mediterranean region, though it has become naturalized in many other locales. It grows satisfactorily in gardens in most of Europe, such as Denmark, France, Germany, Ireland, and the UK. Although an annual, it will persist in the garden from year to year through ready self-seeding.

== Ecology ==
The flowers produce copious nectar, which is used by honeybees to make a light and delicate honey.

It can be invasive.

== Toxicity ==
In addition to the liver-toxic pyrrolizidine alkaloids (PAs) found in the leaves and seed oil, the German Federal Institute for Risk Assessment has advised that honey from borage contains PAs, transferred to the honey through pollen collected from the flowers, and recommends that commercial honey production select for raw honey with limited PA content to prevent contamination.

There has been a single reported case of status epilepticus associated with borage oil ingestion.

== Uses ==
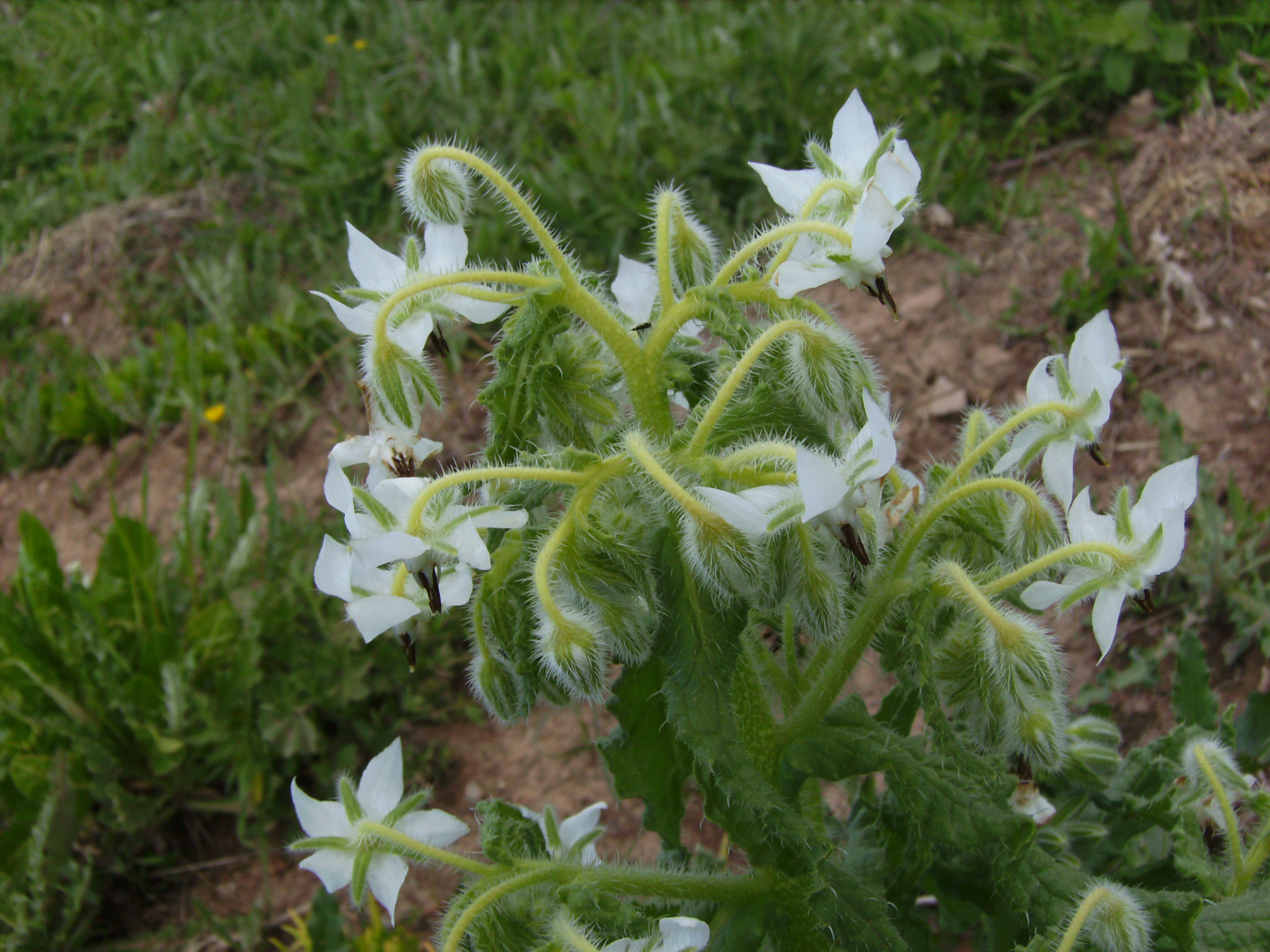
A white-flower cultivar

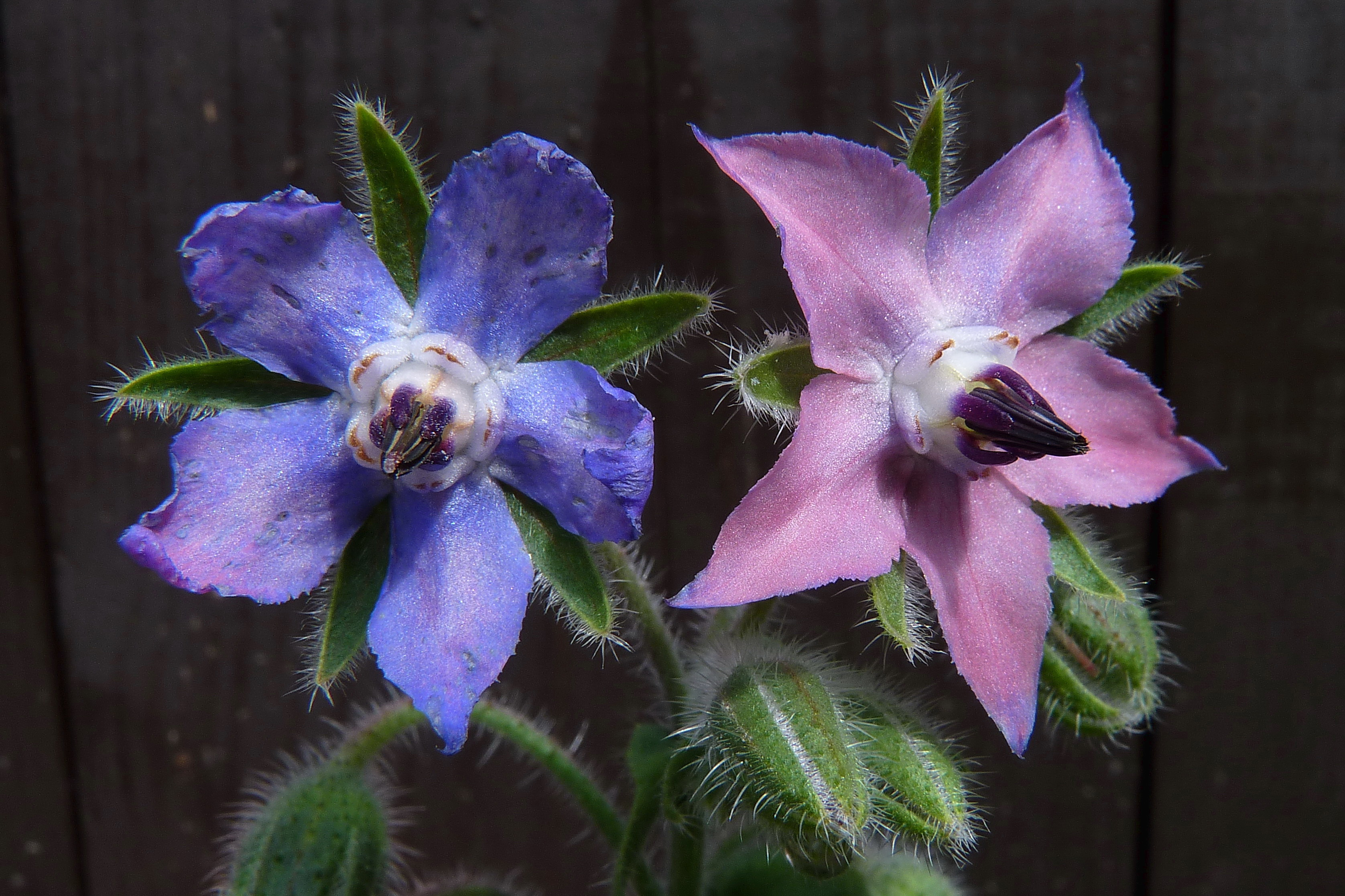
Two blossoms: the younger one is pink, the older blue.

Borage was traditionally cultivated for culinary and medicinal uses, but its modern commercial cultivation is mainly as an oilseed.

=== Culinary ===
Borage is also used as either a fresh vegetable or a dried herb. As fresh borage has a cucumber-like taste, it is often used in salads or as a garnish. The flower has a sweet, honey-like taste and may be used to decorate desserts and cocktails, and is sometimes frozen inside ice cubes.

Vegetable use of borage is common in Germany, in the Spanish regions of Aragón and Navarre, on the Greek island of Crete, and in the northern Italian region of Liguria. Although often used in soups, one of the better known German borage recipes is the Frankfurt speciality grüne Soße ("green sauce"). In Italy, borage is always eaten cooked, and is most commonly used to fill ravioli in the regions of Campania and Liguria. It is used to flavour pickled gherkins in Poland and Russia.

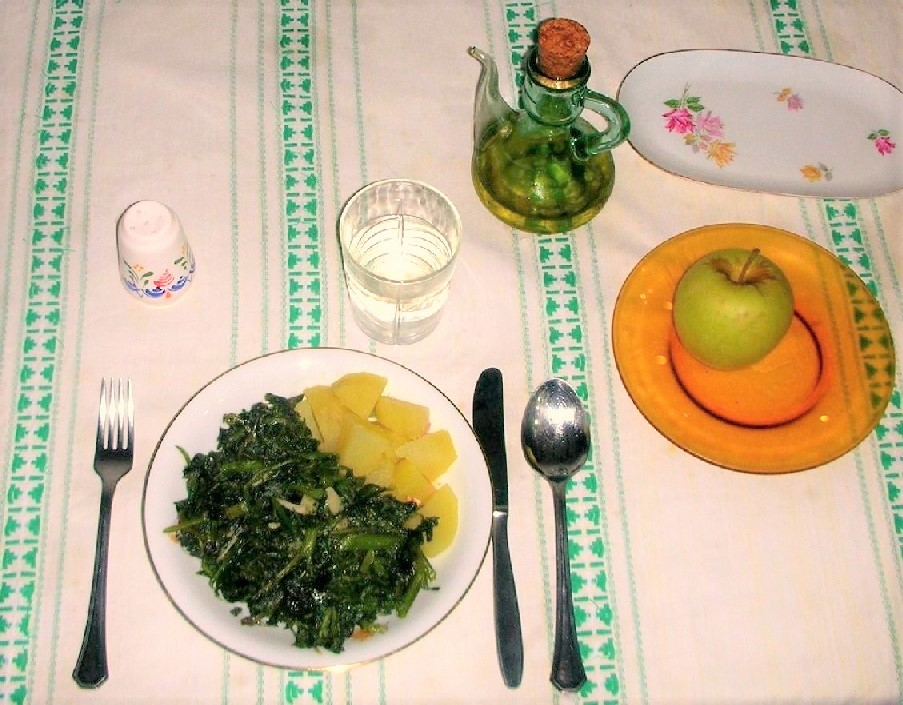
In Aragonese cuisine, borage boiled and sautéed with garlic is served with potatoes.

==== Beverage ====
Borage was a traditional garnish in the Pimms Cup cocktail, but is now generally replaced by mint or a long sliver of cucumber peel. It is also one of the key botanicals in Gilpin's Westmorland Extra Dry Gin. The author of Cups and their Customs notes that a sprig or two of borage "communicates a peculiar refreshing flavour" to any cool drink.

In Persian cuisine, borage tea (using the dried purple flowers) is called گل گاوزبان : gol gâvzabân, "cow's-tongue-flower".

=== Medicine ===
Traditionally, borage has been used to treat hyperactive gastrointestinal, respiratory and cardiovascular disorders, such as gastrointestinal (colic, cramps, diarrhea), airways (asthma, bronchitis), cardiovascular, (cardiotonic, antihypertensive and blood purifier), urinary (diuretic and kidney/bladder disorders).

A methanol extract of borage has shown strong amoebicidal activity in vitro. The 50% inhibitory concentration (LD_{50}) of the extract against Entamoeba histolytica was 33 μg/mLl.

Healthy adults typically produce ample gamma-linolenic acid (GLA) from dietary linoleic acid, but borage seed oil is often marketed as a GLA supplement under the names "starflower oil" or "borage oil".

=== Companion planting ===
Borage is used in companion planting. It is said to protect or nurse legumes, spinach, brassicas, and strawberries. It is also employed as a trap crop for tomatoes as it confuses female tomato hornworm and manduca moths during egg-laying. Claims that borage improves tomato growth and taste remain unsubstantiated.

== In culture ==
Pliny the Elder and Dioscorides said that borage was the nepenthe (νηπενθές : nēpenthés) mentioned in Homer, which caused forgetfulness when mixed with wine.

King Henry VIII's last wife, Catherine Parr, used borage in a concoction to treat melancholy.

Francis Bacon thought that borage had "an excellent spirit to repress the fuliginous vapour of dusky melancholie".

John Gerard's Herball mentions an old verse concerning the plant: Ego Borago, Gaudia semper ago ('I, Borage, bring always joys'). He asserts:

Those of our time do use the flowers in salads to exhilerate and make the mind glad. There be also many things made of these used everywhere for the comfort of the heart, for the driving away of sorrow and increasing the joy of the mind. The leaves and flowers of Borage put into wine make men and women glad and merry and drive away all sadness, dullness and melancholy, as Dioscorides and Pliny affirm. Syrup made of the flowers of Borage comfort the heart, purge melancholy and quiet the frantic and lunatic person. The leaves eaten raw engender good blood, especially in those that have been lately sick.

== See also ==
- List of companion plants
