= List of tequilas =

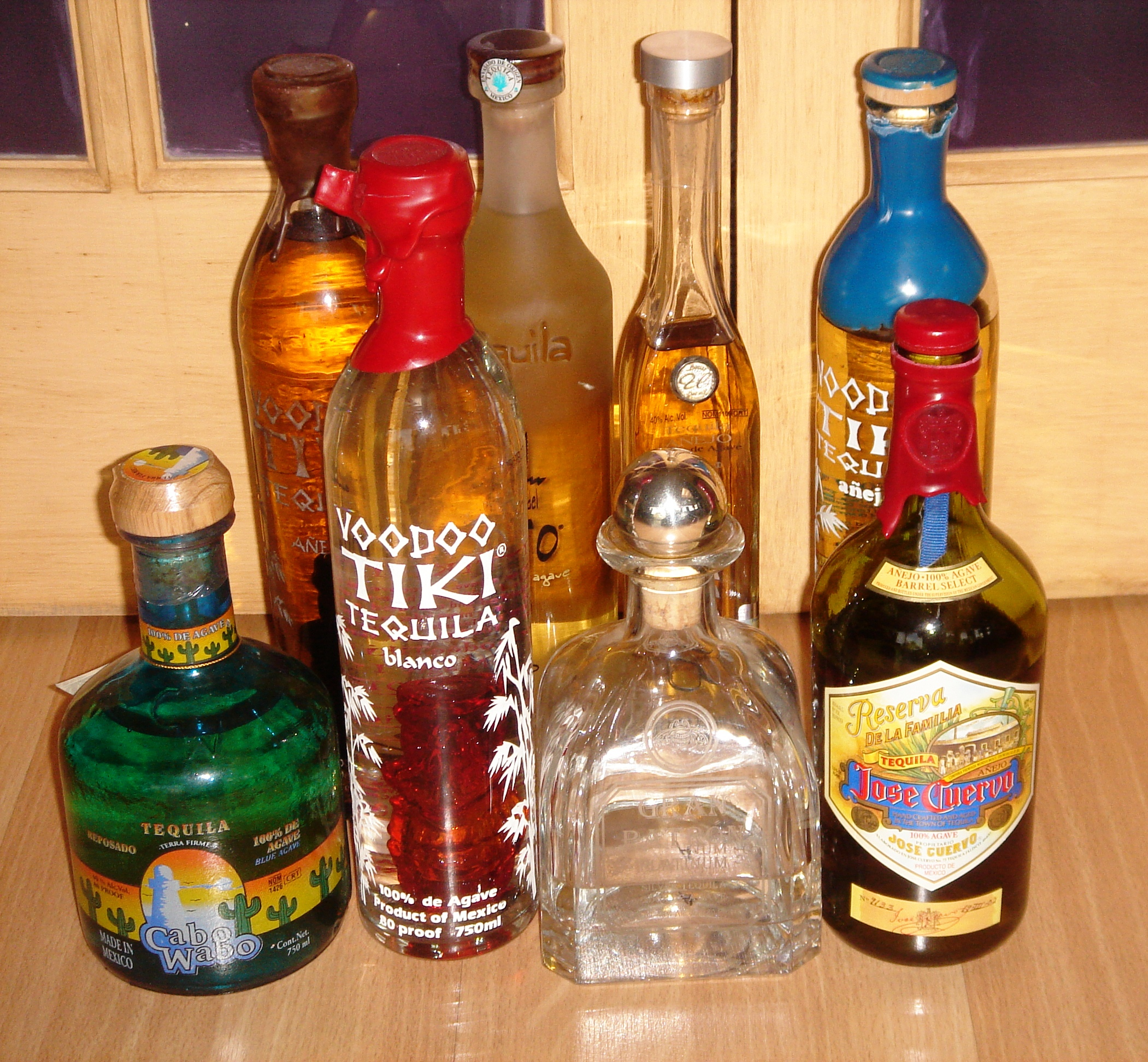
Assorted tequilas

This is a list of tequilas, including some of the many brands of tequila, both current and former. The year production first began is given when known.

In 2025, the Tequila Regulatory Council (Consejo Regulador del Tequila) listed 360 certified producers of tequila, 2,525 domestic brands of tequila, and 812 tequila brands bottled abroad.

== 0–9 ==
- 1519 Tequila (2013)
- 1800 Tequila (1975)
- 4 Copas

== A ==
- Astral Tequila
- Avión tequila

== C ==
- Casamigos (2013)
- Casa Dragones (2009)
- Casa Noble (1776)
- Chaya tequila
- Cincoro Tequila (2019)
- Corralejo
- Corzo
- Cruz Tequila (2005)

== D ==
- DeLeón Tequila (2008)
- Don Julio (1942)
- Dos Lunas Tequila (2006)

== E ==
- El Tesoro tequila (1990)
- Espolon (1998)
- El Jimador

== G ==
- Gran Coramino

== H ==
- Hacienda San José de Miravalle (1870) (defunct)
- Herradura (1870s)
- Hornitos (1950)

== J ==
- Jose Cuervo (1795)

== K ==
- Kirkland Signature

== L ==
- Lunazul (2002)

== M ==
- Maestro Dobel Tequila (2008)

== O ==
- Olmeca Tequila (1967)

== P ==
- Patrón (1989)

== S ==
- San José Tequila
- Santera Tequila (2015)
- Sauza Tequila (1873)
- Señor Río (2009)
- Siembra Azul (2005)
- Sol de Mexico Tequila (1950s)

== T ==
- Tequila 125 (2008)
- Tres Agaves (2008)
- Tres Generaciones (1973)

== See also ==
- List of gins
- List of rum producers
- List of vodkas
- List of whisky brands
