= American Distilling Institute =

- Formation: 2003; 23 years ago
- Founder: Bill Owens
- Type: California LLC
- Purpose: Education, conference, competition
- Headquarters: Hayward, CA
- Location: United States
- Services: Membership, education, conference, spirits competition
- Fields: Beverage Alcohol
- Official language: English
- President: Erik Owens
- Staff: 5
- Website: distilling.com

The American Distilling Institute (ADI), is a professional association for the craft / micro distillery industry in the United States representing the over 2600 licensed craft distilleries operating in the United States.

== History ==
The American Distilling Institute was the United States' first association for the craft distillery industry since prohibition. It was founded in 2003 when there were only ~25 craft distilleries as state regulations in the United States eased and began to allow small distilleries to operate again. Prior to prohibition, there were over 2000 local distilleries. However, after prohibition was lifted, careful management of government regulation (the three tier system) by the largest distilleries and wholesalers to minimize competition blocked most distilleries from reopening.

== Membership ==
ADI's membership comprises mainly small to mid-sized distilleries and their employees.

== Annual conference ==
The first conference was held in 2004 at St. George Distillery in Alameda, CA.

== International spirits competition ==
The American Distilling Institute has held its annual spirits competition since 2007 and is the oldest and largest craft spirits competition. Distillers from all over the world submit entries which are blind tasted and evaluated by experts in the Spirits industry. All entries are scored and feedback is provided on all entries. Results for best in class winners are announced at the annual Awards Gala.

Awards:

Best of Category

Best of Class

Excellence in Packaging Awards: awarded to a gold medal bottle

Bronze, Silver, Gold and Double Gold Medals

== Craft spirits awards ==
Announcement of the Distillery of the Year Award called the "Bubble Cap" award (a reference to a distilling device called a bubble cap) happens annually at the conference gala.

Bubble Cap Awards: Awarded to Distillery of the Year

2024 Bubble Cap Award

- Distillery of the Year – St Augustine Distillery

2023 Bubble Cap Award

- Distillery of the Year – Garrison Brothers Distillery

2022 Bubble Cap Award

- Distillery of the Year – New Liberty Distillery

2021 Bubble Cap Award

- Distillery of the Year – Ironroot Republic Distillery

2020 Bubble Cap Award

- Distillery of the Year – Spirit Works Distillery

2019 Bubble Cap Award

- Distillery of the Year – Golden Moon Distillery

2018 Bubble Cap Awards

- Distillery of the Year – Copperworks Distilling, Founders Micah Nutt and Jason Parker.
- Lifetime Achievement Award – Hubert Germain-Robin, Master Distiller, Master Blender & Spirits Consultant
- Best Farm Distillery – Sourland Mountain Spirits, Founder Ray Disch
- Best Distillery Experience – Lost Spirits, Founder Bryan Davis

2017 Bubble Cap Award

- Distillery of the Year – Cedar Ridge Winery and Distillery

2016 Bubble Cap Award

- Distillery of the Year – Kings County Distillery

2015 Bubble Cap Award

- Distillery of the Year – Leopold Bros.

2014 Bubble Cap Award

- Distillery of the Year – Corsair Artisan Distillery

2013 Bubble Cap Award

- Distillery of the Year – Montanya Distillers

2012 Bubble Cap Award

- Distillery of the Year – Peach Street Distillers

2011 Bubble Cap Award

- Distillery of the Year – Dry Fly Distilling

2010 Bubble Cap Award

- Distillery of the Year – Tuthilltown Spirits

2009 Bubble Cap Award

- Distillery of the Year – Starlight Distillery

2008 Bubble Cap Award

- Distillery of the Year – St. George Spirits

== Annual craft distillery directory ==
Every year, the Distiller's Resource Directory is published and distributed at the annual conference. The directory contains two primary sections. The first section is a listing of every active craft distillery. The second section is good and services needed to own and operate a craft distillery.

== Distiller Magazine ==
A trade magazine focusing on news, research, and education in the craft distilling industry.
