= Boodles =

Boodles or Boodle's may refer to:

- Boodles (company), a British luxury jewellery company
- Boodle's, a gentlemen's club in St. James's Street, London
- Boodles British Gin
- Boodles Challenge, an annual tennis tournament in England
- Boodles Boxing Ball, an annual society ball in London, England.

== See also ==
- Boodle
