= Leopold Bros. =

Distillery in Denver, Colorado, U.S.

- Type: Private
- Industry: Distilled beverages
- Founded: Ann Arbor, Michigan (1999)
- Headquarters: Denver, Colorado
- Key people: Scott Leopold, Todd Leopold
- Products: Gin; Vodka; Absinthe; Fernet; Whiskey; Liqueur; Aperitivo
- Website: www.leopoldbros.com

Leopold Bros. is a family-owned and operated distillery located in Denver, Colorado. They are well known as an independent distillery that floor malts, mills, mashes, and ferments all the grains in their spirits, as well as distills, ages, and bottles their entire portfolio at their one and only distillery in northeast Denver. They currently have the largest traditional floor malting room of any distillery in the United States, where they malt Colorado barley onsite.

Leopold Bros distills over twenty hand-numbered, small-batch products, all made from scratch and natural ingredients, which are distributed in over twenty states, the District of Columbia, and parts of Europe. Among the distinctive methods used by Leopold Bros. is the separate distillation of each botanical used in flavoring its products prior to blending and final distillation. Many have won awards in international competitions.

== History ==
Brothers Scott and Todd Leopold, opened a brewpub on South Main Street at the site of a renovated brake factory in Ann Arbor, Michigan in 1999. Later, operations expanded to include a micro-distillery. Todd Leopold, brew- and still-master for the brewery, after graduating from the Siebel Institute of Technology in Chicago, interned in four German breweries, and went to distilling school in Lexington, Kentucky. Scott Leopold, an environmental engineer, was crucial in the design stages attempting to create as near a zero-pollution factory as possible. The microbrewery operated as an "eco-brewery" using organic hops and barley, and used equipment and procedures designed to reduce wastewater and other waste by-products in the beer-making process.

Leopold Bros. closed its Ann Arbor location in the Spring of 2008 and relocated to Denver. After relocating, the distillery discontinued brewing and began operating solely as a micro-distillery. To keep up with exploding demand, Leopold Bros. opened a new facility with triple the production capacity of their previous facility, which also includes one of only a few malting floors at a distillery outside of Scotland. Many have won awards in international competitions They received Distillery of the Year award from the American Distilling Institute in 2015.

=== Spirits ===
- American Small-Batch Gin: Gold Medal, San Francisco World Spirits Competition
- Leopold's Summer Gin
- Navy Strength American Gin: Gold Medal, Beverage Tasting Institute; Winner, Good Food Awards
- Aperitivo
- Absinthe Verte: Silver Medal, 2008 London International Wine and Spirits Competition; Bronze Medal, 2009 San Francisco World Spirits Competition
- Fernet Leopold - Highland Amaro: Gold Medal, San Francisco World Spirits Competition
- Silver Tree American Small-Batch Vodka: Gold Medal, 2009 San Francisco World Spirits Competition; Silver Medal, 2007 San Francisco World Spirits Competition; Gold Medal, 2006 Beverage Tasting Institute
- Thomas & Leopold Single Barrel Dark Rum Discontinued
- Pisco (Gold Medal, 2009 San Francisco World Spirits Competition) Discontinued

=== Whiskies ===
- American Small Batch Whiskey
- Maryland-Style Rye Whiskey
- Rocky Mountain Blackberry Flavored Whiskey
- Rocky Mountain Peach Flavored Whiskey
- New York Apple Flavored Whiskey
- Michigan Cherry Whiskey
- Georgia Peach Flavored Whiskey

=== Liqueurs ===
- Rocky Mountain Blackberry: Gold Medal, 2006 Beverage Tasting Institute; Silver Medal, 2009 San Francisco World Spirits Competition
- New York Sour Apple: Gold Medal, 2007 Beverage Tasting Institute
- New England Cranberry: Best in Show, Fruit Liqueurs 2009 San Francisco World Spirits Competition; Gold Medal, 2007 Beverage Tasting Institute;
- French Press-Style American Coffee: Silver Medal, 2007 Beverage Tasting Institute; Silver Medal, 2007 San Francisco World Spirits Competition
- Rocky Mountain Peach: Gold Medal, 2007 Beverage Tasting Institute; Bronze Medal, 2007 San Francisco World Spirits Competition
- Michigan Tart Cherry: Gold Medal, 2007 Beverage Tasting Institute; Bronze Medal, 2009 San Francisco World Spirits Competition
- Three Pins Alpine Herbal: Gold Medal, 2007 Beverage Tasting Institute; Silver Medal, 2007 San Francisco World Spirits Competition; Bronze Medal, 2009 San Francisco World Spirits Competition
- American Orange Liqueur: Gold Medal, Beverage Tasting Institute
- Maraschino Liqueur: Winner, Good Food Awards

== See also ==
- malt house
- Peach Street Distillers
