= Santero =

Santero (feminine form santera, Spanish for "saint-maker") may refer to:

- An artisan who creates santos y revultos and other Spanish-style religious artwork
- A priest in the Santería religion
- Santera Tequila, a brand of tequila
