= Hangar 1 Vodka =

American vodka brand

Hangar One Vodka
- Type: Vodka
- Manufacturer: Proximo Spirits
- Origin: United States
- Introduced: 2002
- Alcohol by volume: 40%
- Proof (US): 80
- Related products: List of vodkas
- Website: www.hangarone.com

Hangar 1 Vodka is a vodka brand produced by The Hangar 1 Distillery in Alameda, California. In addition to vodka, the distillery also produces spirits, some of which were formerly produced by St. George Spirits. The brand is owned and distributed by Proximo Spirits of Jersey City, New Jersey, and is available as a straight vodka as well as in a variety of flavors.

== History ==
St. George Spirits was founded as America's first eau de vie distillery in 1982 by Jörg Rupf. Rupf grew up in Germany's Black Forest to a family of distillers. He went into law and became, at the time, Germany's youngest judge. On a visit to the University of California at Berkeley in the late 1970s, he decided to stay and distill local fruit to produce eau de vie. In August 2001, Rupf met with fellow artisan distiller Ansley Coale, president of Craft Distillers and a collaborator in Germain-Robin brandy, to discuss producing flavored vodkas using a method similar to the production of eau de vie.

Hangar 1 Vodka was founded in 2001, with Rupf overseeing production and Coale handling design and marketing. Operations were initially based in St. George's distillery in Hangar 1, a 2,000 square-foot World War II-era hangar at the old Alameda Naval Air Station, before expanding to a 60,000 square-foot hangar in Alameda, California, in 2004. In April 2010, Hangar 1 Vodka was acquired by Proximo Spirits, who continued to produce the vodka in Alameda through St. George. until the Summer of 2014. It is now produced in the building next to St George's distillery which it shares with Faction Brewery.

== Description ==
Hangar 1 is a small batch vodka made from a blend of pot-distilled Viognier grapes and column still-distilled American wheat. The flavored varieties are created by infusing the vodka base with fresh fruit, and then distilling the vodka in a pot still. The fruits are obtained in-season from farms throughout the US. The distillation process takes about four weeks per batch from start to finish. Hangar 1's flavored vodkas contain fruits including Kaffir lime and Buddha's Hand citron, as well as experimental flavors such as Chipotle.

== Varieties ==
Name	ABV	Flavor	Notes
Straight	40%	Unflavored	Blend of Viognier eau de vie with spirit made from Midwestern wheat.
Mandarin Blossom	40%	Orange	Made with the blossoms from mandarin orange trees.
Buddha's Hand Citron	40%	Lemon	Made with the rare Buddha's hand citron variety typically used for its fragrance.
Kaffir Lime	40%	Lime	A lime typically used in Southeast Asian cuisine, Hangar 1 distills the kaffir lime leaves and skin.
Maine Wild Blueberry	40%	Blueberry	Made with small wild blueberries from Maine, introduced in 2011.
Fraser River Raspberry	40%	Raspberry	Limited edition, made with raspberries from the Fraser River valley.
Spiced Pear	40%	Pear	Limited edition, seasonally made with pears from Colorado blended with spices such as cinnamon and nutmeg.
Chipotle	40%	Jalapeños and chipotles	Made with a blend of jalepeños, chipotles, habaneros, and bell and purple morita chili peppers. Introduced in 2007 as part of the Alchemist Series, widely available since 2011.
Wasabi	40%	Wasabi	Made in 2006 as part of the limited release Alchemist Series; no longer available.

== Ratings ==
The Fraser River Raspberry flavor received a score of 96–100 from Wine Enthusiast in 2005, while Mandarin Blossom received a score of 97 in 2010, the Straight variety was given a score of 93 one year later, and Maine Wild Blueberry a 92 the year after that.

== Marketing ==
In May 2011, a 120-foot-long Hangar 1 Vodka blimp was introduced, touring the US to promote the vodka. It set off on a six-month tour in 2011, with stops in 30 different cities. In August 2011, during a thunderstorm, the blimp broke free of its moorings in Columbus, Ohio, and landed in a 94-year-old Ohio woman's backyard. The blimp was repaired and continued its tour through California in 2012. It provided some of the coverage for California sporting events, including San Francisco Giants games.
