= Germain-Robin =

Germain-Robin, based in Ukiah, California, is a maker of brandy.

== History ==
The distillery was founded in 1982 by Ansley J. Coale Jr., a local rancher, and Hubert Germain-Robin, a native of Cognac, France.

Coale, a former Berkeley professor of ancient history and son of Princeton demographer Ansley Coale, Sr., had bought 2,000 acres (809 ha) of farmland outside of Ukiah named Eagle Ridge Ranch in 1973. By chance, one day in 1981 he picked up Germain-Robin, who was hitchhiking throughout California in search of a location to make brandy. Germain-Robin came from a family that had been making cognac under the name Jules Robin & Company but had recently sold the business to Martell, prompting Germain-Robin to leave.

Ronald Reagan was an aficionado of Germain-Robin brandies and reserved a number of barrels for the White House that he served as a matter of national pride to visiting dignitaries, such as Mikhail Gorbachev and François Mitterrand. The brandy was also served at Bill Clinton's inaugural ball.

Differing from the Cognac brandies he made earlier in his life, which were made mostly of the Ugni blanc grape (which many in the region found unpalatable as a wine), Germain-Robin used high-quality wine grapes. Initially, they primarily used locally produced Pinot noir, and they later added Colombard, Semillon, Zinfandel and Viognier to their stocks, exclusively sourced from Mendocino County. In addition to blends, Germain-Robin produces single-varietal and single-vineyard brandies.

In 2006, Germain-Robin left the company to become an independent consultant and run seminars and workshops with the American Distilling Institute. He wrote the book Traditional Distillation, Art & Passion.

In August 2017, Germain-Robin was purchased by E & J Gallo for an undisclosed sum.

== Products ==
Germain-Robin brandy, which is called by some the best in the world, is produced in very small quantities (3,000 cases per year as of 2017). Sales are low due to poor name recognition, high price of up to $600 per bottle, and the tendency of restaurant patrons to buy well-known mass-market brands from France. Still, the brandies can be found nationwide in most large cities, and in some small ones as well.

Particularly in recent years, the distillery has been experimenting with grappa, eau de vie, liqueur, and other liquors. In 2007, Mr. Coale produced a Syrah/Zinfandel grappa that garnered his first 5-star outstanding rating from Paul Pacult. He has since seen many of these for his blends.

Coale was also a participant in Hangar One Vodka, an artisan vodka made in Alameda, California, by St. George Spirits. The interest was sold, and now vodkas, gins and whiskies are made at the Germain-Robin Distillery, with space given to its makers, American Craft Whiskey Distillery and Tamar Distillery.
