= Three Olives Vodka =

Brand of British alcoholic drink

- Type: Vodka
- Distributor: Proximo Spirits
- Origin: 1998 to 2022 United Kingdom; 2023 to present United States of America
- Introduced: 1998
- Alcohol by volume: 30% (flavored); 40% (unflavored)
- Proof (US): 60 – 80
- Related products: List of vodkas
- Website: threeolives.com

Three Olives Vodka is a brand of vodka originally produced and distilled in the United Kingdom. The brand is owned and distributed by Proximo Spirits of Jersey City, New Jersey. As of the new 2023 reformulation and rebranding, Three Olives Vodka is now produced in the United States of America. Other material changes include that Three Olives Vodka is distilled five times and its unflavored expression is made with three ingredients - water, grain and yeast.

== History ==
Three Olives Vodka was founded by Guillaume Cuvelier in London in 1998, and acquired by Proximo Spirits in 2007. In 2018, Three Olives launched a Rosé flavored expression. However, everything changed after a 2023 reformulation with new liquid and design. The vodkas are now manufactured in the USA.

== Production and Products ==
Old Formulation (1998 - 2022)

Three Olives Vodka is made from quadruple-distilled winter wheat harvested in England. The vodka is handcrafted and is available as a clear unflavored vodka as well as a variety of infused vodkas. The flavored vodkas are made using the circulation method, where the vodka flows into the flavored liquid to create the flavored vodka. The water used is sourced from a lake in Wales that was created by a dam that flooded in 1888, submerging an old village.

Three Olives unflavored vodka is 40% alcohol by volume (80 proof). Nearly all Three Olives flavored vodka types are 35% abv (70 proof).

New Formulation (2023 - present)

The new liquid is distilled five times and the flavored expressions use natural flavors. The New Three Olives Vodka in Made in America. According to the manufacturer, the vodkas are 100 calories or less, have zero sugar, no gluten. Original Unflavored is 40% ABV, while flavored vodkas are 30% ABV.

== Three Olives Varieties ==
Name	ABV	Flavor
Unflavored	40%	None
Loopy	30%	Fruity with orange, berry, lime
Berry	30%	Blueberry, blackberry, strawberry
Grape	30%	Juicy Concord grape
Cherry	30%	Dark cherries
Espresso	30%	Espresso coffee
Citrus	30%	Lemon, lime and tangerine
Orange	30%	Fresh-squeezed orange
Vanilla	30%	Creamy vanilla bean
Mango	30%	Mango
Rosé	30%	French semi-sweet wine
Raspberry	30%	Raspberry

== Advertising and Marketing ==
In 2013, Three Olives launched a $20 million international print, billboard and digital advertising campaign starring actor Clive Owen. The ads feature atmospheric stills of Owen in a variety of London locations, reflecting the vodka's British origin. That same year, Three Olives partnered with the estate of Marilyn Monroe to create a Marilyn Monroe Strawberry Vodka, with a strawberries and cream flavor. The bottle's label featured a classic image of Monroe standing over a subway grate as the wind ruffles her white dress. The deal was a three-year license that expired in January 2016, hence the Strawberry vodka had dropped the Monroe name during 2015 production. Proximo previously launched a $10 million animated campaign for the vodka in 2011, and their grape-flavored Purple vodka was endorsed by rapper Lil' Kim in a 2010 national ad campaign.
