= Norma Oficial Mexicana =

Governmental compulsory standards in Mexico

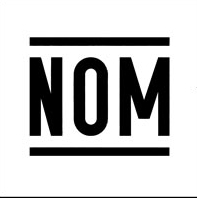
Norma Oficial Mexicana logo.

The Norma Oficial Mexicana (Official Mexican Standard), abbreviated NOM, is the name of each of a series of official, compulsory standards and regulations for diverse activities in Mexico. They are more commonly referred to as NOMs or normas.

The standards are prepared by the Dirección General de Normas (DGN) (Directorate-General of Standards), which is the body representing Mexico in the International Organization for Standardization (ISO).

== Examples ==
=== Tequila ===
In the case of tequila, Mexico's Tequila Regulatory Council (CRT) regulates production NOMs. The NOM identifier means the tequila meets government standards - but this is not any guarantee of tequila's quality. However, without the NOM stamp of legitimacy, it is not guaranteed that the bottle contains tequila.

All 100% agave tequilas must have a NOM identifier on the bottle. The important laws since 1990 were NOM-006-SCFI-1993 and the later update NOM-006-SCFI-1994 revised in late 2005 NOM-006-SCFI-2005 and the most recent revision in 2012.

The number after NOM is the distillery number, assigned by the government. NOM does not indicate the location of the distillery, merely the parent company or - in the case where a company leases space in a plant - the physical plant where the tequila was manufactured.

=== Environment ===
NOM-137-SEMARNAT-2003 - Issued on the Official Gazette on April 29, 2003, and related to atmospheric pollution, gas desulfurizing plants and sour condensate, and control of emissions of sulfur compounds.
