= Tres Agaves =

- Type: Tequila, Cocktail Mixes
- Manufacturer: Tres Agaves Products, LLC.
- Origin: Mexico
- Introduced: 2008
- Proof (US): 80
- Variants: Blanco, Reposado, Añejo, Organic Margarita Mix, Organic Strawberry Margarita Mix, Organic Bloody Mary Mix, Organic Cocktail-Ready Agave Nectar, Organic Ready-To-Drink Margaritas

Tres Agaves is a brand of organic 100% de Agave Tequila and Margarita mixes. The Tequila is produced at Tres Agaves' distillery in the town of Amatitán located in Jalisco, Mexico.

Tres Agaves Tequilas are made from 100% Blue Agave by a family-owned distillery. Tres Agaves Products Inc. produces three varieties of Tequila: Blanco, Reposado and Añejo. Additionally, the company offers four alcohol-free mixer products: Tres Agaves Organic Margarita Mix, Tres Agaves Organic Strawberry Margarita Mix, Tres Agaves Cocktail-Ready Agave Nectar, and Tres Agaves Organic Bloody Mary Mix.

== History ==
=== The Early Days ===
Tres Agaves Products LLC. was founded in 2008, at CEO and Founder Barry Augus' dining room table. Along with a small team, Barry wrote the first business plan and the original bottle design. The operation was initially funded by Barry's family inheritance, allowing him and his team to purchase their first Tequila bottle mold. The company started by selling cocktail-ready agave nectar out of Barry's minivan, hand delivering every order. In 2010, the company's first case of Tequila shipped to the US from Mexico and sold just a week later. Their three Tequila varieties were originally crafted at the El Llano distillery ( NOM: 1109) in Jalisco, which began production in 1900.

=== 2012 to 2016: Partnership with Trinchero Family Estates ===
In late 2012, Tres Agaves entered into a sales and marketing partnership with Trinchero Family Estates. The venture made sense both in a business and a cultural sense. The joint venture allowed Trinchero to enter into the spirits business and gave Tres Agaves the ability to focus on product development while Trinchero brought Tres Agaves into more markets through its robust sales and distribution network. Of great importance was the cultural importance of family in both organizations, with Trinchero being the second largest family owned winery in the world, and family and friends having enabled Barry to start and grow his business.

=== 2016 to Today: The Tres Agaves Distillery ===
In 2016, Tres Agaves purchased land from the Partida family, Barry having known and worked with David Partida for the last 20 years. The purchase allowed Tres Agaves to control its own destiny, by building a home to bring in complete control of its Tequila production operations and become a cultural site for the company and industry. Located on a plot of land in Amatitán, a town minutes outside of the town of Tequila, the Tres Agaves distillery has state-of-the-art production facilities, including a 22-ton autoclave, a four-stage roller mill and stainless steel fermentation tanks. In addition to these, the distillery has traditional production methods on site, including a tahona wheel and a stone horno.

==== Iliana Partida - Maestra Tequilera ====
In 2018, Tres Agaves appointed Iliana Partida as master distiller - or Maestra Tequilera - of its new distillery. A member of the Partida family, Iliana was taught by her father to produce Tequila, a tradition of the Partida's spanning four generations. In taking this role, Iliana becomes one of the very few women to be a master distillery in the Tequila industry. In fact, according to The New York Times, there are only 12 other Maestra Tequileras in Mexico at this time.

== Critical reviews ==
Tres Agaves' Tequilas have been evaluated by numerous spirits ratings competitions including the Ultimate Spirits Challenge, the Beverage Testing Institute, TheFiftyBest.com, the International Spirits Challenge and others. Their Añejo variety was awarded the Chairman's Trophy at the 2010 Ultimate Spirits Challenge with a score of 97/100.
