= 1800 Tequila =

Mexican tequila brand

- Type: Tequila Silver / Reposado / Añejo / Extra-Añejo / Cristalino / Flavored Tequilas
- Manufacturer: 1800 Tequila, Jalisco, Mexico
- Distributor: Proximo Spirits Inc
- Origin: Mexico
- Introduced: 1967
- Alcohol by volume: 35–50% abv
- Proof (US): 70–100
- Related products: List of tequilas
- Website: 1800tequila.com

1800 Tequila is a Mexican brand of tequila owned by the Beckmann family, who also own the Jose Cuervo tequila brand. The blue agave tequila is bottled in Jalisco, Mexico. 1800 is named after the year tequila was first aged in oak casks, and is sold throughout the world. In the United States, the brand is distributed by the Beckmann family's company, Proximo Spirits.

== History ==
The first licensed tequila manufacturer was Jose Antonio Cuervo of Jalisco, Mexico, in 1758, after he was given the rights by King Ferdinand VI of Spain to cultivate a portion of land. Shortly thereafter, the production of tequila was banned, until 1795, when King Carlos IV lifted the ban. 1800 is widely known as the year in which tequila was first successfully aged in wood.

Originally known as Cuervo 1800 Tequila, 1800 Tequila was launched in 1967 as a sipping tequila. The brand launched with the introduction of 1800 Añejo on December 4, 1967. The Silver and Reposado labels were later introduced in 2004. Since 2008, it has been distributed in the US by Proximo Spirits. That year, the Select Silver label was introduced, a 100 proof clear tequila. In 2006, 1800 introduced The Ultimate Margarita, 19.9 proof pre-mixed margarita mix made with blue agave tequila (1800 Silver).

The 1800 Tequila crest has 3 main elements: A Mayan Pyramid; a cross and the letters JB (the initials of the owner Juan Domingo Beckmann) and a ribbon with the words: work, passion, honesty (in Spanish trabajo, pasion, honestidad).

== Packaging ==
=== Bottle ===
1800's bottles have a trapezoidal shape, reminiscent of the Mayan pyramids. The bottle used to have a top designed to serve as a shot glass, by loosening the top slightly, turning the bottle upside down, and filling up the top.

=== Essential Artist Series ===
In 2008, 1800 Tequila released a limited-edition Essential Artist Series, with 12 unique bottle designs. A second series was released in 2009 with one "celebrity artist" bottle created by Shepard Fairey's firm Studio Number One, plus 11 new designs picked from 15,000 online submissions. The Essential Artist Series has ranged from 6 to 12 bottle collections - more recently they have all been 6 bottle collections.

== Tequilas ==
As of 2026, the tequilas under the 1800 brand are: 1800 Silver, 1800 Reposado, 1800 Añejo, 1800 Guachimonton, 1800 Cristalino, 1800 Milenio and 1800 Coconut. They also offer prepared cocktail margaritas.
