= Maestro Dobel Tequila =

Mexican brand of blended tequila

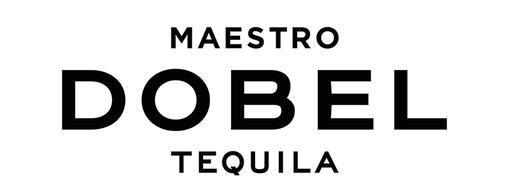
- Type: Tequila Silver, Cristalino, Reposado, Añejo + flavored tequilas
- Distributor: Proximo Spirits Inc
- Origin: Mexico
- Introduced: 2008
- Alcohol by volume: 40% abv
- Proof (US): 80
- Related products: List of tequilas
- Website: maestrodobel.com

Maestro Dobel Tequila is a Mexican brand of 100% agave tequilas owned by the Beckmann Family, who also own the Jose Cuervo tequila brand. Maestro Dobel is distributed by Proximo Spirits.

== History ==
Dobel was created by and named after Juan Domingo Beckmann Legorreta (Dobel being an acronym formed by the first syllables of Domingo Beckmann Legorreta). Beckmann is the eleventh-generation leader of Jose Cuervo tequilas, in collaboration with master distillers ("Maestros") Marco Anguiano and Luis Yerenas. It was introduced in 2008.

Dobel offers blanco, reposado, añejo and cristalino tequilas. Known for introducing the first-ever cristalino tequila, which is aged tequila that is then filtered to remove all color. The tequilas produced by Dobel are distilled from 100% blue agave from a single estate in Jalisco, Mexico.

The original bottle had a crystal cut glass design with a thick metallic base. The current bottle is modeled after a 19th-century laboratory bottle. Dobel’s packaging / bottle is shaped like a vintage apothecary-style bottle. The heavily-embossed bottle is like the laboratory sample bottles used by the distillery’s Maestro Tequileros. The signature of Maestro Tequilero and the founder of Dobel are on each bottle.

== Maestro Dobel Tequilas + production ==
All Dobel tequilas are 100% agave and double-distilled. In production, water extracted from naturally-occurring underground aquifers are used. The water originates from the volcano in Tequila, Jalisco. As of 2026, tequilas under the Maestro Dobel label include Dobel Blanco; Dobel Diamante Cristalino; Dobel Reposado; Dobel Añejo; Dobel Pavito; Dobel 50 Cristalino, Dobel 50 series of Extra Añejos and Dobel Atelier Tequilas. All Dobel tequilas are 40% Alcohol by Volume (ABV). In tequila production, blanco or silver tequilas are unaged; reposados are aged from weeks to less than 1 year; Añejos more than 1 year but less than 3 years; and Extra Añejos are aged over 3 years. Cristalino tequilas are aged tequilas that are then distilled to remove color while leaving the flavor of aged tequila. These tequila distinctions are all according to the regulatory body in Mexico the Consejo Regulador del Tequila.

== Honors and awards ==
In 2009, Bloomberg Businessweek named Dobel one of the world's 20 best tasting tequilas, stating that it "has the depth and character of the aged spirit without the color." Wine Enthusiast rated it a 93 in 2011, and it won gold medals at the 2011 and 2013 San Francisco World Spirits competitions, and a silver in 2010. In 2020, Bartender Spirits Awards named Dobel Añejo "Tequila Of The Year". In 2025, Dobel Blanco won the Concours Mondial de Bruxelles - Grand Gold Medal.

== Marketing and sports partnerships ==
Ad campaigns for the tequila feature musician Perry Farrell, and Dobel has been a sponsor at the Lollapalooza music festival in Chicago, Illinois.

Maestro Dobel Tequila is the Official Tequila of the US Open. The in-court promotion included a signature cocktail the Ace Paloma.

Maestro Dobel is also a partner of the PGA Golf Tour since 2021. The Official Tequila of the PGA Tour.
