= Peach Street Distillers =

Peach Street Distillers is a privately owned distillery in Palisade, Colorado, that produces Colorado Straight Bourbon Whiskey, the first legal bourbon in Colorado post-Prohibition. The distillery was established in November 2005 by Rory Donovan with Bill Graham and David Thibodeau, the co-founders of Ska Brewing Company in Durango, Colorado. In August 2025, Ska Brewing sold Peach Street Distillers to Whiskey Biz, LLC, a Palisade, Colorado-based company managed by Cody Butters Lewis and Michael Lewis. The Lewises also own and operate The Homestead, a boutique motel in Palisade, Colorado.

== History ==
Rory Donovan, Bill Graham and David Thibodeau were friends with past brewing and distilling experience who established the company in 2005. Peach Street Distillers holds Colorado's first post-prohibition distiller license, DSP CO 15001. In 2008, they produced the first legal bourbon in the state of Colorado. In 2010 it was one of 13 small-scale distilleries in the state. As of 2009, their products were sold in Colorado and as of 2011 their Goat Vodka and Jackelope Gin were also available in Oregon, California and Kansas.

Peach Street Distillers sources corn from Olathe, and pears, plums and peaches locally. They partnered with Debeque Canyon Winery to produce a grappa from Gewürztraminer and Viognier grapes. Peach Street Distillers has participated in the Colorado Distiller's Guild with other small licensed distilling companies to pool resources and cross-promote. For instance, Stranahan's Colorado Whiskey and Peach Street order their barrels together. They also worked with Sauvage Spectrum Winery & Estate Vineyard to produce Devil's Prey, a bourbon-barrel aged red blend.

== Awards ==
Peach Street Distillers has received awards and recognition for its spirits, including:

- Colorado Distillery of the Year (2012, 2013, 2014) - awarded by the New York International Spirits Competition
- Brandy Category (silver) (2013) - awarded by the American Distilling Institute
- Best American Vodka (2015) - awarded to Goat Vodka at the International Wine & Spirit Competition in London
- Brandy Category (silver), Straight Bourbon Category (bronze), Amaro Category (bronze) (2018) - awarded by the American Distilling Institute
- Brandy Category (bronze) (2019) - awarded by the American Distilling Institute
- Brandy Category (double gold) (2020) - awarded by the American Distilling Institute

== See also ==
- Whiskey
- Palisade, Colorado
- Cuisine of the Western United States
- Prohibition in the United States
- Sauvage Spectrum Winery & Estate Vineyard
- Stranahan's Colorado Whiskey
