= Kraken Rum =

Black rum

- Type: Spiced rum
- Manufacturer: Proximo Spirits
- Origin: The Caribbean
- Introduced: 2010
- Alcohol by volume: 47% Black-spiced & 35% Gold-spiced
- Proof (US): 94 proof Black-spiced rum: 70 proof Gold -spiced rum
- Color: Black and Gold-spiced rums
- Related products: List of rum brands
- Website: krakenrum.com

Kraken Black Spiced Rum is a Caribbean black spiced rum. The brand is owned and distributed by Proximo Spirits of Jersey City, New Jersey and named after the kraken, a mythical giant octopus like sea monster.

== Product description and packaging ==
Kraken Rum was introduced in 2010. The base rum at the time being from Trinidad, distilled from molasses made from sugar cane. The rum is aged 1–2 years and then blended with a mix of 11 spices, including cinnamon, ginger and clove. The liquid is black, revealing hints of brown when held up to the light.

The bottle is styled after a Victorian rum bottle, with two hoop handles based on the tradition of hanging a bottle to prevent breakages. The bottle has a black and white paper label featuring an illustration of a giant squid captioned with its scientific name, Architeuthis dux. The bottle's back label states that it is "imported rum from the Caribbean blended with natural flavors."

Beginning in 2015, Proximo began selling Kraken Ghost White Rum exclusively in Mexico.

In early 2020, Kraken released two new pre-mixed flavours, Kraken & Dry and Kraken & Cola, increasing its hold on the Australian market. Kraken's Ceramic Flagons were produced by UK based Pottery firm Wade Ceramics, though ceased contractual agreements in 2020.

In March 2023, The Kraken brand launched Kraken Gold-Spiced Rum. Over the years, different black-spiced rum varieties have been launched. There was also a launch of Kraken cocktails in cans, which included Kraken and Cola, Kraken and Ginger and also Kraken Rum Punch (2022).

As of 2026, the product list for the brand is:

Name	ABV	Proof	Details
Kraken Black-Spiced Rum	47%	94	Made with 13 secret spices. Flavor: Vanilla, ginger and peppercorn notes with a lingering spicy finish
Kraken Gold-Spiced Rum	35%	70	Dominican rum aged for two years. Flavor: Molasses and dark spice, caramelized sugar. Toasted oak and vanilla finish.

== Marketing ==
In 2013, two outdoor 3D billboards went up in Chicago, with a kraken sea creature's giant tentacle pulling a consumer out of an apartment window in an advertisement for Kraken Rum. The ad was created by New York agency Dead As We Know It, which also produced several animated TV spots for the brand, combining 2D and 3D animations in a 19th-century scientific style, as well as an iPhone and Android app, The Kraken: The Simulation Application for Nautical Maneuvering, a game in which players steer a ship through kraken-infested waters. Later that year, Blur Studio created animated spots featuring a kraken destroying a ship to the tune of Bobby Darin's 1959 version of the song "Beyond the Sea".

The World's End pub in Brighton, England features a Kraken Rum mural.

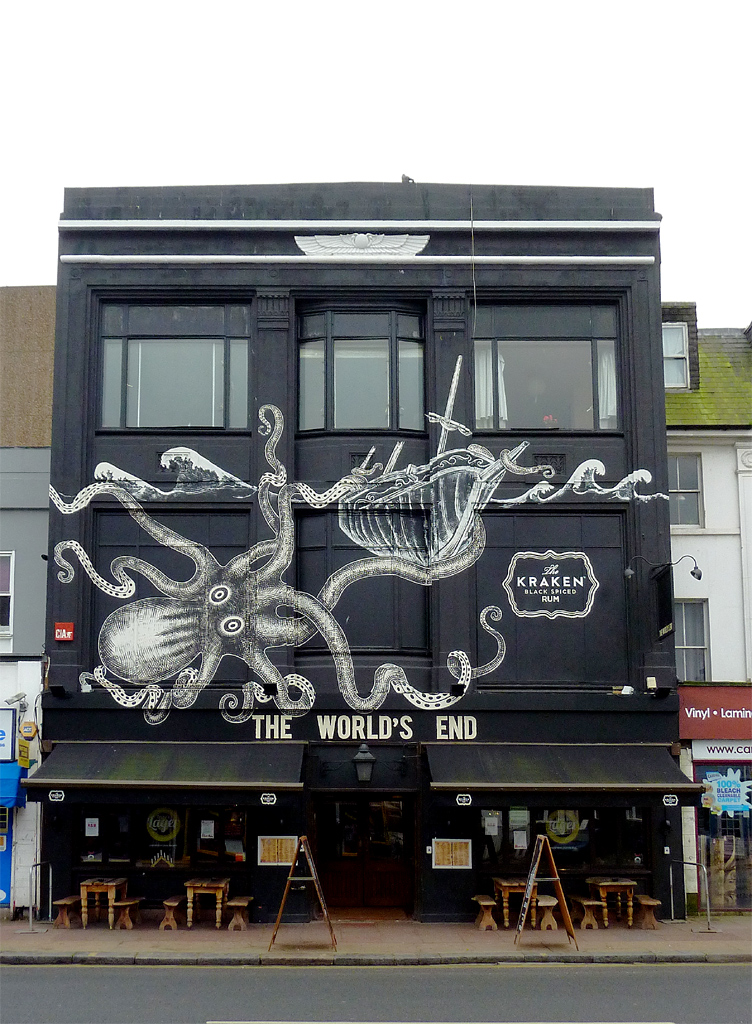
The Kraken Rum mural on the World's End pub in Brighton.

Kraken Rum was the sponsor of the Kitschies, a British speculative fiction award.

In October 2020 Kraken collaborated with competitive freediver Beci Ryan, because the drinks company announced that it was opening its first underwater 'Dive Thru'. Ryan was tasked to freedive to a treasure chest containing bottles of the new limited edition spiced rum and salvage them. Customers had the opportunity of winning one of these retrieved bottles. In addition Kraken confirmed they would be making a donation of £1 from the sale of every bottle of this rum to PADI Aware.

Shortly after announcing their team name, the Seattle Kraken ice hockey team announced Kraken Rum as their official rum sponsor.

The Kraken Rums are marketed with a "Legend" of a sea creature that attacks ships with Caribbean Rum barrels inside. According to this legend, the black color is due to "squid ink". This brand profile also has a club called "The League of Darkness".

== Medals ==
Kraken has been named an Impact "Hot Brand" by Impact magazine.

Competition	Year	Medal	Product that Won
ASCoT Awards	2024	Double Platinum won	Kraken Black Spiced Rum 94 proof
Los Angeles Invitational Wine & Spirits Competition	2024	Best Rum	Kraken Black Spiced Rum 94 proof
Denver International Spirits Competition	2024	Gold won	Kraken Black Spiced Rum 94 proof
ASCoT Awards	2024	Gold won	Kraken Gold Spiced Rum
Los Angeles Invitational Wine & Spirits Competition	2024	Double Gold won	Kraken Gold Spiced Rum
Denver International Spirits Competition	2024	Gold won	Kraken Black Spiced 70 Proof Rum
