= White-collar boxing =

Participation of white collar workers in boxing

White-collar boxing is a form of boxing in which people in white-collar professions train to fight at special events. Most have had no prior boxing experience.

== Early history ==
White-collar boxing has its beginnings at Gleason's Gym in New York City. Gym owner Bruce Silverglade began organizing informal fights between the white-collar workers of his clientele in the late 1980s, which later developed into regular monthly events. After developing into a regular monthly event, the sport came to prominence in the mid-1990s under the organization of boxing promoter Alan Lacey. Alan, along with business partners, went on to promote white-collar boxing in the United Kingdom. Other shows like Celebrity Fight Night went on to thrive in the UK. By 2004, over 65% of Gleason's Gym membership was from a white-collar background, compared to 10% in the early 1990s. The increase of membership from this demographic has been credited with maintaining the profitability of boxing gyms in the US and UK with large shows like WCB & Ultra White Collar.

Event management consultant Alan Lacey, who co-promoted the Gary Stretch vs. Chris Eubank WBO middleweight championship bout in 1991, belatedly discovered boxing training at the age of 45. Captivated and motivated by the discipline over the following years, he started training under former European champion Jimmy McDonnell and alongside two-time Olympian and world title challenger Adrian Dodson, who having spent most of his youth at Gleason’s Gym in New York suggested Lacey fulfill his ambition to box, even at the age of 48, and arranged for him to visit Gleason's and box there. On the flight back to London, Lacey decided white-collar boxing could flourish in London.

In July 2000, one of the first notable white-collar boxing events, "Capital Punishment", in collaboration with Gleason's owner Bruce Silverglade, saw a team of Wall Street bankers fly to London to compete at Broadgate Arena in London, generating interest and media coverage. Lacey boxed twice on the night and subsequently devoted his time and energy to developing the sport exclusively since. Over 100 sold-out events have followed "Capital Punishment", including "Celebrity Boxing" on the BBC in 2003 featuring, among others, Les Dennis and Ricky Gervais, and raising more than £1.5 million for various charities. Lacey worked closely with various clubs to promote WCB forming the first White Collar Boxing shows in the UK.

== In the Asia–Pacific region ==
The many bouts in the Asia–Pacific region are usually contested under WWCBA (see below) sanctioning.

== Governing bodies ==
In 2001, Lacey and Bruce Silverglade co-founded the International White Collar Boxing Association (IWCBA), the first and to this day main advisory and sanctioning governing body in the field, designed to regulate the bouts with a focus on safety. The IWCBA uses the same weight divisions of professional boxing and awards a belt to the champions of each weight category. Matchmaking of non-title bouts is based on level of experience as much as actual weight. It also rigorously requires the presence of an experienced doctor, an anesthetist, and a paramedic unit at ringside as well as thorough medical checks. Over 1,500 bouts have been sanctioned by the IWCBA over the years, with zero injuries aside from bloody noses. IWBCA-sanctioned bouts are predominant in the UK and US.

In 2007, the World White Collar Boxing Association (WWCBA) was founded in London, UK, to regulate and promote the sport throughout the world, but is principally active in the Asia–Pacific region. The WWCBA provides a common platform in the form of rules and guidelines allowing boxers to become ranked nationally, regionally and globally and to contest for championship titles. In 2008 the WWCBA sanctioned 9 events throughout the world. The WWCBA works with other boxing authorities such as the amateur International Boxing Association (AIBA) to ensure strong standards.

== Bouts ==
Bouts are usually three 2-minute rounds ("3×2" format), unlike the longer three 3-minute rounds (3×3) in the Amateur Code for men and 4×2 format for women. The IWCBA bouts have traditionally been "no decision" draws (ties) in absence of a knock-out, while WWCBA ranking system requires a win–loss decision for all bouts.

The first large gala events included the Boodles Boxing Ball series attended by Prince Harry as well as the "Hedge Fund Fight Nite" raising over $200,000 for charity both is initially organized/staged by The Real Fight Club.

In 2005 a purely non-profit black-tie gala at the London Hilton organized by The David Adams Leukaemia Appeal Fund & Mr King with more than 950 black-tie dinner guests raised over £100,000 for The Royal Marsden Hospital Cancer Campaign on the night. It was the largest event of its kind until 2013, see below.

In April 2009 a gala at Suntec Singapore Exhibition and Convention Centre staged by Vanda Promotions had more than 900 black-tie guests.

On Saturday, 18 July 2009, the Channel Island of Jersey held its first white-collar-boxing event. Nine fights were watched by over 600 paying, black-tied guests at the Hotel de France, raising around £15,000 for local charities.

In 2009, Ultra White Collar Boxing (UWCB) hosted their first event in Derby and soon became the largest company organising events in the UK. They hold events in over 110 towns and cities across the UK and have raised over £40,000,000 to date through Ultra Events for charities across the UK since they began fundraising in 2013. UWCB organise over 450 events a year with an average of 15,000 people taking part each year. In their 10 year history more than 350,000 people have taken part in UWCB events organised across the UK.

One of the newest names in the industry is Premier White Collar Boxing (PWCB). Hosting sold-out shows at venues, PWCB gives the boxers the opportunity to raise money for a charity of their choice.

In 2010, the WCB events were formed by Bromley Fight Night which created the “Bromley Fight Night series, and in 2016 they hosted the celebrity fight night at the Clapham grand with several celebrities competing and drawing the attention of ok magazine, hello magazine and the sun newspaper. Bromley Fight Night is still running in 2024 at the Broadway Theatre Catford.

Bromley Fight Night had verified attendance of 1000 at the Great Hall in Bromley and televised on sky by MA action. 2BX Gym in Bromley have provided the training for free for Bromley Fight Night who have held shows across the Borough and now hold a 800 seated event Broadway theatre. Professional boxers started out on this show and house hold names in Bromley like Sonny Dormer, Dale Gilmore and Billy The Kid first competed on BFN.

On 13 October 2012, Neilson Boxing, a Swindon-based white-collar-boxing promoter, put on the largest show of its kind to date. A venue verified attendance of 1398 watched ten contests at the Oasis Leisure Centre in Swindon with the main event seeing Dave 'Bam Bam' Gregory retain his NP Heavyweight title against Rich 'The Tank' Loveday over three rounds. This was surpassed in March 2014 when a crowd of nearly 2,000 fight fans saw 'Sugar' Shawn Grant defeat ex-pro Phill Day to gain the Vacant Cruiserweight Title.

On 20 April 2013, Vanda Promotions (part of Vanda Sports Group) held its twenty-fourth event in Singapore making the series the longest consecutive white-collar boxing in the history of the sport. A verified attendance of 1,943 attended the black-tie event at the Raffles Convention Centre which brought total attendance over the five-year history of the events to 15,491. The event also saw Vanda move past the $2 million mark for funds raised for children's charities in Asia and for the continued funding of the Vanda Wing at Children's Surgical Centre in Cambodia. Vanda was also the recipient of the "Promoter of the year award" for the fourth consecutive year from the World White Collar Boxing Association (WWCBA).

=== YouTube boxing ===
On 3 February 2018, two British YouTubers, KSI and Joe Weller, fought at Copper Box Arena in London, England, where KSI defeated Weller by technical knockout. On YouTube, the KSI vs. Weller fight drew 21 million views on fight night, and over 25 million over the next several days, becoming the biggest white-collar boxing fight in history.

KSI fought American YouTube personality Logan Paul in a white-collar boxing match on 25 August 2018. One judge scored in favour of KSI and two judges scored a draw, resulting in a majority draw. The fight has been labeled "the largest event in YouTube history" and "the largest ever amateur boxing fight".

== Equipment ==
Sixteen-ounce gloves are standard in the white-collar-boxing ring in order to protect competitors from heavy blows and hand injuries. Some gyms permit 14 oz gloves as well for lighter weight classes and for female competitors. Moreover, headgear, groin protectors, and mouthguards are obligatory requirements inside the ring.
