= Señor Río =

Mexican brand of tequila

- Type: Premium tequila
- Manufacturer: Jalisco International Imports
- Country of origin: Mexico
- Introduced: 2009
- Proof (US): 80
- Variants: Añejo, Reposado, Blanco
- Website: Señor Rio

Señor Río is an ultra-premium brand of tequila produced in Tequila, Jalisco, Mexico and imported by Jalisco International Imports.

Made from 100% Blue Weber Agaves, harvested in the Jalisco lowlands, Señor Río comes in three varieties: Blanco, "Reposado", and Añejo.

== History ==
Jalisco International Imports, based in Queen Creek, Arizona, was formed in 2009 by Jonathan Gach and Debbie Medina.

== Awards ==
Senor Rio's Blanco - Bronze Medal, 2009 Spirits of Mexico Competition.
Senor Rio's Anejo - Bronze Medal, 2010 The San Francisco World Spirits Competition.
