= Boodles (company) =

British luxury jeweler and jewelry designer

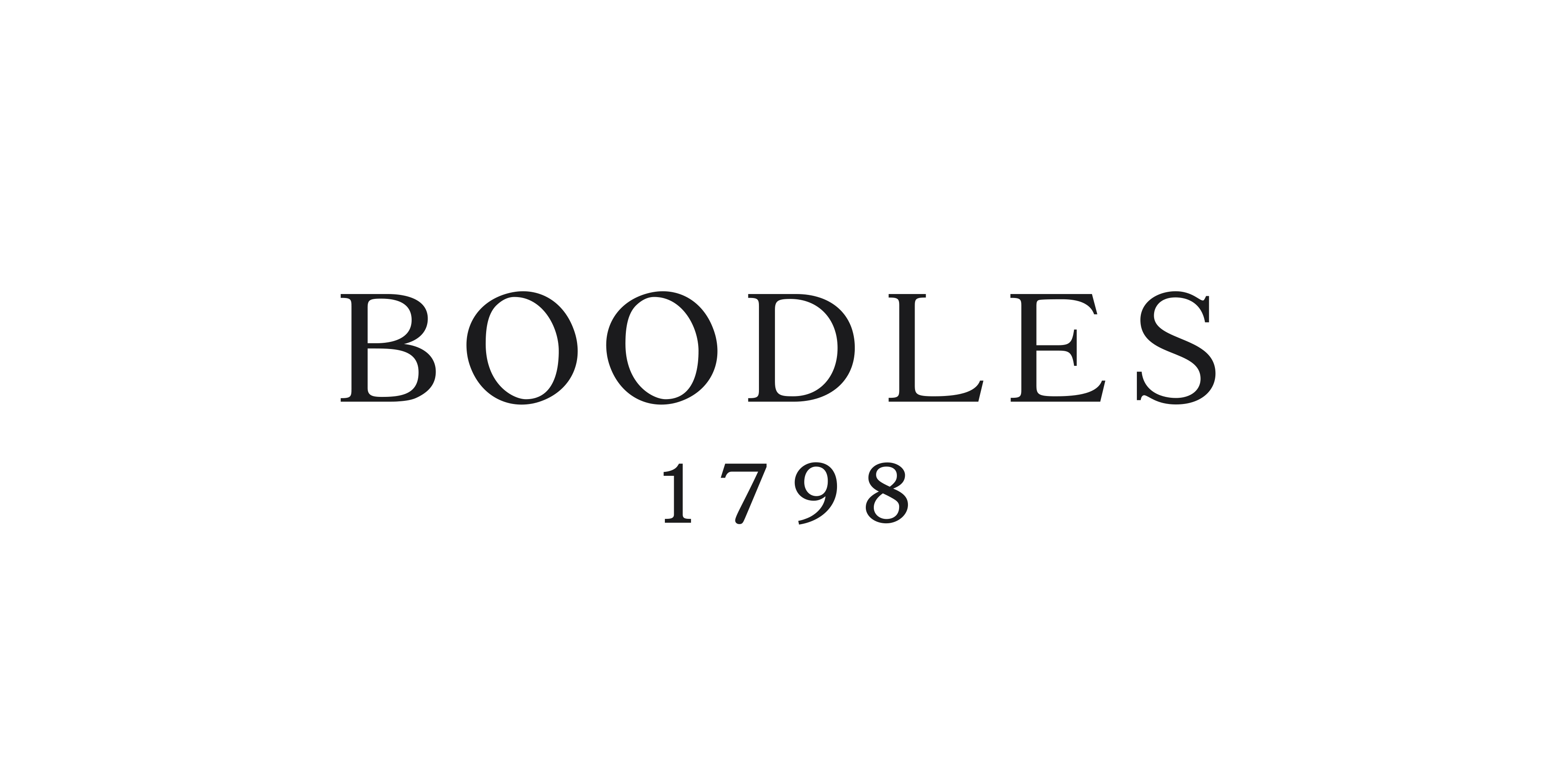
- Type: Private
- Industry: Luxury goods, Jewellery
- Founded: 1798
- Headquarters: Boodles House, Lord Street, Liverpool, England
- Key people: Nicholas Wainwright (President); Michael Wainwright (Chairman); James Amos (Joint Managing Director); Jody Wainwright (Joint Managing Director)
- Products: Jewellery
- Website: www.boodles.com

Boodles is a privately held British luxury jeweller and jewellery designer group founded in 1798. Boodles is a family company with headquarters in Liverpool. Its flagship store is at 23 Old Bond Street, London, and it has stores in London, Manchester, Dublin, Leeds and Chester.

== History ==
=== Early history ===
The company Kirk & Co. was originally founded in 1798 in Hull. In 1878, Henry Wainright began as an apprentice in making watches and jewelry under his uncle, William Wainright. In 1889, Henry Wainright began managing Kirk & Co.'s new location in Liverpool. He later bought the company and renamed it H. Wainright & Sons when his sons, Herbert and Harold, joined the business in 1898.

In 1910 the two sons established their own business with the purchase of Boodle and Dunthorne. After Harold was killed in WWI, Henry and Herbert chose to merge H. Wainwright & Sons with Boodle and Dunthorne. They relocated the business to the corner of Lord Street and North John Street in Liverpool, which remains Boodles head office today.

In 1965 Boodles opened a second store, in Chester, and a third, in Manchester in 1982. In the 1990s, Nicholas and Michael Wainwright took over from their father, Anthony Wainwright. Boodles opened several stores in London.

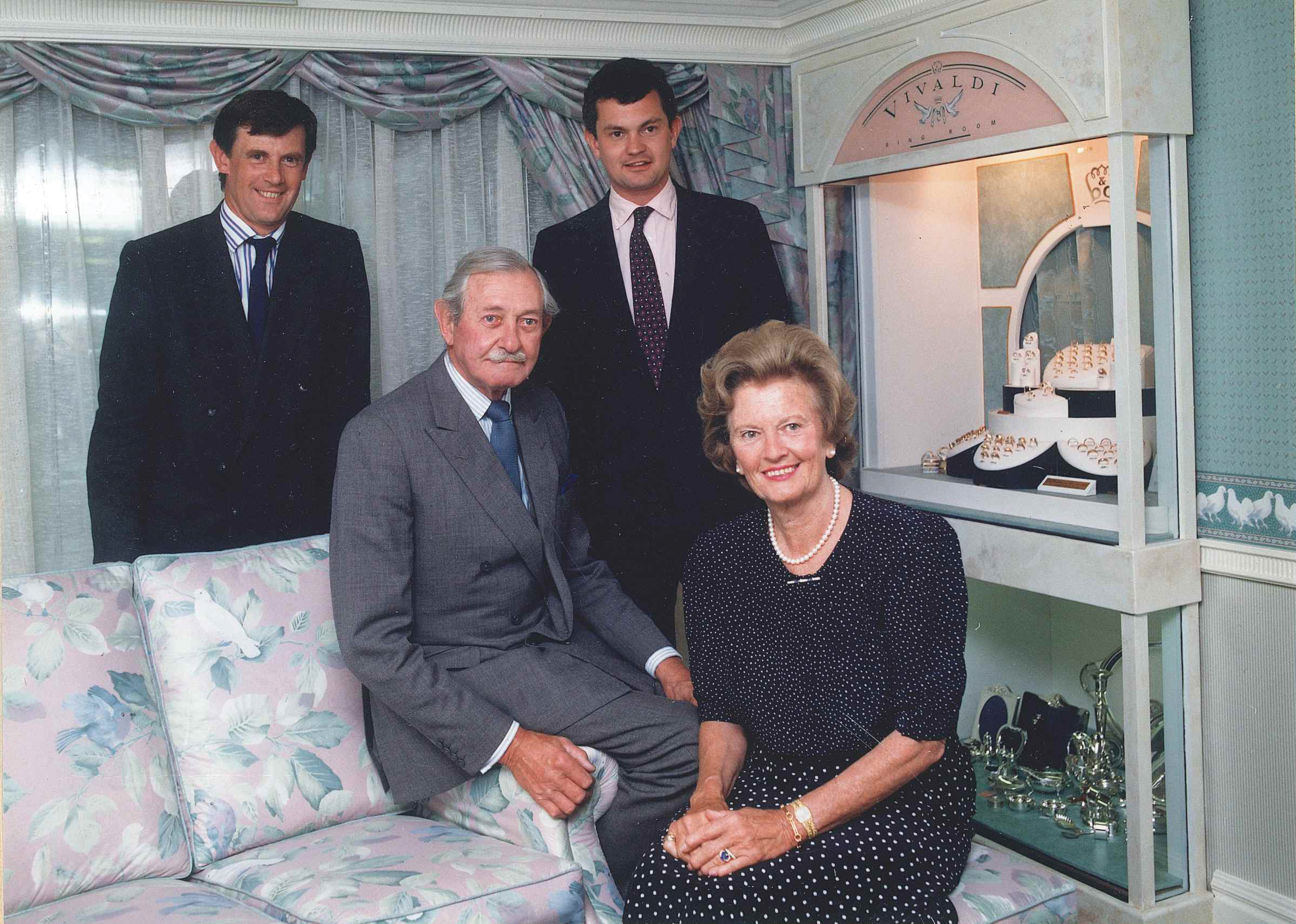
1980s Family Shot Boodles

=== 2000s: Opening in London ===
In 2005, the company rebranded from Boodle & Dunthorne to Boodles. In 2007, the store relocated to Bond Street, becoming the flagship showroom and solidifying Boodles’ position in British luxury jewellery. The brand later expanded, with boutiques in Harrods, the Savoy Hotel, the Royal Exchange and Sloane Street.

=== 2010s: Rebranding ===
In 2012, Boodles launched its e-commerce platform, allowing the company to reach a global audience online. In 2014, Channel 4 aired The Million Pound Necklace, a documentary showcasing Boodles' creation of the Greenfire Suite, a jewellery collection made of emeralds valued at £2.8 million.

In 2015, Boodles collaborated with the Royal Ballet to create the Pas de Deux collection, which featured jewelry inspired by ballet. Boodles launched its new showroom at No.6 Sloane Street in early 2017. In 2018, Boodles partnered with Patek Philippe to produce a special World Time wristwatch with Liverpool positioned at the 12 o'clock spot.

=== 2020s ===
In 2020, Boodles launched The Secret Garden Collection, inspired by the film adaptation of the classic novel, with a portion of proceeds supporting the NSPCC. In 2021, Boodles introduced the Peace of Mined Collection, focusing on diamonds from the Cullinan Mine. In 2022, Boodles launched the Around the World in 16 Days Collection, inspired by Anthony Wainwright’s 1962 globe-trotting journey. In 2022, Boodles won a Gold Medal at the RHS Chelsea Flower Show for the Boodles Travel Garden, inspired by Anthony Wainwright’s travels.

In October of 2022, The history of Boodles was the subject of an exhibition at the Lady Lever Art Gallery in Port Sunlight. On display were jewellery and objects relating to the company, including Grand National trophies.

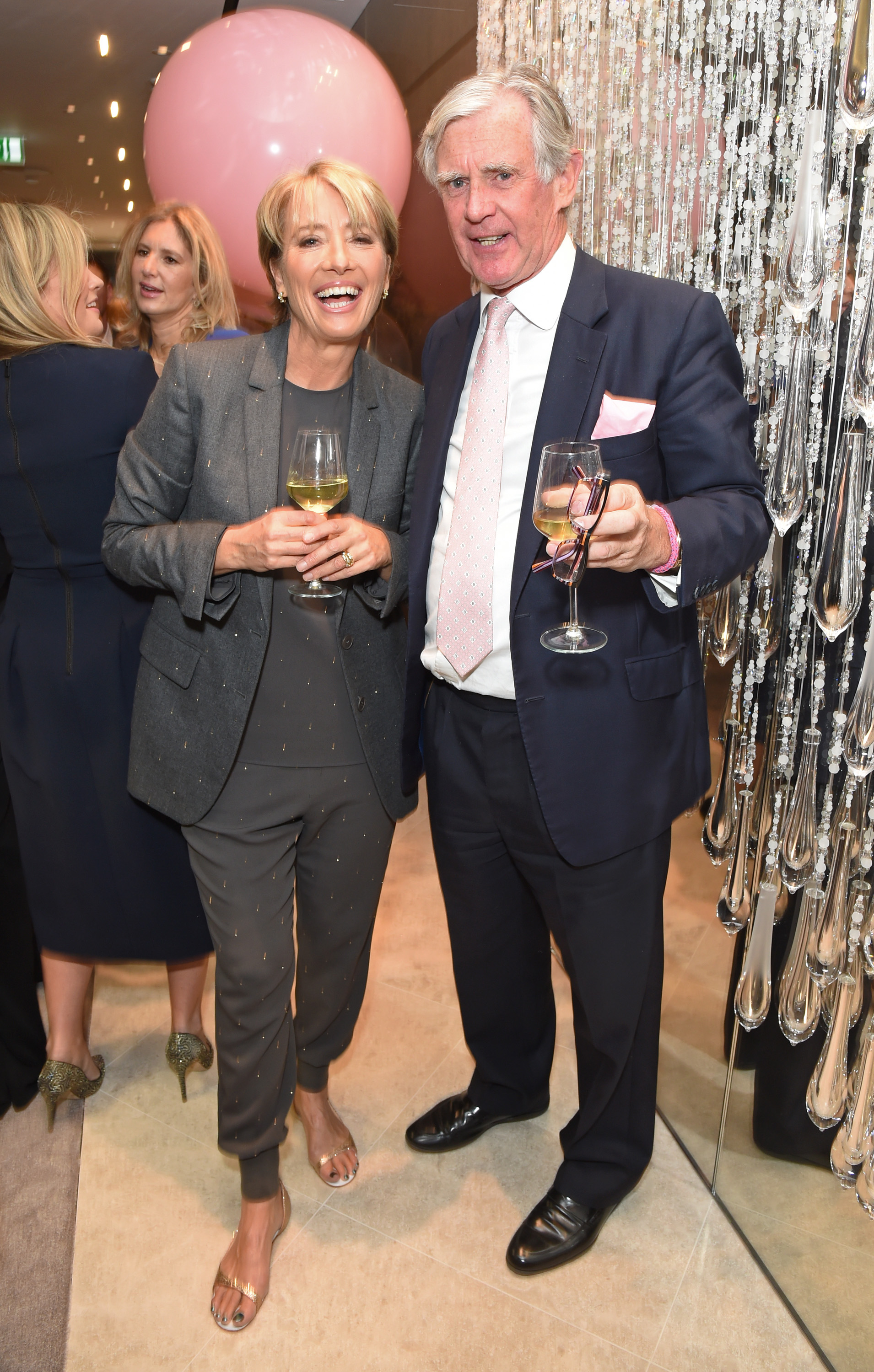
Famous Boodles client, Emma Thompson, at the Bond Street flagship store launch party in 2015.

In 2024, Boodles created The National Gallery Collection for the National Gallery’s 200th anniversary, also sponsoring a garden at the Chelsea Flower Show called NG200, inspired by gallery paintings. In November, sponsored the Hay Wain Constable Exhibition, and designed a line of brooches inspired by Constable's works. In 2024, Boodles worked with Bentley to create a unique ‘one-of-one’ Boodles Bentley, which was unveiled at the Jack Barclay showroom.

Boodles has ten stores including five in London: Savoy Hotel, Old Bond Street, Sloane Street, The Royal Exchange, Brompton Road and Harrods, three in North West England; (Liverpool, Chester and Manchester), one in Leeds, West Yorkshire and one in Dublin, Ireland.

On 28 September 2026, Boodles opened its new flagship store, the Boodles Townhouse, at 23 Old Bond Street in London. Designed by GPstudios, the premises cover 13,170 sq ft (1,224 m^{2}) across seven floors and include a courtyard garden by landscape designer Catherine Macdonald. Two archive rooms document the company's history and jewellery design, with displays developed with assistance from National Museums Liverpool. The archive includes jewellery, silverware, historical documents and designs for Grand National trophies.

== Products ==
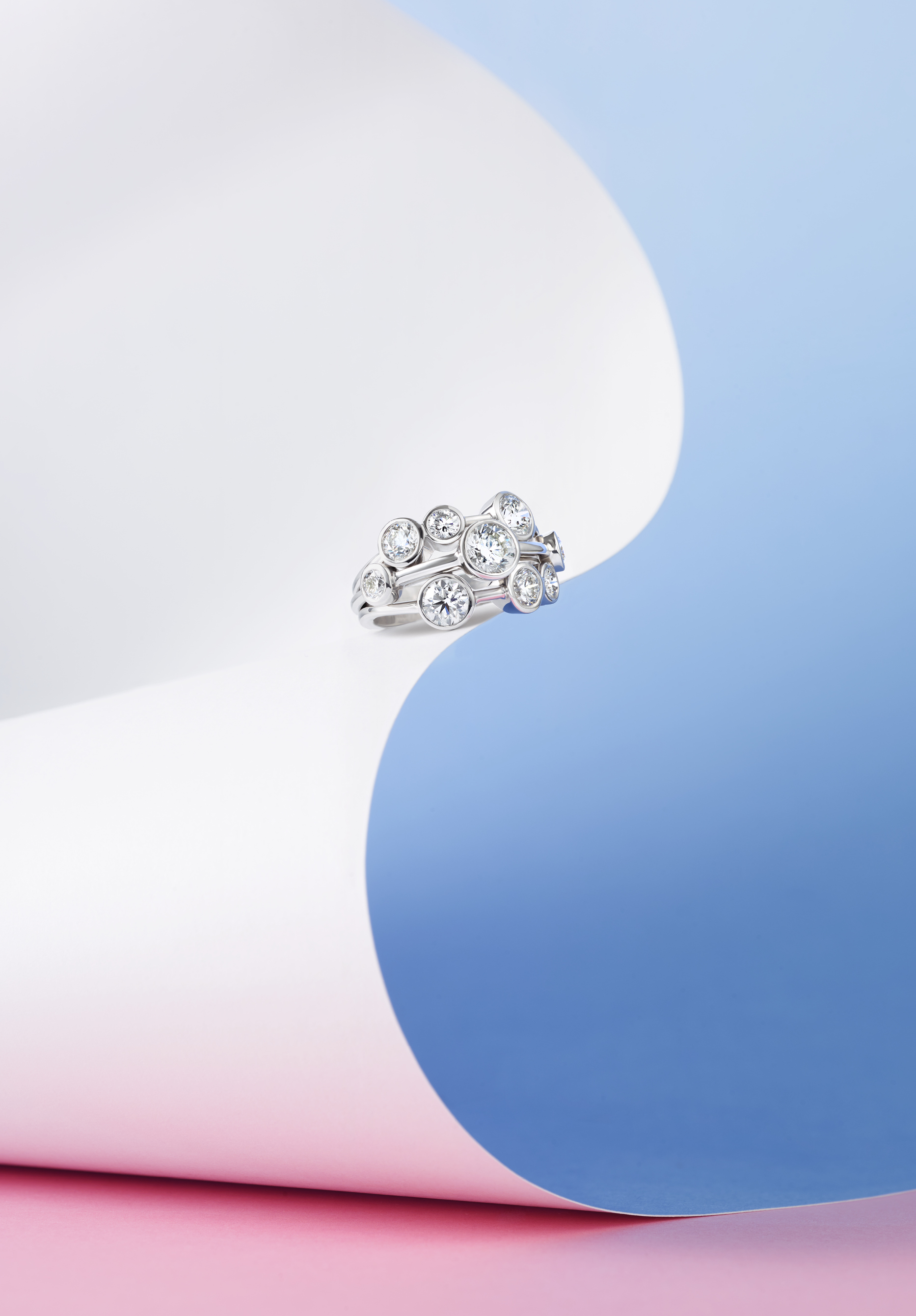
The Boodles Raindance Ring, selected in 2008 to appear in the Victoria and Albert Museum's permanent jewellery collection.

In its early years, Boodles was a silversmith, watchmaker, and jeweler. During the 20th century the company provided chronographs and watches to air and naval officers. It also designed and crafted cups for sporting and non-sporting competitions including the solid gold trophy for the winner of the Grand National.

In the second half of the 20th century, Boodles emerged as a retailer of bespoke jewellery. The company sources diamonds and other gemstones, and designs its own range of jewellery. Boodles is the exclusive UK retailer of Ashoka diamonds developed by William Goldberg in New York.

== Honours ==
In 2009, the Boodles Raindance Ring was selected for the Victoria and Albert Museum's permanent jewellery collection.

In 2023, Boodles was awarded the Walpole British Luxury Brand of the Year.

== Sponsorship ==
The Boodles Boxing Ball is a biennial charity event held at the Grosvenor Park Hotel on Park Lane in London, and at the Old Billingsgate Market since 2025, with all proceeds going to charities such as the Starlight Children's Foundation.

From 2022 to 2023, Pure Brilliance: The Boodles Story exhibition was held at the Lady Lever Art Gallery.

Between 2023 and 2024, Boodles sponsored the Discover Constable & The Hay Wain exhibition at the National Gallery. and designed a line of brooches inspired by Constable's works.

The company hosts Boodles Tennis at Stoke Park and is the title sponsor of The Cheltenham Gold Cup. In 2022, the company was a key supporter of the RHS Chelsea Flower Show, winning a Gold Medal for The Boodles Travel Garden, inspired by Anthony Wainwright’s travels. Boodles sponsors Chester Races, Burghley Horse Trials, and Salon Privé.
