= Corsair Artisan Distillery =

American distilling company

Coordinates: 36.9941°N 86.4410°W

- Industry: distillery
- Founded: January 1, 2008; 17 years ago in Bowling Green, Kentucky
- Founder: Derek Bell; Andrew Webber
- Headquarters: Nashville, TN
- Website: https://www.corsairdistillery.com

Corsair Artisan Distillery is a small-batch distilling company that operates in Nashville, Tennessee, US. It was originally founded in Bowling Green, Kentucky, in January 2008. The distillery is owned and operated by Derek Bell and Andrew Webber, who are both distillers and natives of Nashville. Corsair Artisan Distillery is known for its production of innovative spirits, which include buckwheat whiskey, quinoa whiskey, malted and smoked whiskies, multi-grain bourbons, barrel-aged gin, red absinthe, naturally flavored vodka, and spiced rum.

== History ==
Childhood friends Webber and Bell began their journey into homebrewing beer and wine in Bell's garage. They initially encountered challenges while working on a biodiesel plant prototype, which led Webber to propose focusing on whiskey production instead. The distillery officially commenced operations in Bowling Green, Kentucky, in 2008. Due to their strong connection to Tennessee, the owners established a second location in Nashville in 2010, making Corsair the first legal craft distillery in Nashville since Prohibition. Embracing the ethos of "Innovate or Die," Corsair has ventured into creating numerous experimental products, incorporating unconventional grains such as quinoa, spelt, triticale, and buckwheat, along with various hop variations. Notably, their quinoa whiskey gained recognition and was featured on the 393rd episode of the cooking show, Chopped.

Corsair expanded further by opening a third location in the Wedgewood/Houston neighborhood of Nashville in 2016. This move allowed them to increase production capacity and utilize the WeHo site for additional office space and barrel storage, effectively designating it as their headquarters. The Bowling Green distillery was subsequently closed on August 31, 2018, as Corsair focused on expanding its two Nashville locations and achieving national distribution.

In March 2020, Corsair undertook a rebranding initiative to facilitate wider distribution and streamline its product line, resulting in changes to spirit names and proofs. Additionally, during the COVID-19 pandemic, the distillery garnered attention for producing hand sanitizer, which was donated to healthcare facilities in substantial quantities.

Corsair is committed to encapsulating the essence of Nashville by utilizing resources from Bell's local farm, including their own malthouse and smokehouse. They offer tours at their Nashville locations to showcase their craft spirits and local craft beers.

== List of spirits ==
As of 2018, Corsair had manufactured a total of 28 distinct types of spirits. Presently, the availability of these spirits may vary, with 11 typically offered for sale. Additionally, there are six varieties classified as seasonal or experimental, while 11 have been discontinued.

Corsair Spirit Lineup
Artisan Gin	Current
Red Absinthe	Current
Vanilla Bean Vodka	Current
Spiced Rum	Current
Triple Smoke Malt Whiskey	Current
Quinoa Whiskey	Discontinued
Ryemageddon/Dark Rye	Current
Oatrage Oat Whiskey	Discontinued
Barrel Aged Gin	Current
Wildfire Malt Whiskey	Current
Genever	Discontinued
Buck Yeah Buckwheat Whiskey	Discontinued
Citra Double IPA	Current
Nashville Bourbon	Discontinued
Pumpkin Spice Moonshine	Current
Grainiac Bourbon	Discontinued
Green Malt Whiskey	Discontinued
Wry Moon	Discontinued
100% Rye	Discontinued
Steampunk	Discontinued
Cherrywood Smoked	Discontinued
Elderflower Bohemian	Discontinued
Hopmonster	Discontinued
Insane in the Grain	Discontinued
Oat Smoked Wheat Whiskey	Discontinued
Oatmeal Stout	Discontinued
Triticale Whiskey	Discontinued
Galaxy	Discontinued

== Awards ==
In 2018, the company reported that its spirits had received over 800 medals at national and international spirits competitions.

All-Around Awards
2017 Berlin International Spirits Competition	American Whiskey Distillery of the Year
2017 Wizards of Whisky	World Distiller of the Year
2017 Wizards of Whisky	U.S. Craft Distiller of the Year
2014 Wizards of Whisky	World Other Grain Whisky of the Year
2014 Wizards of Whisky	Regional Winner: U.S. Craft Distillers
2014 Wizards of Whisky	American Craft Distiller of the Year
2014 Icons of Whisky: America	Whisky Brand Innovator of the Year
2014 American Distilling Institute Awards	Craft Distillery of the Year (Bubble Cap Award)
2013 Icons of Whisky: America	Craft Distiller of the Year
2013 Icons of Whisky: America	Whisky Brand Innovator of the Year
2012 New York International Spirits Competition	Tennessee Distillery of the Year

Individual Awards
Triple Smoke	2017 American Craft Spirits Awards	Gold Medal
Triple Smoke	2017 Berlin International Spirits Competition	Bronze Medal
Triple Smoke	2017 New York International Spirits Competition	Gold Medal
Triple Smoke	2017 Whisky Advocate Awards	Artisan Whiskey of the Year
Triple Smoke	2017 American Distilling Institute Awards	Silver Medal
Triple Smoke	2016 American Craft Spirits Awards	Gold Medal
Triple Smoke	2014 American Craft Spirits Awards	Silver Medal
Triple Smoke	2014 San Francisco World Spirits Competition	Double Gold
Triple Smoke	2014 International Review of Spirits Awards	Gold Medal
Triple Smoke	2014 American Distilling Institute Awards	Best of Category, Bronze
Triple Smoke	2012 American Distilling Institute Awards	Bronze Medal
Triple Smoke	2011 MicroLiquor Spirits Awards	Gold Medal
Triple Smoke	2011 American Distilling Institute Awards	Bronze Medal
Triple Smoke	2010 International Review of Spirits Awards, BTI	Gold Medal
Triple Smoke	2010 American Distilling Institute Awards	Silver Medal
Triple Smoke	2010 San Francisco World Spirits Competition	Gold Medal
Nashville (discontinued)	2017 American Craft Spirits Awards	Gold Medal
Nashville (discontinued)	2017 American Distilling Institute Awards	Silver Medal
Nashville (discontinued)	2014 American Distilling Institute Awards	Silver Medal
Nashville (discontinued)	2012 American Distilling Institute Awards	Silver Medal
Gin	2017 American Craft Spirits Awards	Bronze Medal
Gin	2013 The Fifty Best	Gold Medal
Gin	2011 International Review of Spirits Awards, BTI	Gold Medal
Gin	2011 MicroLiquor Spirits Awards	Silver Medal
Gin	2009 World Beverage Competition	Gold Medal
Gin	2009 San Francisco World Spirits Competition	Gold Medal
Barrel Aged Gin	2018 American Distilling Institute Awards	Bronze Medal
Barrel Aged Gin	2016 American Craft Spirits Awards	Bronze Medal
Barrel Aged Gin	2016 American Distilling Institute Awards	Silver Medal
Barrel Aged Gin	2014 San Francisco World Spirits Competition	Silver Medal
Barrel Aged Gin	2013 The Fifty Best	Double Gold
Barrel Aged Gin	2013 American Distilling Institute Awards	Best of Category, Gold
Barrel Aged Gin	2012 NY International Spirits Competition	Silver Medal
Barrel Aged Gin	2011 San Francisco World Spirits Competition	Gold Medal
Genever (discontinued)	2017 American Craft Spirits Awards	Bronze Medal
Genever (discontinued)	2017 American Distilling Institute Awards	Bronze Medal
Genever (discontinued)	2016 American Craft Spirits Awards	Silver Medal
Genever (discontinued)	2015 American Distilling Institute Awards	Best of Category, Gold
Genever (discontinued)	2014 San Francisco World Spirits Competition	Double Gold
Genever (discontinued)	2014 American Craft Distiller's Awards	Gold Medal
Genever (discontinued)	2013 American Distilling Institute Awards	Bronze Medal
Green Malt (discontinued)	2017 American Craft Spirits Awards	Bronze Medal
Green Malt (discontinued)	2017 American Distilling Institute Awards	Silver Medal
Buck Yeah (discontinued)	2017 American Craft Spirits Awards	Bronze Medal
Buck Yeah (discontinued)	2017 American Distilling Institute Awards	Best of Category, Silver
Buck Yeah (discontinued)	2015 American Craft Spirits Awards	Silver Medal
Buck Yeah (discontinued)	2015 American Distilling Institute Awards	Best of Category, Silver
Ryemageddon	2018 American Distilling Institute Awards	Silver Medal
Ryemageddon	2017 American Craft Spirits Awards	Bronze Medal
Ryemageddon	2017 Berlin International Spirits Competition	Silver Medal
Ryemageddon	2017 American Distilling Institute Awards	Silver Medal
Ryemageddon	2016 American Distilling Institute Awards	Best of Category, Gold
Ryemageddon	2015 American Craft Spirits Awards	Gold Medal
Ryemageddon	2014 American Craft Spirits Awards	Silver Medal
Ryemageddon	2014 International Review of Spirits Awards	Gold Medal
Ryemageddon	2014 San Francisco World Spirits Competition	Gold Medal
Ryemageddon	2013 International Review of Spirits Award	Gold Medal
Ryemageddon	2012 American Distilling Institute Awards	Silver Medal
Citra Double IPA	2017 American Craft Spirits Awards	Bronze Medal
Citra Double IPA	2012 American Distilling Institute Awards	Best of Category, Gold
Wildfire (discontinued)	2018 American Distilling Institute Awards	Silver Medal
Wildfire (discontinued)	2017 Berlin International Spirits Competition	Gold Medal
Wildfire (discontinued)	2017 New York International Spirits Competition	Silver Medal
Wildfire (discontinued)	2017 American Distilling Institute Awards	Silver Medal
Wildfire (discontinued)	2016 American Craft Spirits Awards	Silver Medal
Red Absinthe	2017 American Craft Spirits Awards	Silver Medal
Red Absinthe	2014 American Distilling Institute Awards	Bronze Medal
Oatrage (discontinued)	2017 Berlin International Spirits Competition	Gold Medal
Oatrage (discontinued)	2015 American Distilling Institute Awards	Bronze Medal
Quinoa Whiskey (discontinued)	2013 International Review of Spirits Award	Gold Medal
Quinoa Whiskey (discontinued)	2012 American Distilling Institute Awards	Bronze Medal
Quinoa Whiskey (discontinued)	2011 New York International Spirits Competition	Silver Medal
Grainiac (discontinued)	2017 American Distilling Institute Awards	Bronze Medal
Grainiac (discontinued)	2012 American Distillers Institute Awards	Best of Class, Best of Category, Gold
Pumpkin Spice Moonshine	2014 American Distilling Institute Awards	Bronze Medal
Pumpkin Spice Moonshine	2011 MicroLiquor Spirits Awards	Bronze Medal
Pumpkin Spice Moonshine	2011 San Francisco World Spirits Competition	Bronze Medal
Wry Moon (discontinued)	2010 American Distilling Institute Awards	Silver Medal
Wry Moon (discontinued)	2010 San Francisco World Spirits Competition	Double Gold
Oatmeal Stout (discontinued)	2011 American Distilling Institute Awards	Bronze Medal
Oatmeal Stout (discontinued)	2012 American Distilling Institute Awards	Silver Medal
Oak Smoked Wheat Whiskey (discontinued)	2012 American Distilling Institute Awards	Silver Medal
Triticale Whiskey (discontinued)	2012 American Distilling Institute Awards	Bronze Medal
Cherrywood Smoke (discontinued)	2012 American Distilling Institute Awards	Bronze Medal
100% Rye (discontinued)	2012 American Distilling Institute Awards	Silver Medal
100% Rye (discontinued)	2011 MicroLiquor Spirits Awards	Gold Medal
100% Rye (discontinued)	2011 American Distilling Institute Awards	Silver Medal
100% Rye (discontinued)	2010 American Distilling Institute Awards	Bronze Medal
100% Rye (discontinued)	2010 International Review of Spirits Awards, BTI	Silver Medal
Elderflower Bohemian (discontinued)	2012 American Distilling Institute Awards	Bronze Medal
Hopmonster (discontinued)	2012 NY International Spirits Competition Awards	Silver Medal
Steampunk (discontinued)	2013 American Distilling Institute Awards	Bronze Medal
