= Santera Tequila =

Brand of tequila

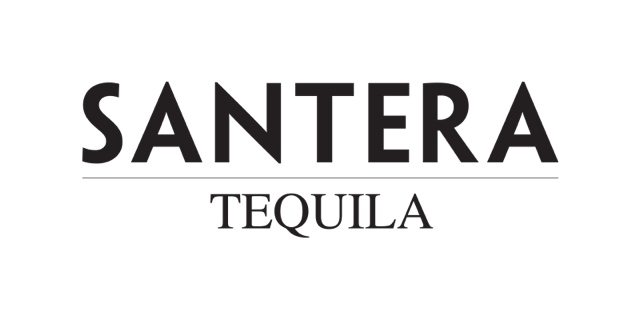
- Type: Tequila
- Manufacturer: Destiladora del Valle de Tequila Casa Maestri
- Distributor: MHW
- Origin: Mexico
- Introduced: 2015
- Alcohol by volume: 40% abv
- Proof (US): 80
- Related products: List of tequilas
- Website: santeratequila.com

Santera Tequila is a brand of tequila made from blue agave which is produced and bottled in Jalisco, Mexico.

The agave for Santera Tequila is grown in the volcanic soil of the dormant Volcán de Tequila. It is created by distiller Sebastian Melendrez. The tequila is made with highland agave containing 21 degrees brix (sugar content) and the pinas are roasted for up to 54 hours in hornos (brick ovens).

After distillation, Santera Tequila undergoes a proprietary filtration process for each interpretation. The Blanco is unaged, the Reposado is aged for seven months, and the Añejo is aged for sixteen months in American oak barrels. All three tequilas are kosher-certified.

== History ==
Santera Spirits, LLC. was founded in 2012.

== Varieties ==
Name	ABV (US)	Notes
Santera Blanco	40%	100% blue agave, unaged
Santera Reposado	40%	100% blue agave, aged in American Oak barrels up to seven months
Santera Añejo	40%	100% blue agave, aged up to 16 months in American Oak barrels and then blended with a locally sourced añejo

== Packaging ==
Santera Tequila bottles have a rectangular shape made of white flint glass and a cork top stopper.

== Awards ==
Expression	Year	Result
Santera Blanco	2016	Gold Medal, San Francisco Spirits Competition 89 points, Ultimate Spirits Challenge
Santera Reposado	2016	Finalist, 93 points, Ultimate Spirits Challenge Silver Medal, San Francisco Spirits Competition
Santera Añejo	2016	Finalist, 94 points, Ultimate Spirits Challenge Silver Medal, San Francisco Spirits Competition
