= Boodles British Gin =

Brand of British gin

- Type: Gin
- Manufacturer: Cock Russell & Co.
- Distributor: Proximo Spirits
- Origin: England
- Introduced: 1845
- Alcohol by volume: 40% (UK) and 45.2% (US)
- Proof (US): 80 (UK) and 90.4 (US)
- Variants: Original London Dry Gin + Strawberry & Rhubarb Gin
- Website: boodlesgin.com

Boodles British Gin is manufactured by Cock Russell and Company. It is distributed in the United Kingdom by Proximo Spirits.

== History ==
Boodles was named after Boodle's gentlemen's club in St. James's, London, founded in 1762 and originally run by Edward Boodle. It was reputed to be the favourite gin of the club's most famous member, Winston Churchill, though the same has been claimed for Plymouth Gin.

Boodles was created in 1845, becoming one of the gins to shape the flavor of the modern London Dry style of gin, which is essentially a vodka-like spirit infused or otherwise flavored with a blend of botanical herbs and spices. It was originally produced by Cock Russell & Company, and was first bottled in the United States by Seagram's. In 2001, Seagram's assets were sold to several companies, including Pernod Ricard, which took over Boodles. In 2012, Boodles was purchased by Proximo Spirits of New Jersey.

In October 2013, Boodles Gin was released in the UK, with a redesigned bottle and an alcoholic strength of 80 proof. The botanical recipe for the gin remains the same. Boodles has always been made in the UK, but had previously only been available for purchase in the US and Japan.

== Description ==
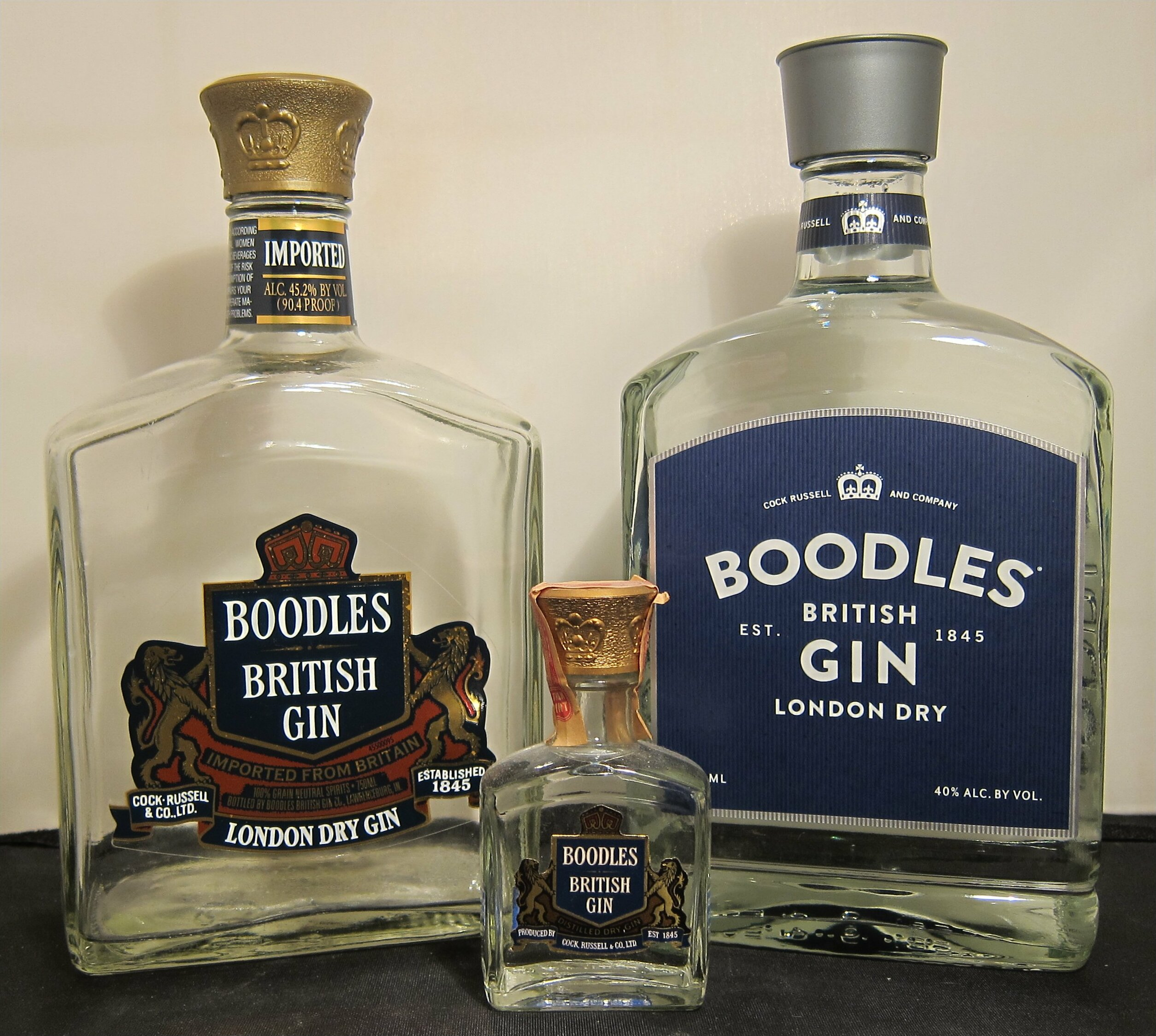
Three bottles of Boodles Gin (current bottle far right).

Boodles is bottled at two strengths: 45.2% alcohol by volume (90.4 proof) for the US, and 40% alcohol by volume (80 proof) for the UK market. It is produced at the Greenall's Distillery in Warrington, England, in a Carter-Head still.

The beverage contains a blend of nine botanicals: juniper, coriander seed, angelica root, angelica seed, cassia bark, caraway seed, nutmeg, rosemary and sage. It is made in a vacuum still, a process that allows the gin to retain more of the flavors of its botanicals. Unlike other London Dry gins, Boodles contains no citrus ingredients.

As of 2026, Boodles offers two products worldwide: Boodles Original London Dry Gin (ABV 45.2% or 90.4-proof) and Boodles Strawberry & Rhubarb Gin (ABV 35% or 70-proof).

== Honours ==
Wine Enthusiast magazine gave Boodles a score of 90–95 in 2004. It received a rating of 93 (Exceptional) from the Beverage Tasting Institute in 2013.
