= Cruz Tequila =

Brand of tequila produced by Los Diablos International, Inc

CRUZ del Sol Tequila is a brand of tequila produced in the highlands of Jalisco, Mexico by Los Diablos International, Inc. The company currently offers two varieties of tequila, a blanco and a reposado.

== History ==
Cruz Tequila was founded in May 2005 by partners and Arizona State University alumni Joseph and Saulo Katcher and Todd Nelson, and is headquartered in Scottsdale, Arizona. Cruz Tequila has since won numerous international spirit awards and is currently distributed in North America by Trinchero Family Estates and their partners in dozens of states and nationwide by online retailers.

== Awards ==
Gold Medal, Reposado Tequila
2009 San Francisco International Spirits Competition

Silver Medal, Reposado Tequila
2008 San Francisco International Spirits Competition

Bronze Medal, Packaging Design
2008 San Francisco International Spirits Competition

Bronze Medal, Reposado Tequila
2008 Agave Spirits Competition
