= St. George Spirits =

Artisanal distillery from California founded in 1982

Coordinates: 37.7876°N 122.3093°W

St. George Spirits, Inc.
- Type: Private
- Founded: Jorg Rupf, (January 4, 1982)
- Headquarters: Alameda, California, USA
- Key people: Jorg Rupf, Lance Winters, Dave Smith
- Products: Vodka, gin, absinthe, liqueur, whiskey, brandy
- Website: St. George Spirits

St. George Spirits is an artisanal distillery located in Alameda, California that produces a range of alcoholic beverages under the direction of Master Distiller Lance Winters. They are known for producing vodka, absinthe, whiskey, gin, brandy, liqueurs, and a range of exotic spirits.

== History ==
St. George Spirits was founded in 1982 by Jorg Rupf as an eau de vie distillery. In 1996, Jorg Rupf hired Lance Winters, a brewer and former nuclear scientist. One year later, Jorg and Lance began distilling and aging their single malt whiskey, which was first released in 2000. In 2004, St. George Spirits moved into its current location, a 65,000-square-foot (6,000 m^{2}) airplane hangar on the former Alameda naval air station.

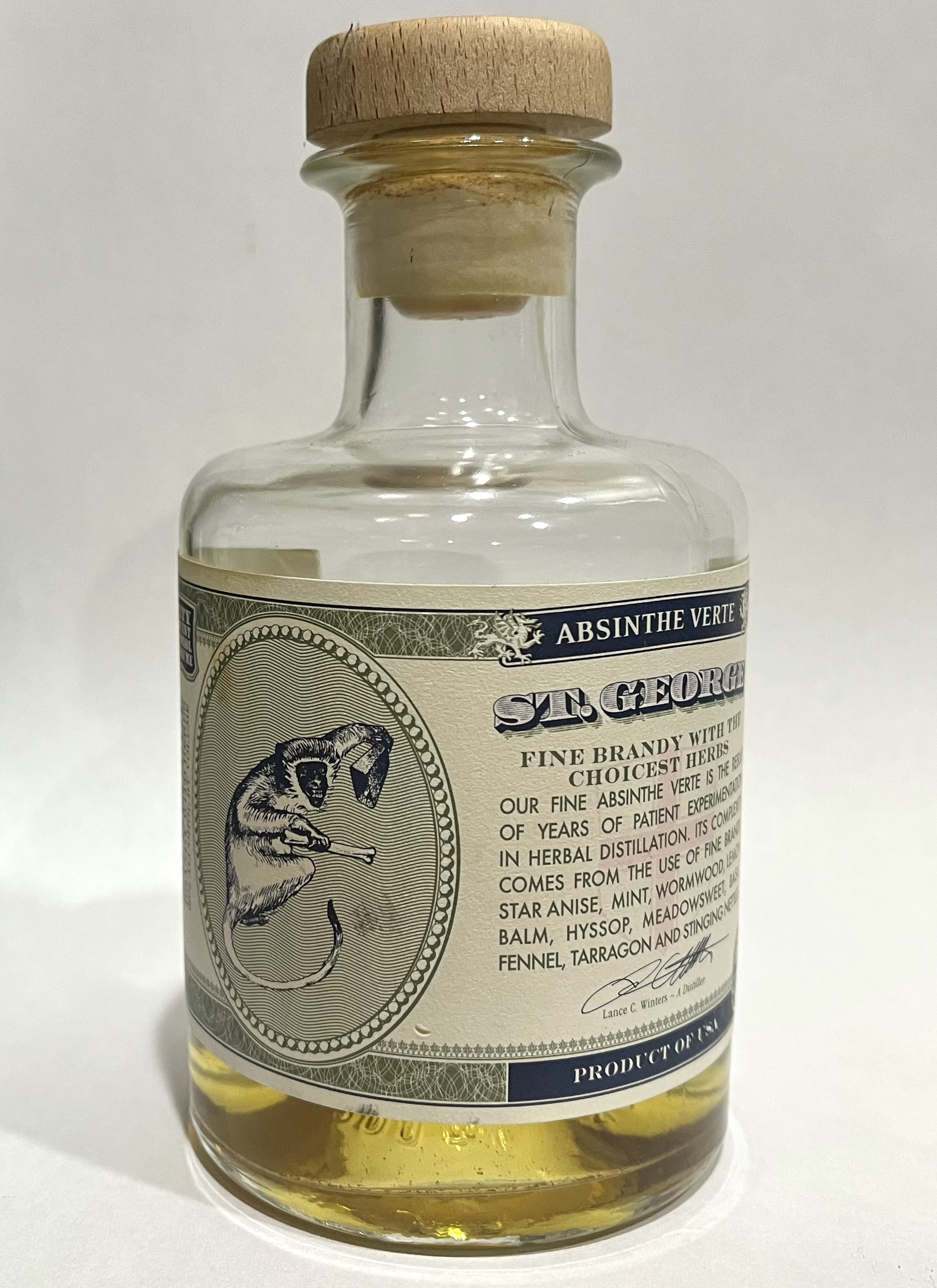
St. George Absinthe Verte

In December 2009, the company released the first commercially available American absinthe, St. George Absinthe Verte, since the lifting of the 1912 ban on making the spirit. The recipe had been in development for 11 years prior to release, as the ban only applied to the commercial sale of the spirit (not development).

Jorg Rupf retired as master distiller in 2010. That same year, St. George sold their popular Hangar One Vodka line to Proximo Spirits to focus on new projects, including: gin, liqueurs, malt whisky, agricole rum, and Breaking & Entering Whiskies. In 2015 they released a new line of three vodkas, and in 2016 they brought out Bruto Americano, a California Amaro.

In 2013, Maverick Drinks began distributing St. George Spirits in the UK. By 2018, St. George Spirits products were distributed in Canada, the UK, France, Germany, Italy, Austria, Switzerland, Belgium, Finland, China, Hong Kong, Australia, Singapore, Malaysia, Thailand, Bermuda, and Panama among others.

== Products ==
Current Spirits

Gins

- Terroir Gin (45% ABV)
- Botanivore Gin (45% ABV)
- Dry Rye Gin (45% ABV)
- Dry Rye Reposado Gin (49.5% ABV)

Whiskeys

- St. George Single Malt Whiskey (43% ABV)
- Breaking & Entering (B&E) American Whiskey (43% ABV)
- Baller Single Malt Whiskey (47% ABV)

Vodkas

- St. George All Purpose Vodka (40% ABV)
- St. George California Citrus Vodka (40% ABV)
- St. George Green Chile Vodka (40% ABV)

Other liqueurs

- Absinthe Verte (60% ABV)
- Fruit Brandies; Pear, Raspberry, (Both 40% ABV) and Reserve Apple (43% ABV)
- Fruit Liqueurs; Raspberry and Spiced Pear (Both 20% ABV)
- NOLA Coffee Liqueur (25% ABV)
- Bruto Americano (Italian Style Amaro, 24% ABV)
- St George California Shochu (Japanese Style Whiskey, 40% ABV)
- Aqua Perfecta Basil Eau De Vie (40% ABV)

Discontinued spirits

- Hangar One Vodka, now made solely by Proximo Spirits since 2014
- Agua Azul Agave Spirits
- Other experimental spirits known as "Flights of Fancy"
