= 4 Copas =

Organic Tequila

- Type: Tequila
- Manufacturer: Tequila Las Americas, S.A. De C.V.
- Origin: Mexico
- Alcohol by volume: 40%
- Proof (US): 80
- Website: 4 Copas

4 Copas is an organic Tequila distilled by Hacienda de Oro, located in Amatitan, Jalisco, Mexico which uses sustainable organic methods. The company also participates in the supporting of Sea Turtle Restoration Project an organization dedicated to research and support of conservation of Sea Turtles.

== Products ==
- 4 Copas Blanco
- 4 Copas Reposado
- 4 Copas Añejo
- 4 Copas Extra Añejo
- 4 Copas Limited Edition (minimum 3 years aging)
- 4 Copas Sea Turtles Limited (proceeds benefit Sea Turtle Restoration Project)
- 4 Copas Organic Nectar (raw Agave Juice)

== Awards ==
- 2006 Gold Reposado Tequila San Francisco World Spirits Competition
- 2006 Silver Blanco Tequila San Francisco World Spirits Competition
- 2006 Bronze Anejo Tequila San Francisco World Spirits Competition
