= Proximo Spirits =

American alcoholic beverages company

- Type: Subsidiary of public company Becle, S.A.B. de C.V.
- Industry: Distilled beverage
- Founded: 2007
- Founder: Beckmann family
- Headquarters: Jersey City, NJ, USA
- Area served: International
- Key people: Mauricio Vergara (president and CEO)
- Products: Jose Cuervo Tequilas; Bushmills Whiskeys; Stranahan's American Single Malts; 400 Conejos Mezcals; 1800 Tequilas; Dobel Tequilas; Cuervo Margaritas and 1800 Margaritas.
- Number of employees: 200+
- Subsidiaries: Proximo Spirits UK
- Website: proximospirits.com

Proximo Spirits, Inc., is an American multinational alcoholic beverage company, with its headquarters in Jersey City, New Jersey. It is a distributor of tequila and other spirits, it is best known for Jose Cuervo, the world's largest-selling tequila brand.

Proximo owns over a dozen spirits brands, including Jose Cuervo, 1800 Tequila, Three Olives Vodka, Kraken Black Spiced Rum and Boodles British Gin, as well as, craft spirits such as Hangar 1 Vodka, Great Jones Whiskey and Stranahan's Colorado Whiskey.

Sources indicated in early 2026, that Proximo distributes approximately 12.3 million nine-liter cases per year in the USA alone.

== History ==
Proximo Spirits was founded in 2007 by the Beckmann family, who also owns and operates Jose Cuervo. In a deal announced in March 2013, Proximo took over the Jose Cuervo distribution rights from Diageo on July 1, 2013. The deal also give Proximo Spirits control over Old Bushmills Distillery. London-based Proximo Spirits UK was launched in July 2013. Both Proximo and Cuervo are controlled by the Beckmann family, descendants of Jose María Guadalupe de Cuervo.

Proximo announced the release of TINCUP whiskey, a partnership with Stranahan's Colorado Whiskey founder Jess Graber, in 2014.

In 2021, Proximo bought a majority stake in Proper No. Twelve Irish whiskey, in a deal worth up to $600 million. Proximo acquired Spanish distribution firm Icon Spirits in October 2023, ending its joint venture with Maison Villevert. In 2025, Proximo announced that Mauricio Vegara would now manage the US and Canada region for the company. In 2026, Johnson Brothers expanded its partnership with Proximo Spirits for distribution in some US markets. Proximo Spirits is the world's leading tequila distributor."

== Brands Distributed by Proximo Spirits ==
=== Tequila ===
- Jose Cuervo (all varieties, 35-40% ABV). Includes silver, reposado, añejo, cristalino tequilas.
- 1800 Tequila (all varieties, 35-45% ABV). Includes silver, reposado, añejo, cristalino tequilas + flavored tequilas.
- Gran Centenario (small batch 100% blue agave tequila, 40% ABV). Includes plata, reposado, añejo, extra-añejo, cristalino tequilas.
- Maestro Dobel Tequila (all varieties, 40% ABV). Includes silver, reposado, añejo, extra-añejo, pechuga, cristalino tequilas.
- Reserva de la Familia (all varieties, 40% ABV). Includes platino, reposado, extra-añejo, cristalino tequilas.
- Gran Coramino Tequila (all varieties, 40% ABV). Includes cristalino, reposado, añejo tequilas.
- JAJA Tequila (all varieties, 40% ABV). Includes silver, reposado, añejo tequilas
- Devil's Reserve Tequila (40% ABV). Flavored Tequila with spicy notes
  - ABV means Alcohol by Volume*

Mezcal

- 400 Conejos Mezcal (all varieties, 40% ABV). Includes joven, reposado, añejo, Cuishe,Tobalá mezcals.
- Creyente Mezcal (all varieties, 40% ABV). Includes cristalino, Espadín, Cuishe,Tobalá mezcals.

=== Vodka ===
- Three Olives Vodka (available unflavored and in a range of flavors, 30-40% ABV).
- Hangar 1 Vodka (grape-based, fruit-infused vodka from California, 40% ABV).

=== Rum ===
- Kraken Black Spiced Rum (Caribbean rum, 35-47% ABV). Includes black spiced and gold spiced rums.
- Ron Matusalem Rum (Originally Cuban rum, now produced in the Dominican Republic using the Solera aging process, 40% ABV)

=== Whiskey ===
==== American Whiskey ====
- Black Dirt Distillery, Pine Island, New York (Applejack brandy 50% ABV)
- Stranahan's Colorado Whiskey (the first legal whiskey distilled in Colorado, 42-60% ABV). Includes American single malt whiskeys, as well as, cask strength whiskeys
- TINCUP American Whiskey (40-45% ABV). Includes bourbon, American, rye whiskeys.
- Great Jones Whiskey (1st Whiskey Distillery in Manhattan since Prohibition. 43-45% ABV). Includes bourbon and rye whiskeys

==== Canadian Whisky ====
- Pendleton Canadian Whisky at a range of ABVs. Includes Original, 1910 Bourbon, 1910 Rye, Midnight, Directors' Reserve

==== Irish Whiskey ====
- Bushmills Irish Whiskey (40-46% abv) Includes blended whiskeys and Single Malts
- Proper No. Twelve Irish whiskey (35-40% abv) Includes Original, Irish Apple, Black Reserve

=== Gin ===
- Boodles British Gin (London dry gin, 45.2% ABV) Includes Original + Strawberry & Rhubarb gins.

=== Liqueur ===
- Agavero (tequila liqueur made with 100% blue agave blended with various flavors, 32% ABV). Includes Original and Orange liqueurs.

=== Margaritas ===
- Jose Cuervo Margaritas in bottles and cans (Authentic Margaritas 9.95% ABV; Golden Margaritas 12.7% ABV; Sparkling Margaritas in cans 5.9% ABV (new) & 8% ABV (old).
- 1800 The Ultimate Margaritas in bottles 9.95% ABV
- Jose Cuervo margarita mixes (all varieties, 0% ABV)

== Marketing ==
Proximo signed marketing agreements with the Los Angeles Lakers in 2009 and the New York Knicks in 2010, to promote 1800 Tequila at their respective stadiums. Proximo's ad campaigns have featured actor Kiefer Sutherland for Jose Cuervo; actor Ray Liotta, actor Michael Imperioli and rapper Rick Ross for 1800 Tequila; and actor Clive Owen and rapper Lil' Kim for Three Olives Vodka.

In 2025, according to HS&E, Proximo Spirits holds 50+ sports partnerships throughout its portfolio of brands including NBA, NFL, NHL, MLB, PGA Tour, Tennis and Futbol properties. NASCAR was also a new partnership formed with the Cuervo brand.
