= Bryan Davis (inventor) =

American inventor and distiller

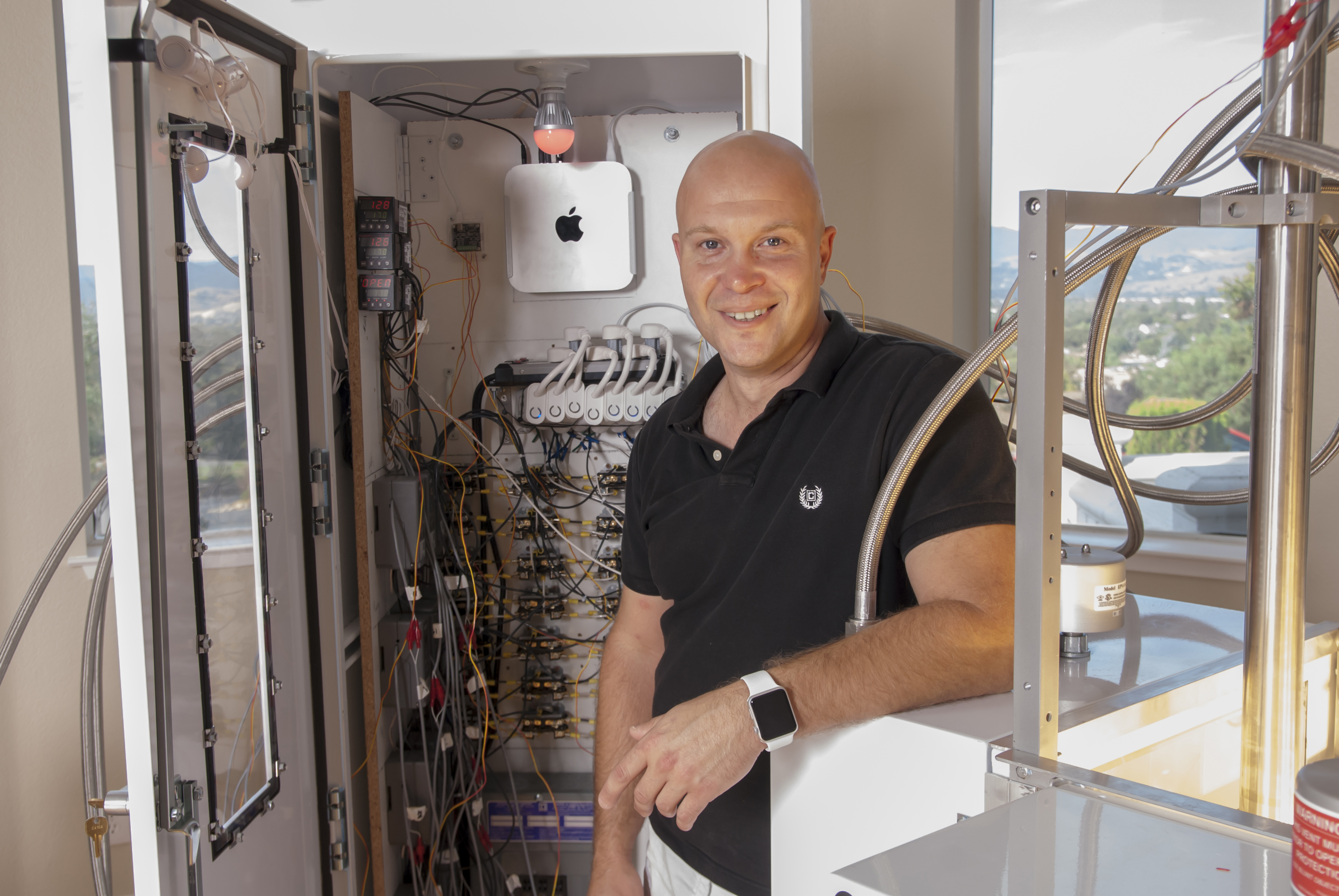
- Bryan Davis posing with an early Lost Spirits aging reactor.
- Born: April 13, 1981 (age 45); Monterey, California
- Education: San Francisco Art Institute
- Occupations: Founder and CEO of Lost Spirits
- Known for: Inventing the Davis method of aging spirits

Bryan Davis (born 1981 in Monterey, California) is an American inventor and distiller. He is most noteworthy for inventing and patenting the first process documented to successfully replicate some of the effects of barrel ageing of distilled spirits in a laboratory (the Davis method). He is the founder of Lost Spirits an award-winning distilled spirits manufacturing company which uses the technology to manufacture its products as well as license the technology to third parties.

In 2015, The Spirits Business presented Davis with the Global Master award for innovation.

As of 2016, the Davis method of aging spirits is only used by a handful of producers. However, it has been widely speculated that Davis' invention may ultimately revolutionize the spirits industry. Products made using Davis' technology have been named the "best spirits of 2015" by Serious Eats, and "best spirits of 2014" by liquor.com. Rum made using the technology won "best in class" at the Miami Rum Renaissance blind judging in 2014. Additionally, his company, was nominated for Craft Distillery of the Year in 2014 by Whisky Magazine.

== Education ==
Davis obtained a Bachelor of fine Arts from The San Francisco Art Institute. With self-taught techniques acquired through the use of various online scientific resources, including pubmed, he created methods in organic chemistry used industrially.

== Career ==
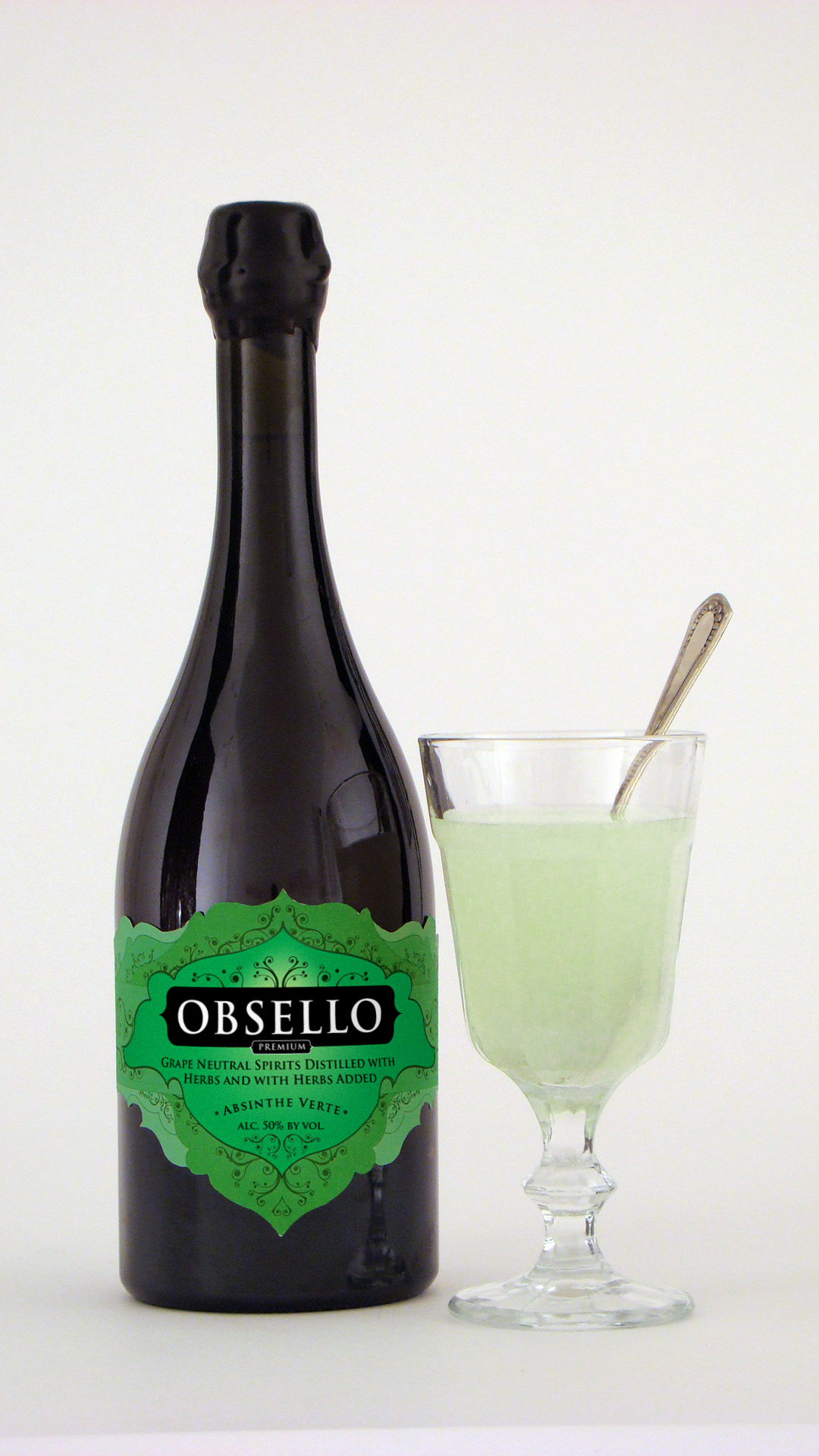
A bottle of Obsello

Davis in 2008

Davis was the co-founder and distiller of Obsello Absinthe, and Port of Dragons gin before founding Lost Spirits in 2010. Obsello Absinthe Verte was a brand of green absinthe distilled in California, US, from eight herbs including absinthe wormwood.

In 2021 Lost Spirits Distillery relocated to Las Vegas as added a circus show to the distillery. The Lost Spirits Distillery Circus show was structured as an Immersive theater, which was considered highly innovative at the time, it ran for over 1000 shows and sold hundreds of thousands of tickets making it one of the most successful examples of immersive theatre to date.

In 2024 Davis moved to Cortez, Colorado and opened a small theatrical Chocolate Shop called The Dotty Wampus Magical Chocolate Factory.
