= 1519 Tequila =

Organic Tequila

1519
- Type: Tequila
- Manufacturer: AGAVE CONQUISTA
- Distributor: A. Hardy USA
- Country of origin: Mexico
- Alcohol by volume: 40% abv
- Proof (US): 80
- Website: www.agaveconquista.com

Tequila 1519 (NOM: 1577, DOT: 295) is a Certified Organic Tequila by both USDA and European Union that also certified Kosher Pareve by Orthodox Union.

== Background ==
According to the official company page the Brand's name come from the year 1519 when conquistadors like Hernán Cortés were introduced to the Aztec's sacred ceremonial drink known as Aguamiel, though this explanation is disputed in other sources.

== Products ==
- "1519" Blanco
- "1519" Reposado
- "1519" Anejo
