= Lost Spirits =

Distillery and circus show in Nevada, US

Coordinates: 36.13028°N 115.18257°W

- Location: Las Vegas, Nevada (2021-2024); Los Angeles, California (2016-2018); Salinas, California (2010-2016)
- Founded: 2010
- Founder: Bryan Davis; Joanna Haruta
- Status: Closed
- Website: www.lostspirits.net

Lost Spirits was an innovative distillery using high tech distilling methods to create spirits neatly identical to aged ones. It also had immersive circus show located in Las Vegas, Nevada. It was founded by Bryan Davis and Joanne Haruta. The distillery was initially located in Salinas, California, where it opened in 2010.

Lost Spirits closed at the end of April 2024. At the time of the closing Lost Spirits had hosted over 250,000 guests in its Las Vegas location and was generating an estimated $12.9 Million in Annual Revenue.

== History ==
In 2015, the distillery attracted attention after Davis developed technology to create mature whisky and rum within days. In 2016, the distillery was moved to downtown Los Angeles, California.

Davis's process was shown, using modern analytical chemistry, to replicate the chemical reactions that take place as spirits age in barrels. The process aims to replicate the aging process in a laboratory while producing the same chemical signature and taste.

In 2021, Davis and Haruta moved the distillery to Las Vegas. The new location included a tour described as "an adult Disneyland". The Las Vegas version featured a large cast of live actors, acrobats, contortionists and singers.

Eventually, commercialisation proved difficult. Partially because "real aged" played a central role is the value of such spirits. The entertainment activities in Las Vegas were then damaged by COVID closures, from which the company never recovered fully.

== Reception and awards ==
Whisky made using Davis' process performed favorably in blind tastings hosted by Whisky Advocate, and won a Liquid Gold award in Jim Murray's 2018 Whisky Bible. The distillery won The Spirits Business magazine's Global Prize for Innovation in 2015. Smithsonian Magazine described Lost Spirits as "cult hit among spirits geeks".

In 2023 Lost Spirits was listed on the annual Thrillist list of the best live shows and musicals in Las Vegas.
