= Stranahan's Colorado Whiskey =

Whiskey distilled in Denver, Colorado

- Type: Whiskey
- Manufacturer: Stranahan's Distillery
- Distributor: Proximo Spirits
- Origin: United States
- Introduced: 2004
- Alcohol by volume: 47%
- Proof (US): 94
- Related products: List of whisky brands
- Website: stranahans.com

Stranahan's Colorado Whiskey started its brewing business with a 94 proof, small batch whiskey distilled in Denver, Colorado. Stranahan's was the first modern microdistillery to legally make whiskey in Colorado, and an early craft whiskey distiller in the United States.

Stranahan's was at the forefront of pioneer efforts for the official establishment of the American Single Malt Category, which was enacted on January 19, 2025.

== History ==
Stranahan's was founded by Jess Graber and George Stranahan, after whom the whiskey is named, in Colorado in 2004. In 1998, Graber, a volunteer firefighter, met Stranahan, the founder and owner of Flying Dog Brewery, while fighting a fire at Stranahan's barn. They struck up a conversation about whiskey, and were soon in business together. One of the first craft whiskey distillers in the US, Stranahan's is said to have "kicked off the Colorado distilling craze" with its whiskey and the designation it invented, Rocky Mountain Whiskey. It was Colorado's first microdistillery, and the state's first legal distillery since Prohibition.

The first batch of Stranahan's Colorado Whiskey was distilled in 2004 and bottled in 2006. Stranahan's was sold to New Jersey–based Proximo Spirits in 2010, with operations remaining in Colorado. By 2012, Proximo had increased whiskey production from around 12 barrels per week to 30, with plans to grow into the high forties. Stranahan's was sold in 38 states and 7 countries until 2010, when Proximo decided to scale down sales to mostly the Colorado area, maintaining the whiskey's availability in its home state.

Until 2019, Rob Dietrich had served as Stranahan's head distiller, after taking over from the founding head distiller Jake Norris. Dietrich was followed by Owen Martin, who in late 2022 took a position with Angel's Envy. Justin Aden took the reins as "Head Blender" for Stranahan's in 2023.

== Product and Production descriptions ==
=== Distillation and aging ===
Stranahan's is a straight whiskey, aged in new charred oak barrels, like bourbon, with the final whiskey a blend of six, seven, eight, and nine-year old whiskeys. It is distilled from a 100% malt barley base grain, with four barleys sourced from the Colorado area, and water sourced from the Eldorado spring outside Boulder. Stranahan's initially used wash from Flying Dog Brewery, before moving to a larger facility and making their own wash beginning in 2009.

=== Packaging ===
Each barrel is bottled by hand, with each label hand-signed by the distiller, often including a note about, for instance, the music listened to during the whiskey's production. The bottling process is done by volunteers, who receive a free tour and a bottle of Stranahan's for their efforts. Volunteers can sign up online on the Stranahan's website – a random lottery picks volunteers from this list for each bottling crew. Current estimates show the waiting list to be over 20,000 people. The bottle features a metal cap, inspired by the old barroom practice of covering bottles with tin cups when the corks dry out.

=== Products ===
As of 2026, the current product line-up of Stranahan's Whiskey is:

Product	ABV	Barrel used for Aging	Flavor
Stranahan's Original	47%	New American oak barrel with #3 char	Cinnamon-butter, vanilla, chocolate, warm caramel, spice, brown sugar
Stranahan's Blue Peak	43%	New American oak barrels. Solera-finished.	Butterscotch, brown sugar, baked apples, cayenne, oak
Stranahan's Mountain Angel 10-Year	45.1%	New American charred oak barrels	Tobacco, pepper, dark chocolate, molasses
Stranahan's Mountain Angel 12-Year	47.3%	Finished in port wine casks from Portugal.	Blueberry, compote, ginger lemon, raspberry, blackberry strudel.
Stranahan's Sherry Cask	45%	Virgin American white oak barrels. Finished in PX and Oloroso sherry barrels from Andalusia, Spain	Honey, Montmorency cherries, black currant, fig, nutty brine, walnut
Stranahan's Diamond Peak	45%	1. Bushmills Single Malt cask 2. Extra Añejo Tequila cask 3.Caribbean Rum cask	Bright tropical fruit, brown sugar
Stranahan's Single Barrel	varies	Varies	One-of-a-kind profile depending on barrels used
Stranahan's Private Cask	varies	Varies	Depends on cask used
Stranahan's Snowflake (distillery exclusive)	about 47%	Varies	Depends on cask used

== Television and film ==
Stranahan's was featured in "Whiskey", an episode of the History Channel's Modern Marvels that originally aired on March 17, 2008.
