= Boodles Boxing Ball =

Annual society ball in London, England

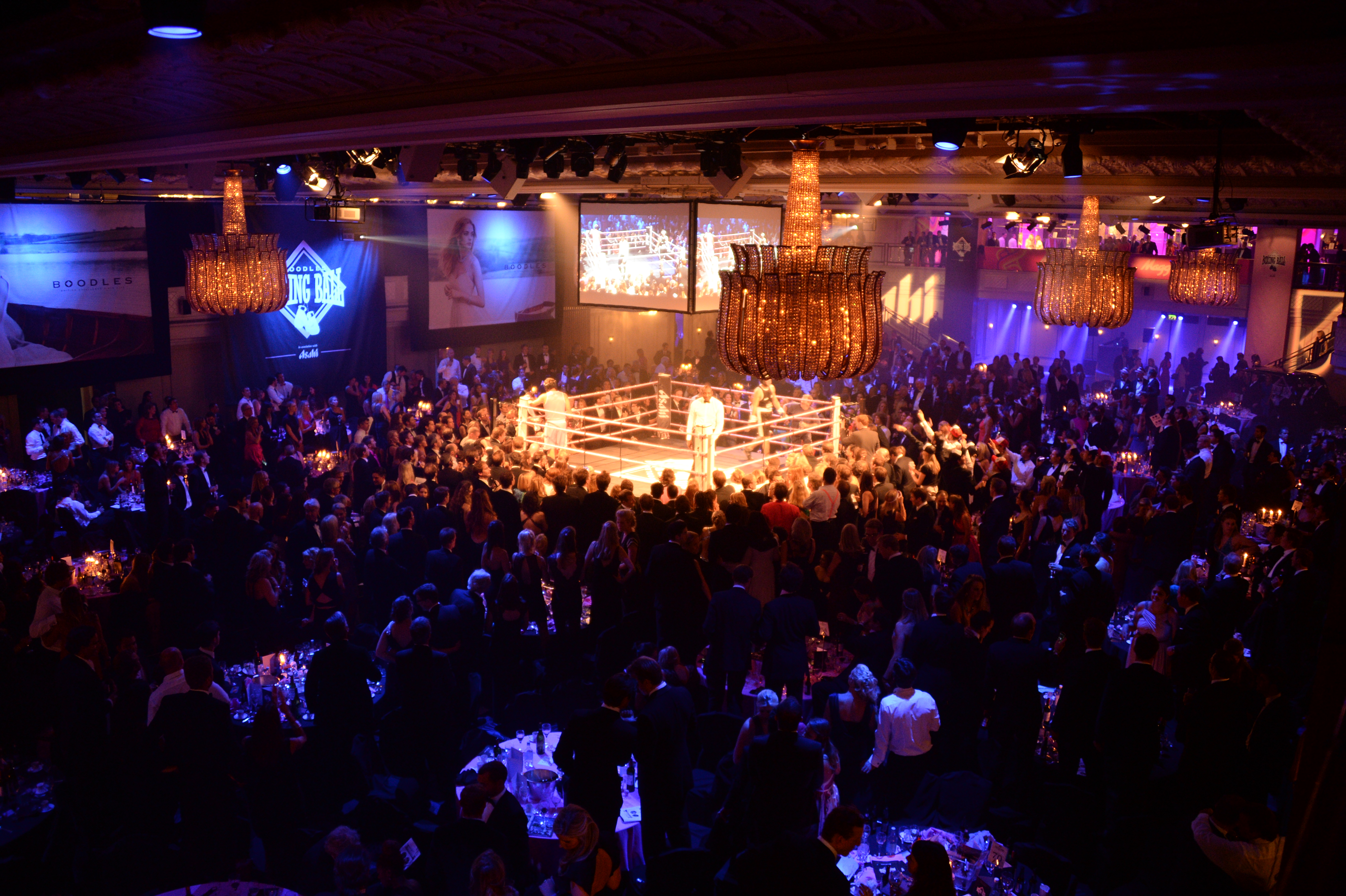
Boodles Boxing Ball 2013

The Boodles Boxing Ball is a white-collar boxing society ball held in London.

== Overview ==
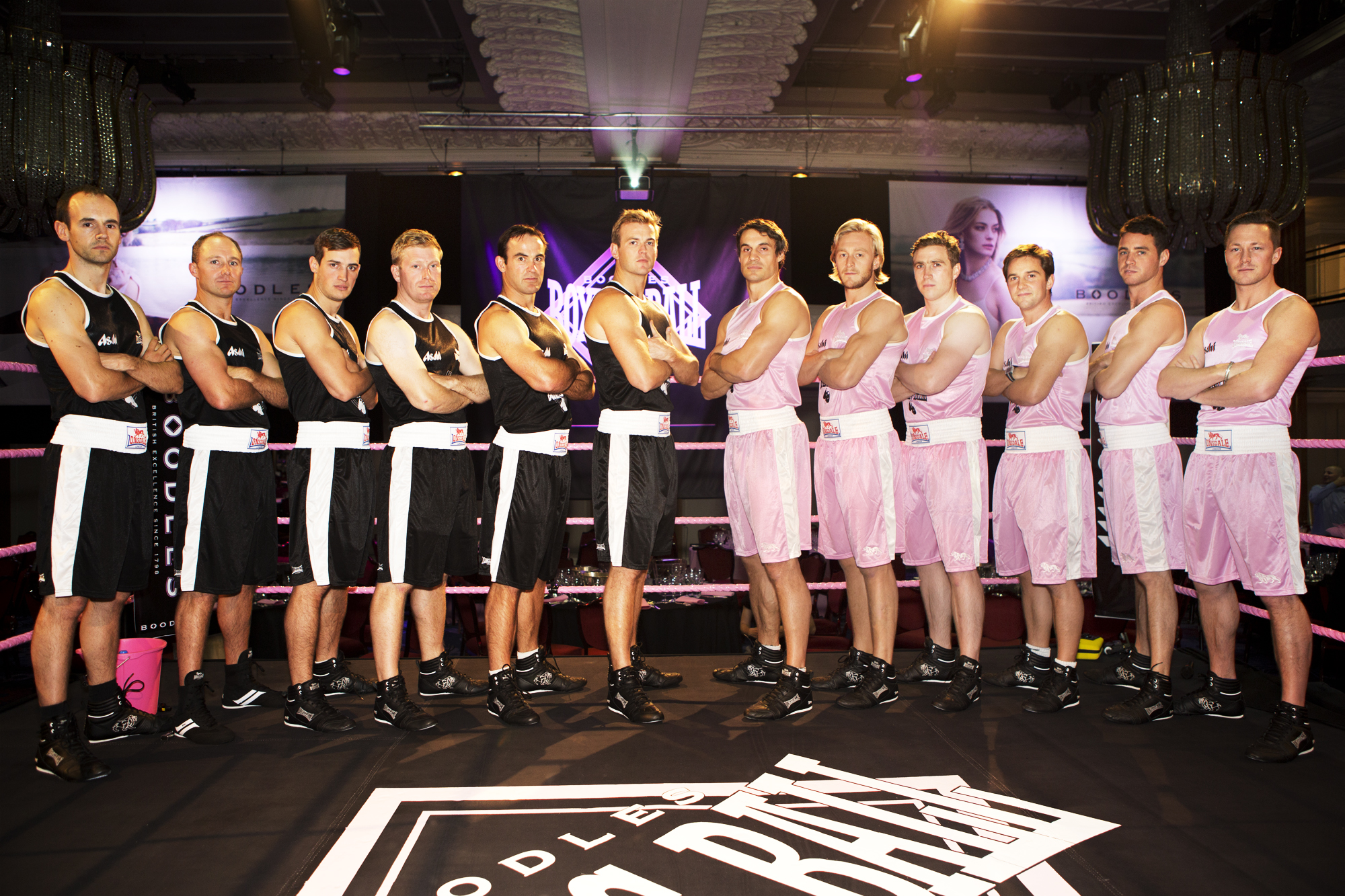
Boodles Boxers

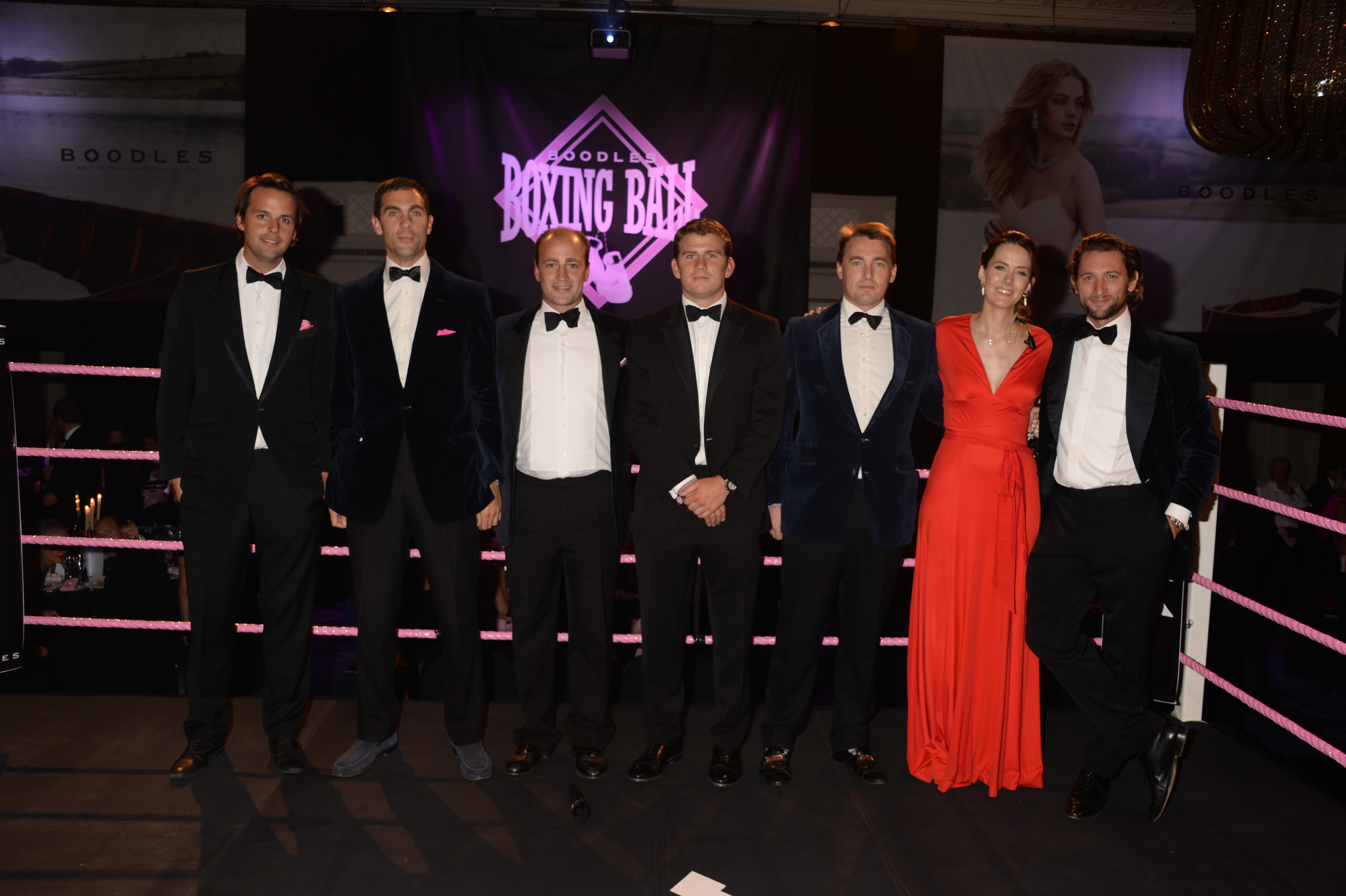
Boodles Boxing Ball Committee

The ball is organised by James Amos, director of Boodles, the nightclub owner Charlie Gilkes, Hugh Van Cutsem, Jez Lawson, Bear Maclean, Alice Beaumont and Alex Macewan.

== History ==
The first ball took place in 2002. The second and third events were held in 2006 and 2008 and both were attended by Prince William, Catherine Middleton and Prince Harry.

In 2012, the ball benefited the Starlight Children's Foundation and the Lt Dougie Dalzell MC Memorial Trust, which commemorates Dalzell's death in Afghanistan.

On 21 September 2013, the ball took place at the Grosvenor House Hotel on Park Lane. It was attended by Prince Harry, Pippa Middleton, Princesses Beatrice and Eugenie, Zara Tindall, Katherine Jenkins, Guy Ritchie, James Blunt, the entire Branson family and James Haskell. The ball raised £200,000 for the Starlight Children's Foundation.
