= Tequila Regulatory Council =

The Tequila Regulatory Council (Consejo Regulador del Tequila, CRT) is the Mexican government body in charge of safeguarding the appellation of origin of tequila.

== History ==
In 1949, the state of Jalisco published La Norma Oficial para la Calidad del Tequila which established the first official standards for producing tequila. In 1959, tequila producers created the Consejo Regulador del Tequila to control production and fight off fraudulent products.

In 1994, the Federal state made the Council a federal organ in charge of creating the appellation of origin of tequila worldwide, which was done the same year. At that point, the CRT admitted that probably half of the tequila sold worldwide was probably not agave-based tequila. Within its first two years of existence, the CRT destroyed 2.4 million liters of "fake" tequila. From 1991 to 1998, production of tequila doubled from 86 million to 156.4 million liters, and domestic consumption rose from 30% to 45% (of volumes produced), the result of the regulatory and promotional work of the CRT. The production of agave-based tequila rose from 5% to 30%. This production boost increased the availability/price of agave, forcing the Council to reconsider the percentage of pure agave liquor in tequila to maintain its market growth.

By 2010, it had shut down at least 86 brands of fake tequila. In 2017, the CRT asked the group Heineken to stop using the term "tequila" to describe the flavor of Desperados beers, or to actually use tequila in the composition of the product. This was interpreted as a move by tequila lobbyists to reserve the tequila label only to premium products. The same year, the CTR won the right in the USA to register tequila as a certification mark. In 2018, it contested Elon Musk's "Teslaquila" trademark, to which Musk tweeted back that he would "fight big Tequila". By 2025, as tequila exports were booming and access to agave was corrupted, the CRT launched an online platform for agave farmers to sell their crops directly to producers at a profitable rate.
